= List of municipalities in Toledo =

Map of Spain with the province of Toledo highlighted

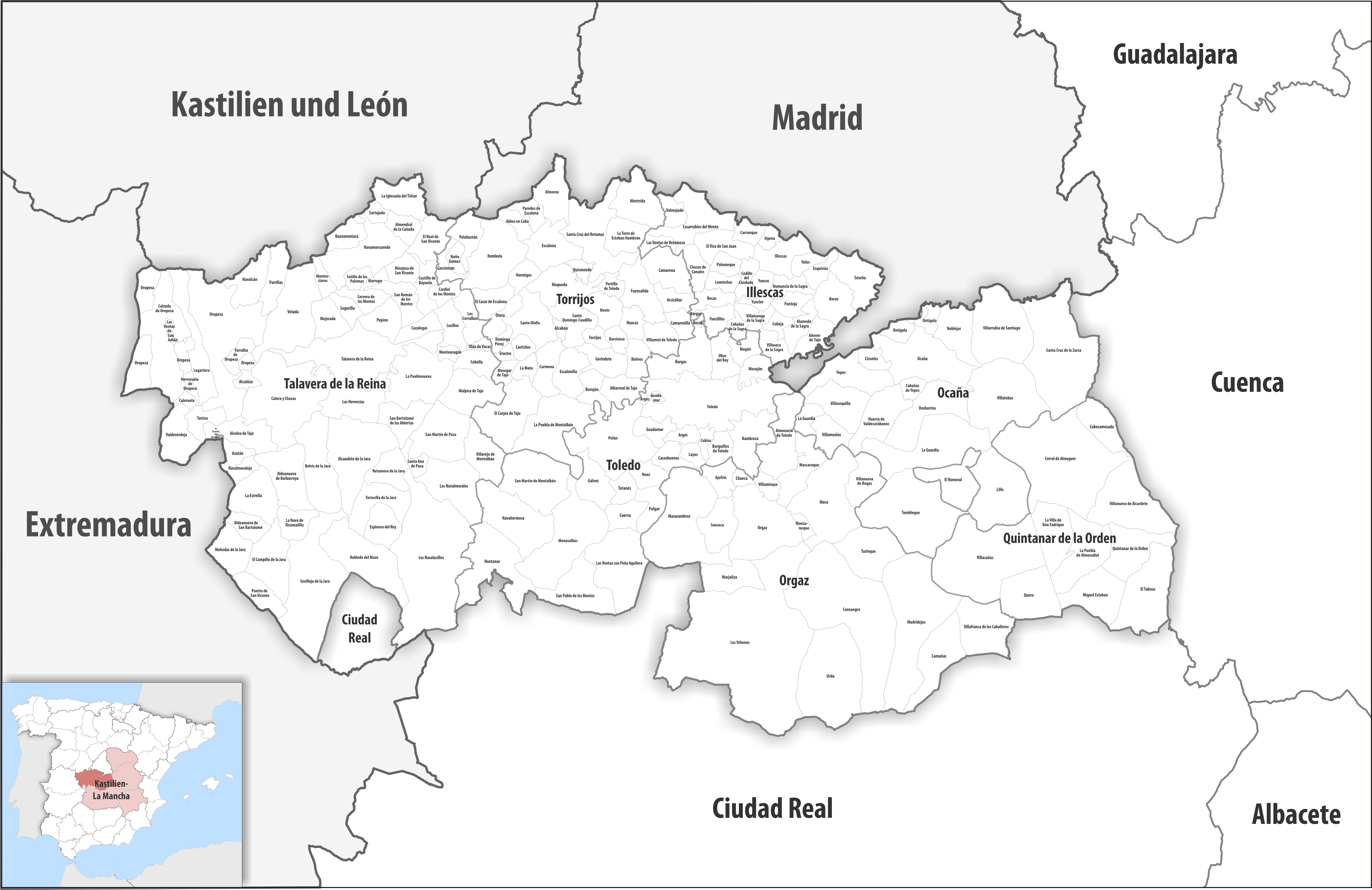
Map of the municipalities in the province of Toledo

Toledo is a province in the autonomous community of Castilla–La Mancha, Spain. The province is divided into 204 municipalities. As of the 2023 Spanish census, Toledo is the 23rd most populous of Spain's 50 provinces, with 731,112 inhabitants, and the 7th largest by land area, spanning 15,369 km^{2} (5,934 sq mi). Municipalities are the most basic local political division in Spain and can only belong to one province. They enjoy a large degree of autonomy in their local administration, being in charge of tasks such as urban planning, water supply, lighting, roads, local police, and firefighting.

The organisation of municipalities in Spain is outlined by the local government law Ley 7/1985, de 2 de abril, Reguladora de las Bases del Régimen Local (transl. Law 7/1985, of 2 April, Regulating the Bases of the Local Administration), which was passed by the Cortes Generales—Spain’s national parliament—on 2 April 1985 and finalised by royal decree on 18 April 1986. Municipalities in Toledo are also governed by the Statute of Autonomy of Castilla-La Mancha, which includes provisions concerning their relations with Castilla–La Mancha's autonomous government. All citizens of Spain are required to register in the municipality in which they reside. Each municipality is a corporation (Note: Within the context of local government in Spain, a corporation is a legal entity representing a municipality. Each municipality is empowered to govern over a specific piece of land and its population.) with independent legal personhood: its governing body is called the ayuntamiento (municipal council or corporation), a term often also used to refer to the municipal offices (city and town halls). The ayuntamiento is composed of the mayor (Spanish: alcalde), the deputy mayors (tenientes de alcalde) and the councillors (concejales), who form the plenary (pleno), the deliberative body. Municipalities are categorised by population for determining the number of councillors: three when the population is up to 100 inhabitants, five for 101–250, seven for 251–1,000, nine for 1,001–2,000, eleven for 2,001–5,000, thirteen for 5,001–10,000, seventeen for 10,001–20,000, twenty-one for 20,001–50,000, and twenty-five for 50,001–100,000. One councillor is added for every additional 100,000 inhabitants, with a further one included if the total would otherwise be even, to avoid tied votes.

The mayor and the deputy mayors are elected by the plenary assembly, which is itself elected by universal suffrage. Elections in municipalities with more than 250 inhabitants are carried out following a proportional representation system with closed lists, whilst those with a population lower than 250 use a block plurality voting system with open lists. The plenary assembly must meet periodically, with meetings occurring more or less frequently depending on the population of the municipality: monthly for those whose population is larger than 20,000, once every two months if it ranges between 5,001 and 20,000, and once every three months if it does not exceed 5,000. Many ayuntamientos also have a local governing board (Spanish: junta de gobierno local), which is appointed by the mayor from amongst the councillors and is required for municipalities of over 5,000 inhabitants. The board, whose role is to assist the mayor between meetings of the plenary assembly, may not include more than one third of the councillors.

The largest municipality by population in the province as of the 2023 Spanish census is Toledo, its capital, with 85,818 residents, while the smallest is Illán de Vacas, with 3 residents. The largest municipality by area is Los Yébenes, which spans 676.16 square kilometres (261.07 sq mi), while El Puente del Arzobispo is the smallest at 0.98 square kilometres (0.38 sq mi).

== Municipalities ==
Largest municipalities in the province of Toledo by population

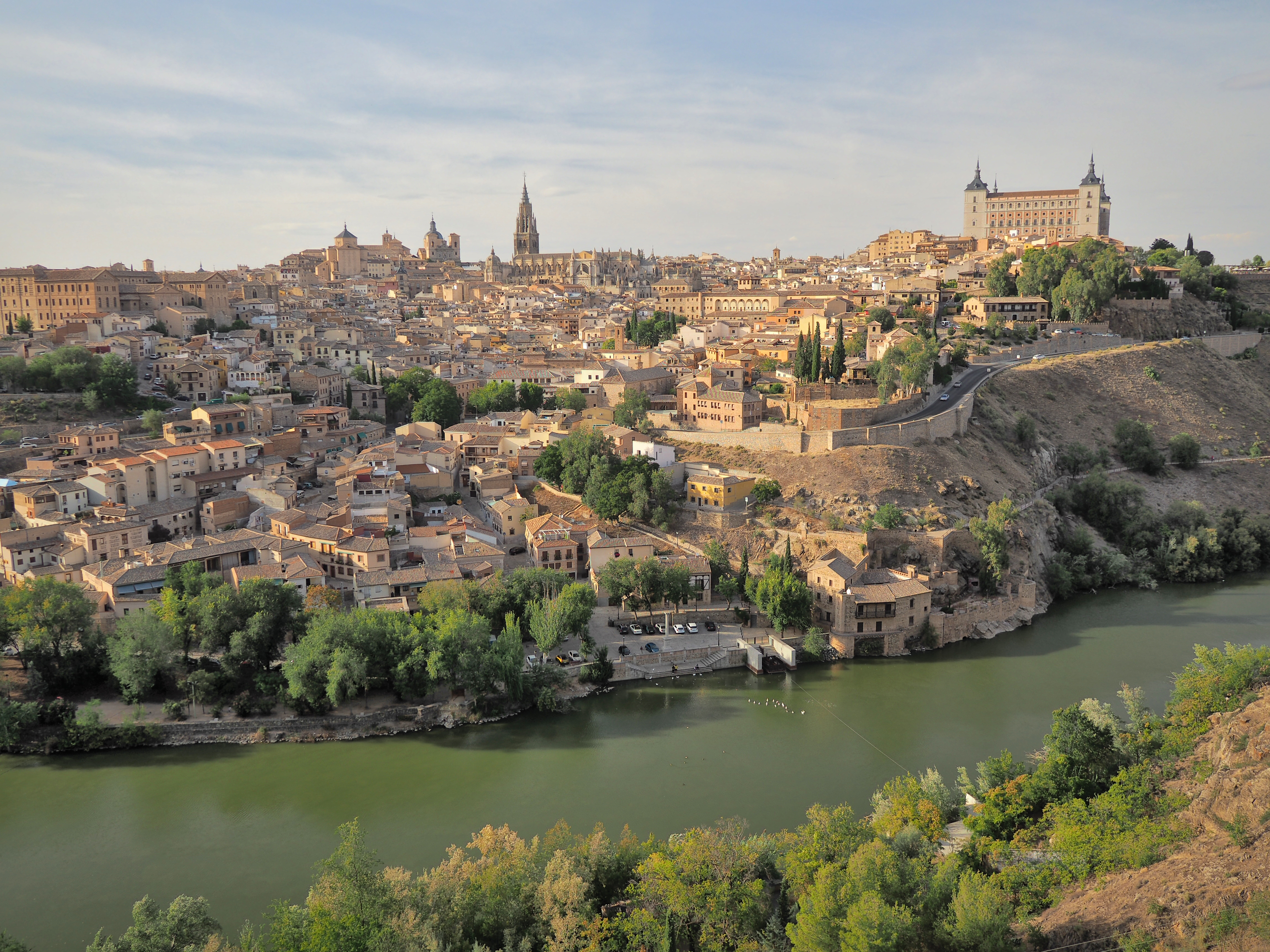
Toledo is the province's capital and largest municipality by population.

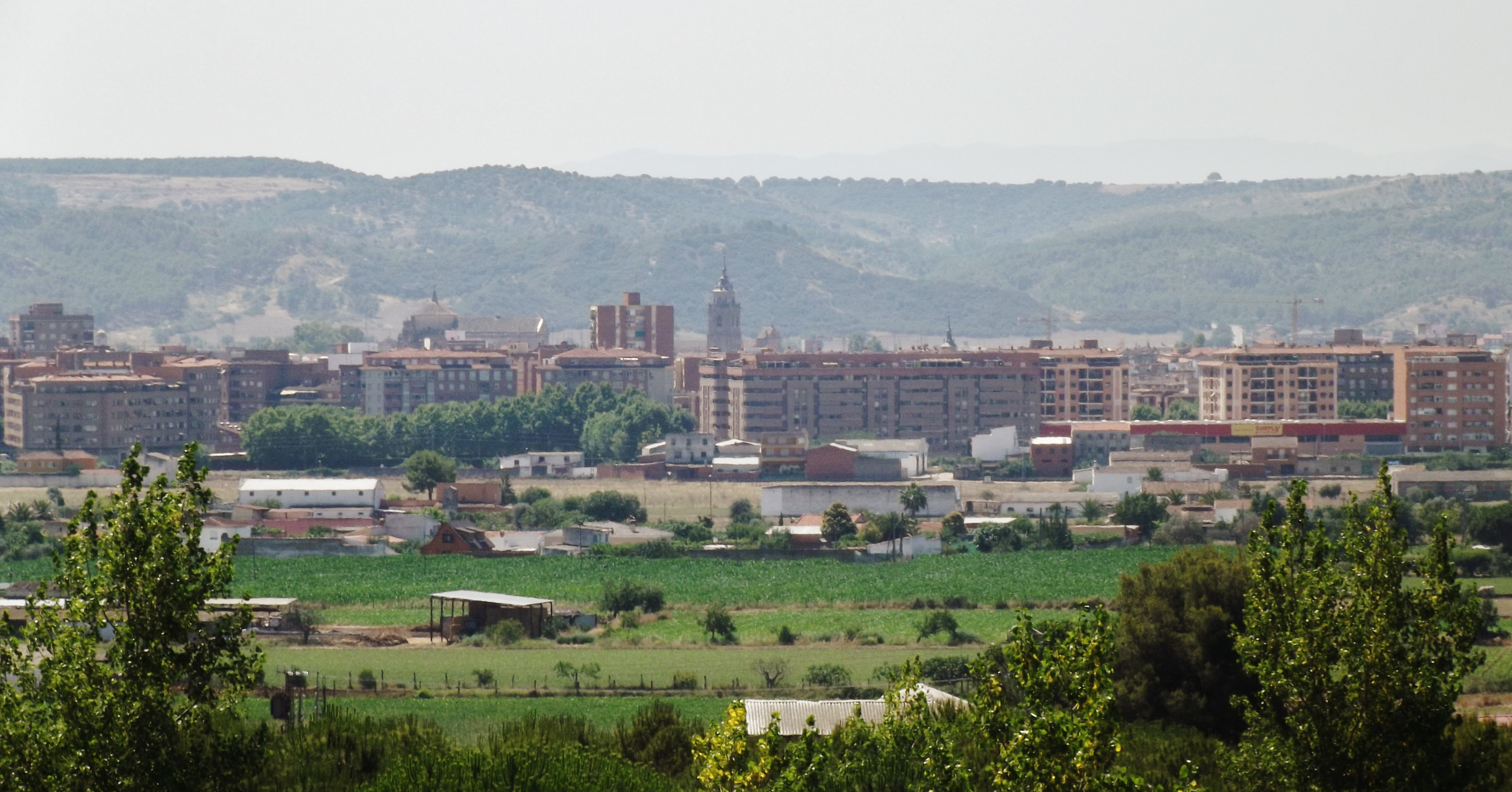
Talavera de la Reina, the second most populous municipality in the province of Toledo

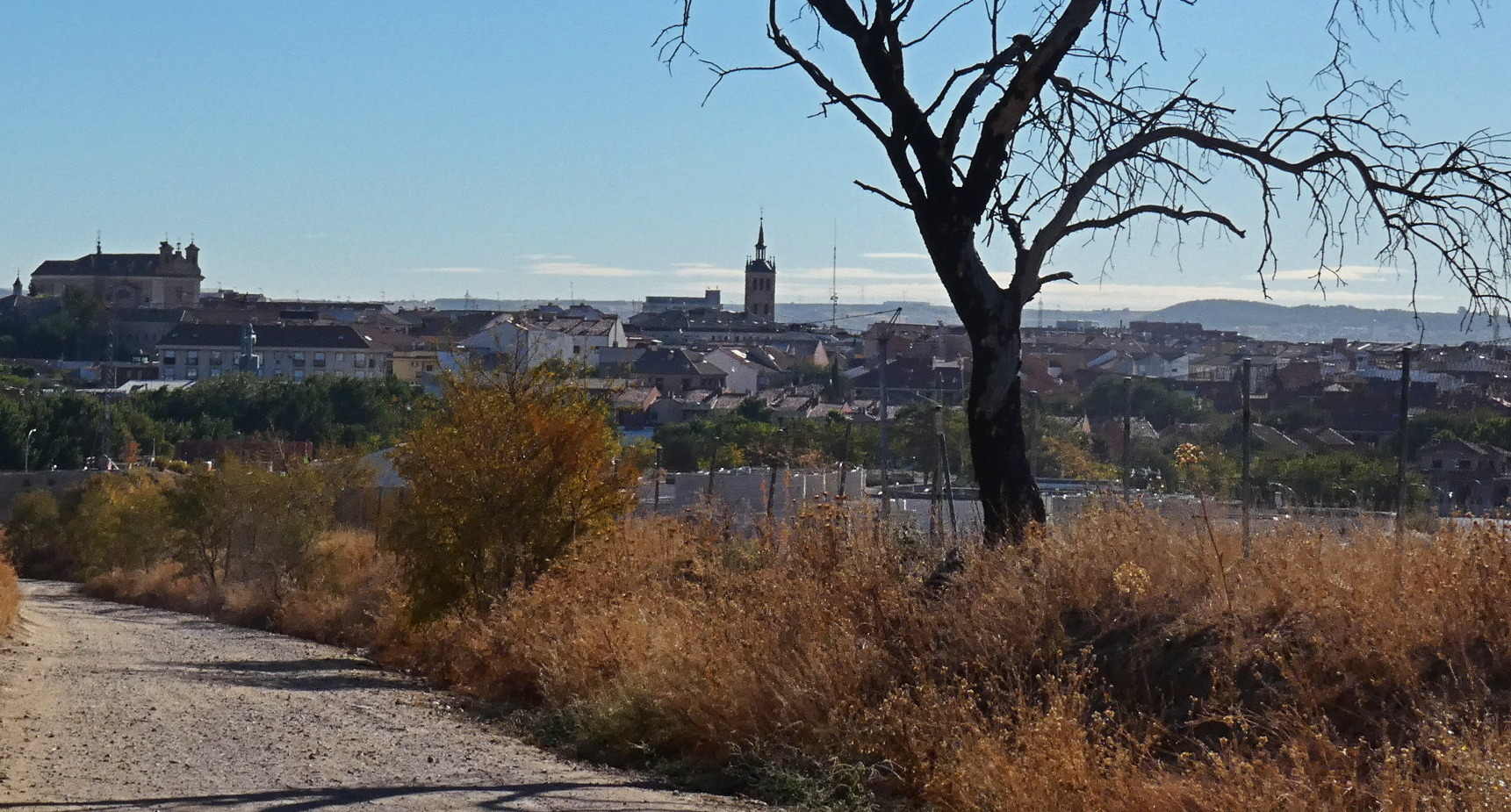
Illescas is the province of Toledo's third largest municipality by population.

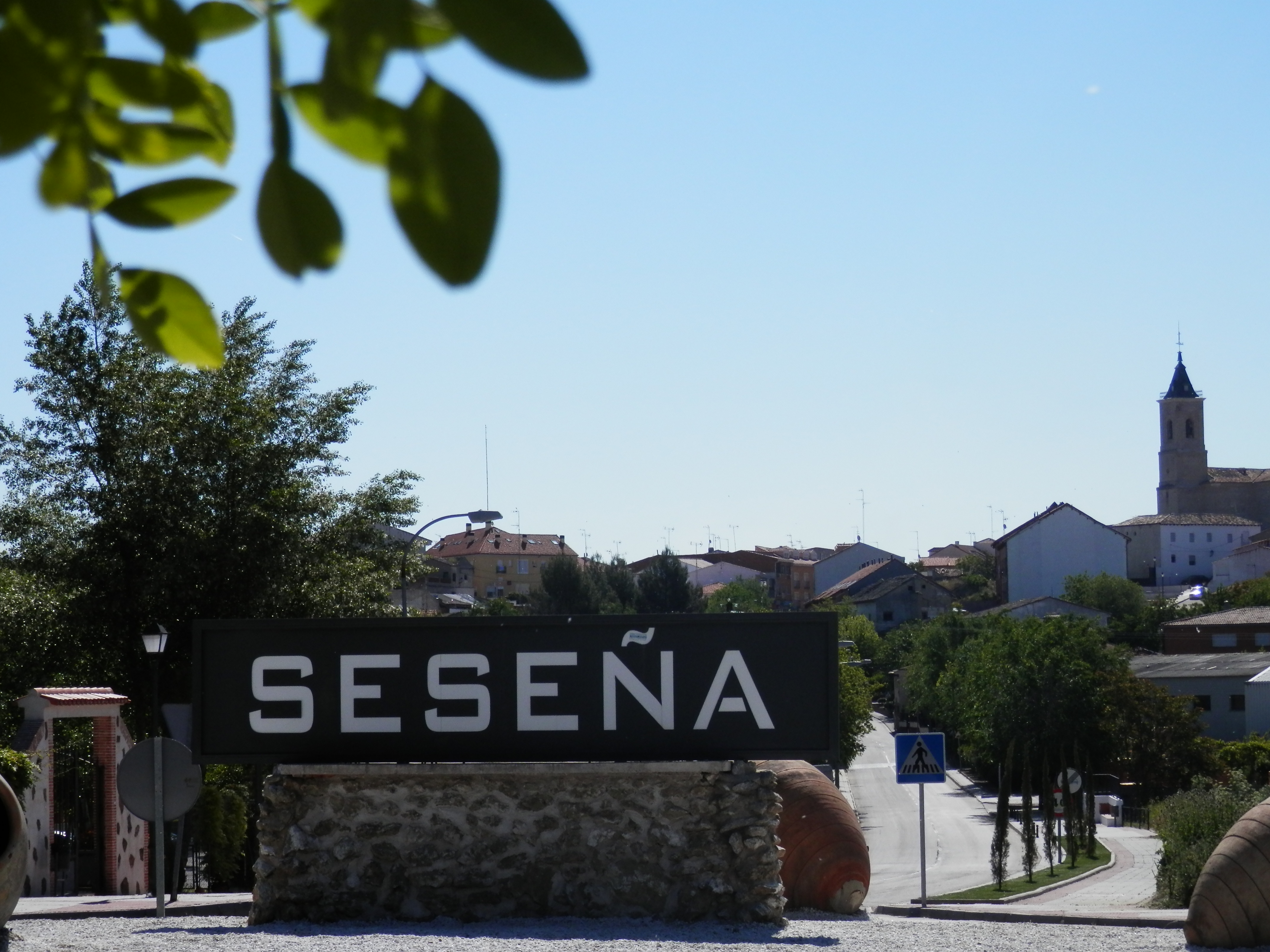
Seseña, the province of Toledo's fourth most populous municipality

† Provincial capital

Municipalities in the province of Toledo
Name	Population (2023 census)	Population (2011 census)	Population change	Land area (km^{2})	Population density (2023)
Ajofrín	2,346	2,345	0.0%	35.10	66.8/km^{2}
Alameda de la Sagra	4,158	3,511	+18.4%	32.99	126.0/km^{2}
Albarreal de Tajo	738	748	−1.3%	41.48	17.8/km^{2}
Alcabón	761	755	+0.8%	8.02	94.9/km^{2}
Alcañizo	282	314	−10.2%	13.51	20.9/km^{2}
Alcaudete de la Jara	1,652	2,031	−18.7%	156.12	10.6/km^{2}
Alcolea de Tajo	839	914	−8.2%	64.47	13.0/km^{2}
Aldea en Cabo	205	211	−2.8%	25.50	8.0/km^{2}
Aldeanueva de Barbarroya	456	649	−29.7%	91.80	5.0/km^{2}
Aldeanueva de San Bartolomé	412	508	−18.9%	34.61	11.9/km^{2}
Almendral de la Cañada	334	362	−7.7%	33.61	9.9/km^{2}
Almonacid de Toledo	927	874	+6.1%	95.58	9.7/km^{2}
Almorox	2,395	2,463	−2.8%	64.77	37.0/km^{2}
Añover de Tajo	5,236	5,400	−3.0%	40.25	130.1/km^{2}
Arcicóllar	1,072	807	+32.8%	30.55	35.1/km^{2}
Argés	6,978	5,655	+23.4%	24.00	290.8/km^{2}
Azután	292	298	−2.0%	21.61	13.5/km^{2}
Barcience	1,067	749	+42.5%	18.97	56.2/km^{2}
Bargas	11,018	9,751	+13.0%	89.76	122.7/km^{2}
Belvís de la Jara	1,489	1,777	−16.2%	114.02	13.1/km^{2}
Borox	4,172	3,510	+18.9%	60.05	69.5/km^{2}
Buenaventura	375	492	−23.8%	35.93	10.4/km^{2}
Burguillos de Toledo	3,652	2,796	+30.6%	28.43	128.5/km^{2}
Burujón	1,303	1,450	−10.1%	35.45	36.8/km^{2}
Cabañas de la Sagra	2,112	1,903	+11.0%	16.40	128.8/km^{2}
Cabañas de Yepes	295	318	−7.2%	17.97	16.4/km^{2}
Cabezamesada	374	477	−21.6%	59.83	6.3/km^{2}
Calera y Chozas	4,761	4,712	+1.0%	219.04	21.7/km^{2}
Caleruela	202	258	−21.7%	9.42	21.4/km^{2}
Calzada de Oropesa	499	558	−10.6%	142.17	3.5/km^{2}
Camarena	4,444	3,801	+16.9%	66.22	67.1/km^{2}
Camarenilla	628	602	+4.3%	24.31	25.8/km^{2}
El Campillo de la Jara	329	450	−26.9%	88.06	3.7/km^{2}
Camuñas	1,765	1,890	−6.6%	102.03	17.3/km^{2}
Cardiel de los Montes	399	383	+4.2%	24.31	16.4/km^{2}
Carmena	856	839	+2.0%	46.70	18.3/km^{2}
El Carpio de Tajo	1,863	2,153	−13.5%	113.58	16.4/km^{2}
Carranque	5,274	4,432	+19.0%	24.73	213.3/km^{2}
Carriches	276	293	−5.8%	18.67	14.8/km^{2}
El Casar de Escalona	2,032	2,162	−6.0%	39.55	51.4/km^{2}
Casarrubios del Monte	6,828	5,524	+23.6%	92.42	73.9/km^{2}
Casasbuenas	179	209	−14.4%	30.46	5.9/km^{2}
Castillo de Bayuela	919	988	−7.0%	37.32	24.6/km^{2}
Cazalegas	2,000	1,836	+8.9%	29.52	67.8/km^{2}
Cebolla	3,188	3,734	−14.6%	36.77	86.7/km^{2}
Cedillo del Condado	4,331	3,398	+27.5%	26.53	163.2/km^{2}
Los Cerralbos	436	460	−5.2%	40.15	10.9/km^{2}
Cervera de los Montes	503	475	+5.9%	31.69	15.9/km^{2}
Chozas de Canales	4,719	4,068	+16.0%	32.69	1.4/km^{2}
Chueca	252	271	−7.0%	11.12	22.7/km^{2}
Ciruelos	663	659	+0.6%	22.94	28.9/km^{2}
Cobeja	2,552	2,345	+8.8%	17.66	144.5/km^{2}
Cobisa	4,464	4,118	+8.4%	14.80	301.6/km^{2}
Consuegra	9,854	10,827	−9.0%	358.49	27.5/km^{2}
Corral de Almaguer	5,295	6,097	−13.2%	328.70	16.1/km^{2}
Cuerva	1,279	1,531	−16.5%	37.51	34.1/km^{2}
Domingo Pérez	410	476	−13.9%	12.93	31.7/km^{2}
Dosbarrios	2,248	2,367	−5.0%	111.59	20.1/km^{2}
Erustes	227	245	−7.3%	9.52	23.8/km^{2}
Escalona	3,672	3,420	+7.4%	73.15	50.2/km^{2}
Escalonilla	1,470	1,550	−5.2%	50.95	28.9/km^{2}
Espinoso del Rey	422	563	−25.0%	48.24	8.7/km^{2}
Esquivias	5,771	5,459	+5.7%	25.07	230.2/km^{2}
La Estrella	288	311	−7.4%	77.23	3.7/km^{2}
Fuensalida	12,322	11,208	+9.9%	68.37	180.2/km^{2}
Gálvez	2,991	3,324	−10.0%	55.00	54.4/km^{2}
Garciotum	212	175	+21.1%	22.73	9.3/km^{2}
Gerindote	2,632	2,434	+8.1%	44.24	59.5/km^{2}
Guadamur	1,806	1,855	−2.6%	37.83	47.7/km^{2}
La Guardia	2,148	2,358	−8.9%	195.59	11.0/km^{2}
Las Herencias	796	838	−5.0%	90.01	8.8/km^{2}
Herreruela de Oropesa	335	438	−23.5%	10.54	31.8/km^{2}
Hinojosa de San Vicente	392	452	−13.3%	31.06	12.6/km^{2}
Hontanar	148	202	−26.7%	151.77	1.0/km^{2}
Hormigos	952	811	+17.4%	27.48	34.6/km^{2}
Huecas	847	690	+22.8%	27.42	30.9/km^{2}
Huerta de Valdecarábanos	1,765	1,900	−7.1%	83.00	21.3/km^{2}
La Iglesuela del Tiétar	444	436	+1.8%	69.10	6.4/km^{2}
Illán de Vacas	3	1	+200.0%	9.15	0.3/km^{2}
Illescas	31,319	24,259	+29.1%	56.75	551.9/km^{2}
Lagartera	1,315	1,524	−13.7%	81.19	16.2/km^{2}
Layos	877	595	+47.4%	18.23	48.1/km^{2}
Lillo	2,528	3,045	−17.0%	151.40	16.7/km^{2}
Lominchar	2,632	2,307	+14.1%	22.26	118.2/km^{2}
Lucillos	611	642	−4.8%	40.55	15.1/km^{2}
Madridejos	10,151	11,164	−9.1%	262.01	38.7/km^{2}
Magán	4,043	3,087	+31.0%	29.24	138.3/km^{2}
Malpica de Tajo	1,676	2,059	−18.6%	79.59	21.1/km^{2}
Manzaneque	409	467	−12.4%	12.22	33.5/km^{2}
Maqueda	496	540	−8.1%	73.68	6.7/km^{2}
Marjaliza	258	310	−16.8%	65.79	3.9/km^{2}
Marrupe	158	177	−10.7%	10.50	15.0/km^{2}
Mascaraque	430	513	−16.2%	65.61	6.6/km^{2}
La Mata	889	993	−10.5%	19.18	46.4/km^{2}
Mazarambroz	1,258	1,316	−4.4%	216.03	5.8/km^{2}
Mejorada	1,380	1,318	+4.7%	46.17	29.9/km^{2}
Menasalbas	2,489	3,108	−19.9%	179.44	13.9/km^{2}
Méntrida	6,103	4,926	+23.9%	83.01	73.5/km^{2}
Mesegar de Tajo	206	238	−13.4%	17.66	11.7/km^{2}
Miguel Esteban	4,750	5,404	−12.1%	92.96	51.1/km^{2}
Mocejón	5,075	4,864	+4.3%	30.64	165.6/km^{2}
Mohedas de la Jara	395	502	−21.3%	60.42	6.5/km^{2}
Montearagón	571	559	+2.1%	11.97	47.7/km^{2}
Montesclaros	382	457	−16.4%	20.62	18.5/km^{2}
Mora	9,881	10,398	−5.0%	168.57	58.6/km^{2}
Nambroca	5,222	4,252	+22.8%	82.08	63.6/km^{2}
La Nava de Ricomalillo	507	653	−22.4%	39.53	12.8/km^{2}
Navahermosa	3,625	4,124	−12.1%	129.79	27.9/km^{2}
Navalcán	1,861	2,321	−19.8%	60.12	31.0/km^{2}
Navalmoralejo	50	72	−30.6%	22.75	2.2/km^{2}
Los Navalmorales	2,175	2,680	−18.8%	104.95	20.7/km^{2}
Los Navalucillos	1,956	2,540	−23.0%	356.04	5.5/km^{2}
Navamorcuende	605	681	−11.2%	110.81	5.5/km^{2}
Noblejas	3,889	3,653	+6.5%	69.67	55.8/km^{2}
Noez	941	978	−3.8%	34.22	27.5/km^{2}
Nombela	912	1,009	−9.6%	121.56	7.5/km^{2}
Novés	3,412	2,937	+16.2%	41.70	81.8/km^{2}
Numancia de la Sagra	5,474	4,902	+11.7%	29.51	185.5/km^{2}
Nuño Gómez	159	171	−7.0%	16.89	9.4/km^{2}
Ocaña	14,146	10,936	+29.4%	147.90	95.6/km^{2}
Olías del Rey	8,698	6,976	+24.7%	40.03	217.3/km^{2}
Ontígola	4,926	4,074	+20.9%	41.49	118.7/km^{2}
Orgaz	2,611	2,806	−6.9%	154.10	16.9/km^{2}
Oropesa	2,598	2,884	−9.9%	336.46	7.7/km^{2}
Otero	419	372	+12.6%	29.57	14.2/km^{2}
Palomeque	1,151	908	+26.8%	22.28	51.7/km^{2}
Pantoja	3,627	3,369	+7.7%	28.06	129.3/km^{2}
Paredes de Escalona	126	165	−23.6%	24.92	5.1/km^{2}
Parrillas	352	415	−15.2%	51.30	6.9/km^{2}
Pelahustán	337	368	−8.4%	44.34	7.6/km^{2}
Pepino	3,240	2,607	+24.3%	45.42	71.3/km^{2}
Polán	3,890	4,019	−3.2%	158.54	24.5/km^{2}
Portillo de Toledo	2,308	2,265	+1.9%	19.95	115.7/km^{2}
La Puebla de Almoradiel	5,021	5,890	−14.8%	106.13	47.3/km^{2}
La Puebla de Montalbán	7,908	8,349	−5.3%	141.34	56.0/km^{2}
La Pueblanueva	2,164	2,330	−7.1%	122.33	17.7/km^{2}
El Puente del Arzobispo	1,170	1,412	−17.1%	0.98	1,193.9/km^{2}
Puerto de San Vicente	163	247	−34.0%	46.51	3.5/km^{2}
Pulgar	1,534	1,685	−9.0%	38.60	39.7/km^{2}
Quero	1,057	1,260	−16.1%	104.38	10.1/km^{2}
Quintanar de la Orden	11,062	12,386	−10.7%	87.87	125.9/km^{2}
Quismondo	1,747	1,742	+0.3%	15.43	113.2/km^{2}
El Real de San Vicente	975	1,088	−10.4%	53.77	18.1/km^{2}
Recas	5,006	4,185	+19.6%	31.11	160.9/km^{2}
Retamoso de la Jara	109	119	−8.4%	48.24	2.3/km^{2}
Rielves	818	801	+2.1%	32.65	25.1/km^{2}
Robledo del Mazo	247	368	−32.9%	136.68	1.8/km^{2}
El Romeral	570	741	−23.1%	78.92	7.2/km^{2}
San Bartolomé de las Abiertas	619	559	+10.7%	56.86	10.9/km^{2}
San Martín de Montalbán	734	833	−11.9%	133.03	5.5/km^{2}
San Martín de Pusa	595	829	−28.2%	104.54	5.7/km^{2}
San Pablo de los Montes	1,711	2,234	−23.4%	100.05	17.1/km^{2}
San Román de los Montes	2,072	1,854	+11.8%	44.85	46.2/km^{2}
Santa Ana de Pusa	347	526	−34.0%	19.44	17.8/km^{2}
Santa Cruz de la Zarza	4,160	4,785	−13.1%	264.29	15.7/km^{2}
Santa Cruz del Retamar	3,895	3,058	+27.4%	129.46	30.1/km^{2}
Santa Olalla	3,480	3,451	+0.8%	72.61	47.9/km^{2}
Santo Domingo-Caudilla	1,166	1,056	+10.4%	53.80	21.7/km^{2}
Sartajada	109	108	+0.9%	15.31	7.1/km^{2}
Segurilla	1,408	1,324	+6.3%	22.77	61.8/km^{2}
Seseña	29,187	18,773	+55.5%	71.41	408.7/km^{2}
Sevilleja de la Jara	648	838	−22.7%	233.95	2.8/km^{2}
Sonseca	11,195	11,535	−2.9%	59.93	186.8/km^{2}
Sotillo de las Palomas	175	212	−17.5%	18.85	9.3/km^{2}
Talavera de la Reina	84,102	87,676	−4.1%	187.12	449.5/km^{2}
Tembleque	1,967	2,325	−15.4%	223.07	8.8/km^{2}
El Toboso	1,701	2,124	−19.9%	143.94	11.8/km^{2}
Toledo†	85,818	83,872	+2.3%	232.14	369.7/km^{2}
Torralba de Oropesa	192	277	−30.7%	23.45	8.2/km^{2}
Torrecilla de la Jara	213	282	−24.5%	70.61	3.0/km^{2}
La Torre de Esteban Hambrán	1,859	1,795	+3.6%	50.70	36.7/km^{2}
Torrico	704	858	−17.9%	33.53	21.0/km^{2}
Torrijos	13,945	13,378	+4.2%	17.39	801.9/km^{2}
Totanés	356	418	−14.8%	26.04	13.7/km^{2}
Turleque	703	860	−18.3%	100.85	7.0/km^{2}
Ugena	5,750	5,248	+9.6%	15.48	371.4/km^{2}
Urda	2,487	3,018	−17.6%	217.82	11.4/km^{2}
Valdeverdeja	554	713	−22.3%	67.90	8.2/km^{2}
Valmojado	4,688	4,137	+13.3%	26.18	179.1/km^{2}
Velada	2,901	2,876	+0.9%	144.83	20.0/km^{2}
Las Ventas con Peña Aguilera	1,165	1,325	−12.1%	140.09	8.3/km^{2}
Las Ventas de Retamosa	4,103	3,327	+23.3%	18.90	217.1/km^{2}
Las Ventas de San Julián	232	222	+4.5%	6.53	35.5/km^{2}
Villacañas	9,603	10,519	−8.7%	268.51	35.8/km^{2}
La Villa de Don Fadrique	3,564	4,410	−19.2%	83.16	42.9/km^{2}
Villafranca de los Caballeros	4,877	5,386	−9.5%	106.69	45.7/km^{2}
Villaluenga de la Sagra	4,164	4,083	+2.0%	27.01	154.2/km^{2}
Villamiel de Toledo	1,068	927	+15.2%	41.67	25.6/km^{2}
Villaminaya	508	580	−12.4%	21.28	23.9/km^{2}
Villamuelas	616	731	−15.7%	43.36	14.2/km^{2}
Villanueva de Alcardete	2,992	3,678	−18.7%	147.26	20.3/km^{2}
Villanueva de Bogas	696	813	−14.4%	57.44	12.1/km^{2}
Villarejo de Montalbán	71	68	+4.4%	65.37	1.1/km^{2}
Villarrubia de Santiago	2,534	2,792	−9.2%	155.29	16.3/km^{2}
Villaseca de la Sagra	1,895	1,845	+2.7%	31.65	59.9/km^{2}
Villasequilla	2,607	2,647	−1.5%	76.95	33.9/km^{2}
Villatobas	2,756	2,679	+2.9%	181.58	15.2/km^{2}
El Viso de San Juan	5,978	3,896	+53.4%	53.06	112.7/km^{2}
Los Yébenes	5,715	6,332	−9.7%	676.16	8.5/km^{2}
Yeles	6,263	5,170	+21.1%	20.48	305.8/km^{2}
Yepes	5,483	5,226	+4.9%	84.97	64.5/km^{2}
Yuncler	4,866	3,712	+31.1%	17.56	277.1/km^{2}
Yunclillos	823	852	−3.4%	31.28	26.3/km^{2}
Yuncos	12,009	10,587	+13.4%	15.25	787.5/km^{2}
Province of Toledo	731,112	705,516	+3.6%	15,368.56	47.6/km^{2}
Castilla–La Mancha	2,084,086	2,106,331	−1.1%	79,410.62	26.2/km^{2}
Spain	48,085,361	46,815,916	+2.7%	504,755.17	95.3/km^{2}

== See also ==
- Geography of Spain
- List of municipalities of Spain
