= Navalcán =

Coordinates: 40.068°N 5.093°W

Navalcán, Spain
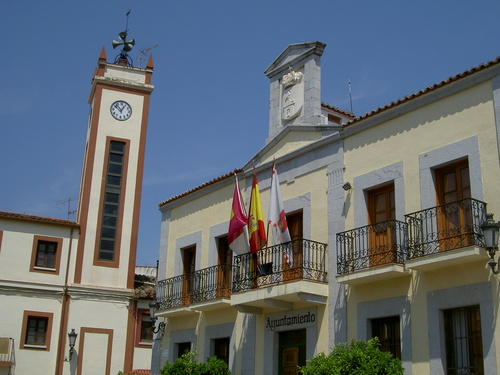
- Navalcán Town Hall

- Coat of arms
- Interactive map of Navalcán, Spain
- Country: Spain
- Autonomous community: Castile-La Mancha
- Province: Toledo
- Municipality: Navalcán

Area
  - Total: 60 km^{2} (23 sq mi)
- Elevation: 394 m (1,293 ft)

Population (2025-01-01)
  - Total: 1,859
  - Density: 31/km^{2} (80/sq mi)
- Time zone: UTC+1 (CET)
  - Summer (DST): UTC+2 (CEST)

Navalcán is a municipality located in the province of Toledo, Castile-La Mancha, Spain. According to the 2006 census (INE), the municipality has a population of 2238 inhabitants.
