= Paredes de Escalona =

Coordinates: 40°12′N 4°25′W

- municipality
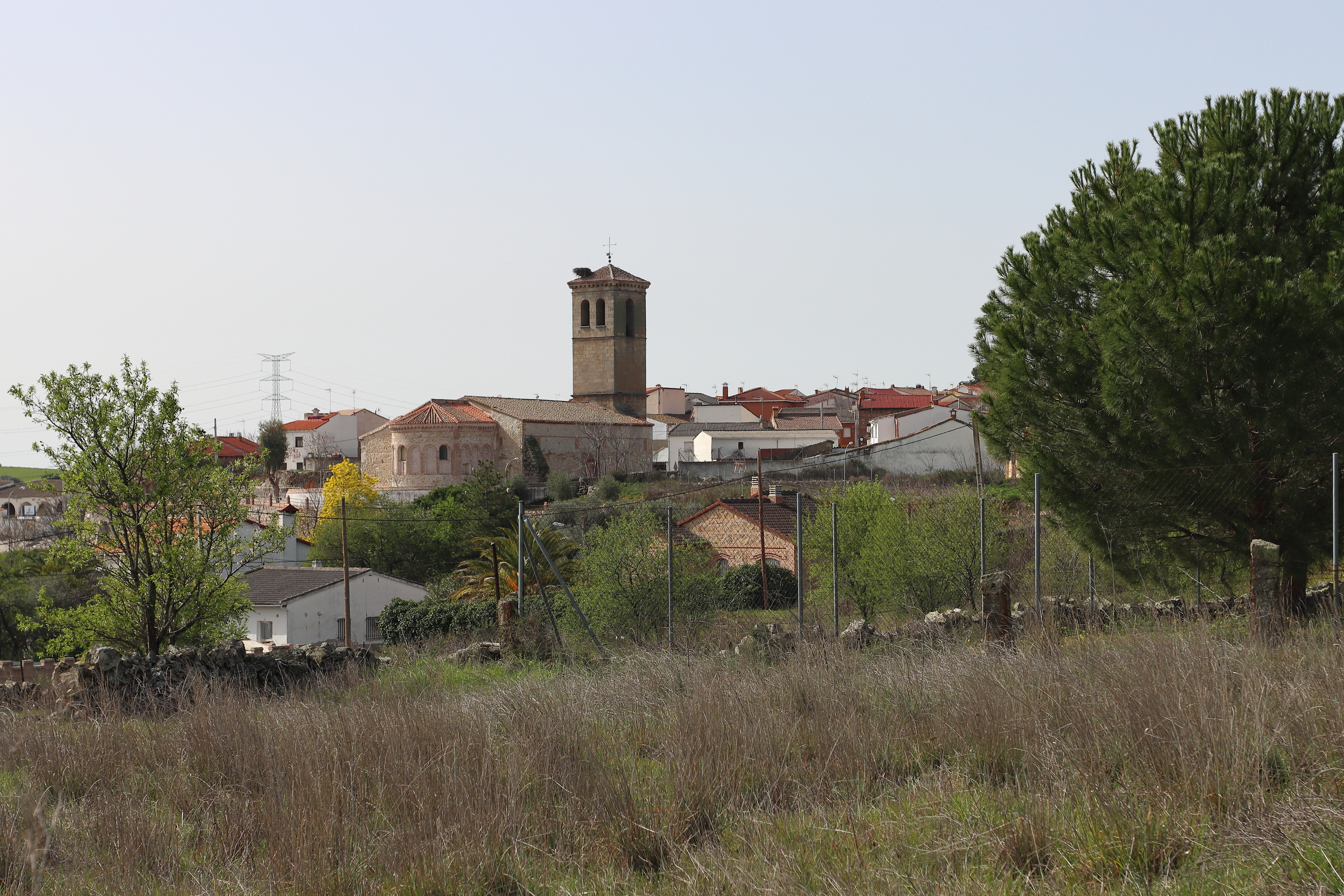
- View of Paredes de Escalona

- Coat of arms
- Interactive map of Paredes de Escalona
- Country: Spain
- Autonomous community: Castile-La Mancha
- Province: Toledo
- Municipality: Paredes de Escalona

Area
  - Total: 25 km^{2} (9.7 sq mi)
- Elevation: 490 m (1,610 ft)

Population (2025-01-01)
  - Total: 133
  - Density: 5.3/km^{2} (14/sq mi)
- Time zone: UTC+1 (CET)
  - Summer (DST): UTC+2 (CEST)

Paredes de Escalona is a municipality located in the province of Toledo, Castile-La Mancha, Spain. According to the 2006 census (INE), the municipality has a population of 145 inhabitants.
