= Mesegar de Tajo =

Coordinates: 39.928°N 4.503°W

- municipality
- Flag Coat of arms
- Interactive map of Mesegar de Tajo
- Country: Spain
- Autonomous community: Castile-La Mancha
- Province: Toledo
- Municipality: Mesegar de Tajo

Area
  - Total: 18 km^{2} (6.9 sq mi)
- Elevation: 478 m (1,568 ft)

Population (2025-01-01)
  - Total: 199
  - Density: 11/km^{2} (29/sq mi)
- Time zone: UTC+1 (CET)
  - Summer (DST): UTC+2 (CEST)

Mesegar de Tajo is a municipality located in the province of Toledo, Castile-La Mancha, Spain. According to the 2006 census (INE), the municipality has a population of 246 inhabitants.

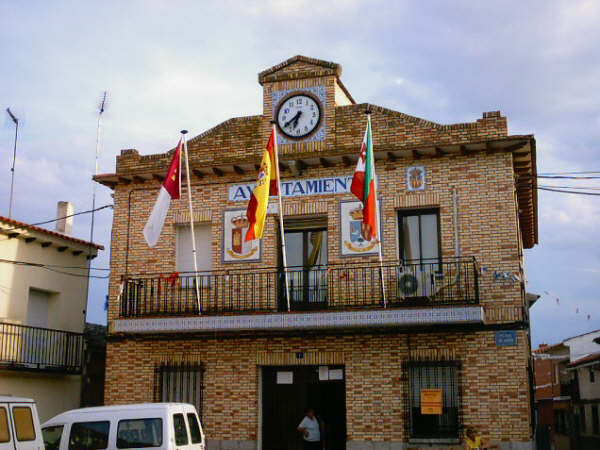
Town Hall of Mesegar de Tajo
