= Yunclillos =

- Municipality
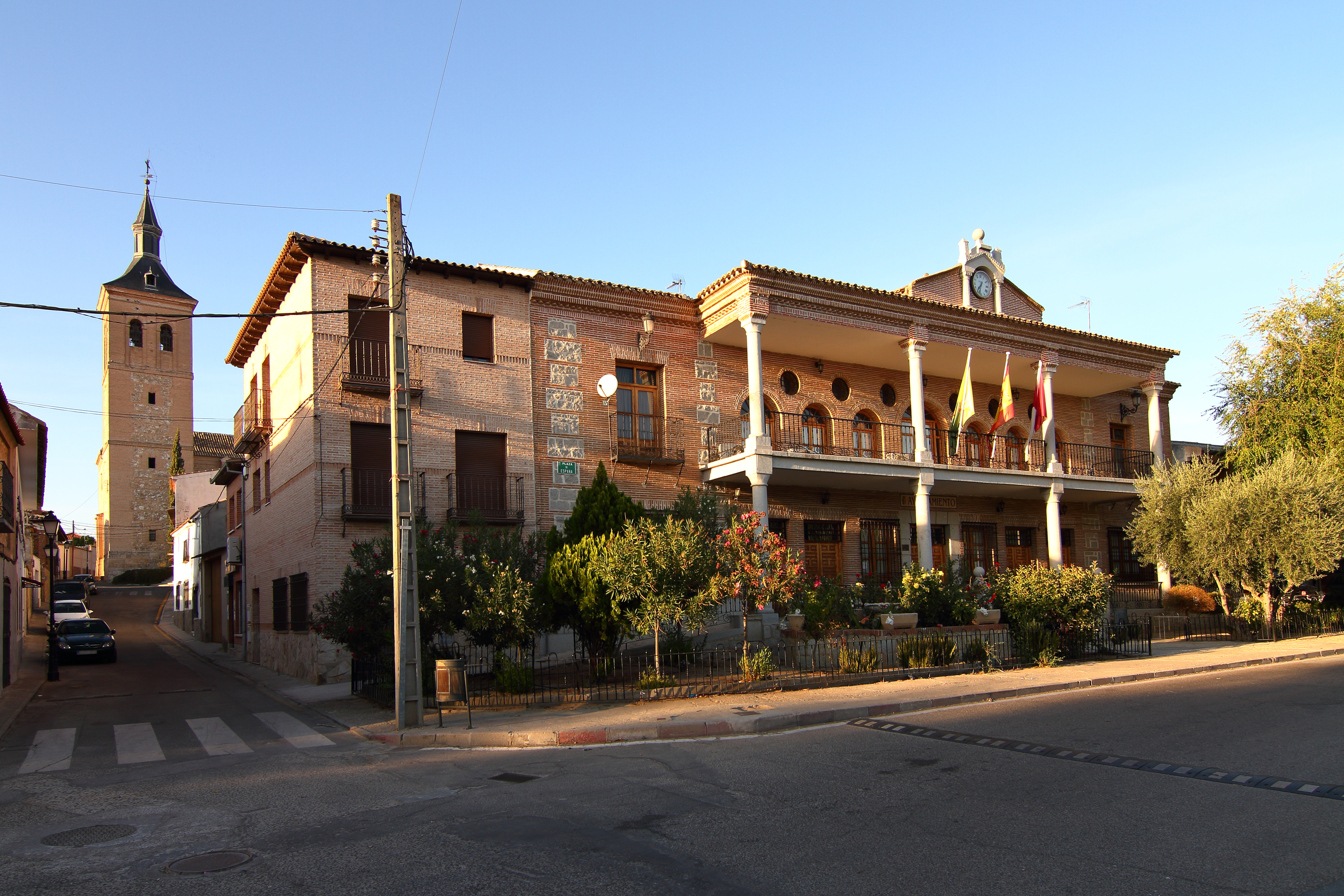
- Town hall

- Flag Coat of arms

- Location in Spain
- Coordinates: 40°1′18″N 3°59′11″W
- Country: Spain
- Autonomous community: Castile-La Mancha
- Province: Toledo
- Municipality: Yunclillos

Area
  - Total: 31 km^{2} (12 sq mi)
- Elevation: 517 m (1,696 ft)

Population (2025-01-01)
  - Total: 819
  - Density: 26/km^{2} (68/sq mi)
- Time zone: UTC+1 (CET)
  - Summer (DST): UTC+2 (CEST)

Yunclillos is a municipality located in the province of Toledo, Castile-La Mancha, Spain. According to the 2006 census (INE), the municipality has a population of 706 inhabitants.

== Demographics ==
Historical population
| Year | Pop. | ±% |
|---|---|---|
| 1900 | 695 | — |
| 1910 | 753 | +8.3% |
| 1920 | 885 | +17.5% |
| 1930 | 960 | +8.5% |
| 1940 | 925 | −3.6% |
| 1950 | 907 | −1.9% |
| 1960 | 757 | −16.5% |
| 1970 | 613 | −19.0% |
| 1981 | 548 | −10.6% |
| 1991 | 565 | +3.1% |
| 2001 | 606 | +7.3% |
| 2011 | 845 | +39.4% |
| 2021 | 789 | −6.6% |
| 2023 | 820 | +3.9% |
Source:INE
