= Camarenilla =

Coordinates: 40°01′N 4°05′W

- municipality
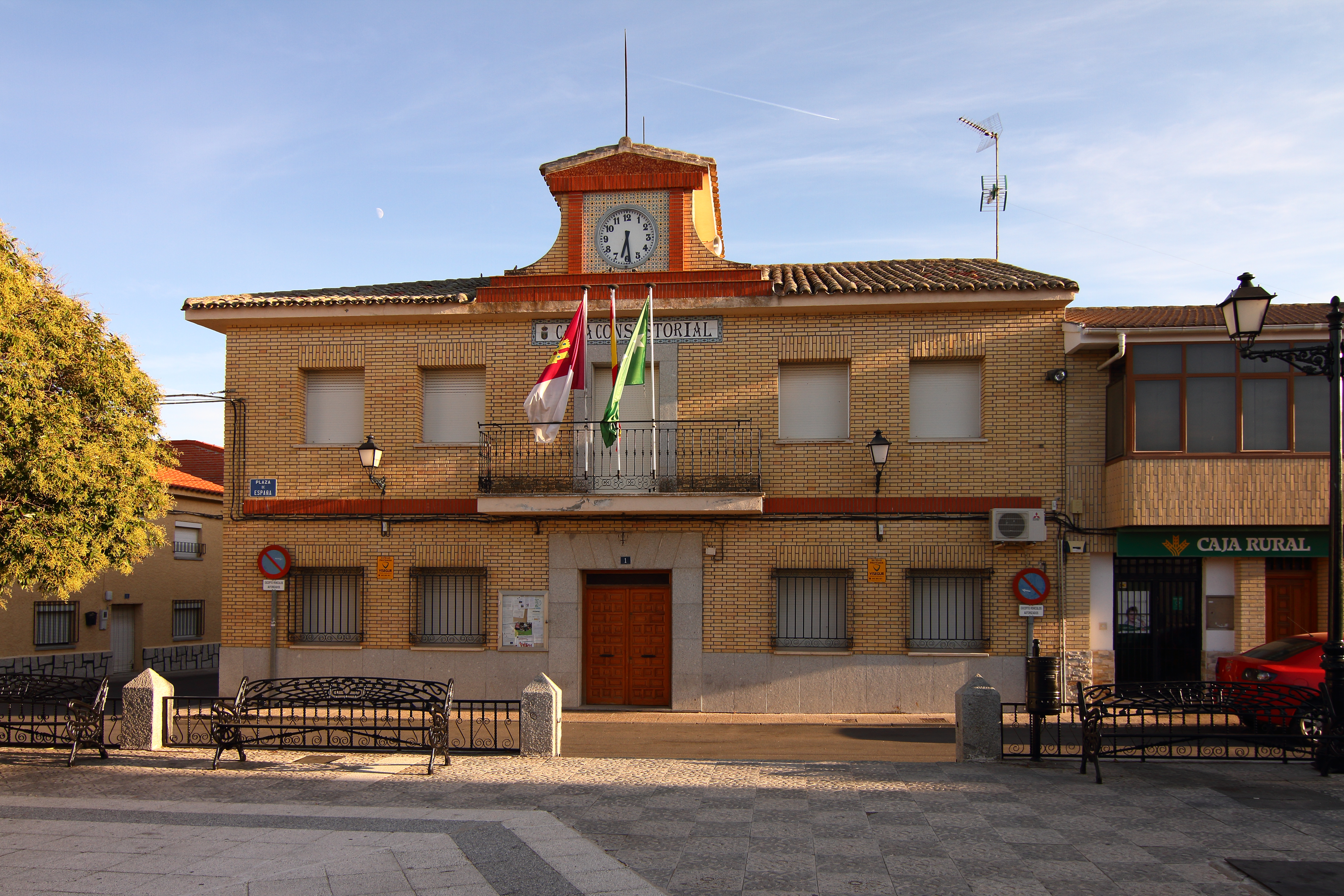
- Town Hall

- Flag Coat of arms
- Interactive map of Camarenilla
- Country: Spain
- Autonomous community: Castile-La Mancha
- Province: Toledo
- Municipality: Camarenilla

Area
  - Total: 24 km^{2} (9.3 sq mi)
- Elevation: 506 m (1,660 ft)

Population (2025-01-01)
  - Total: 606
  - Density: 25/km^{2} (65/sq mi)
- Time zone: UTC+1 (CET)
  - Summer (DST): UTC+2 (CEST)

Camarenilla is a municipality located in the province of Toledo, Castile-La Mancha, Spain. At the time of 2006 census (INE), the municipality had a population of 563 inhabitants.

== Demographics ==
Historical population
| Year | Pop. | ±% |
|---|---|---|
| 1900 | 330 | — |
| 1910 | 354 | +7.3% |
| 1920 | 417 | +17.8% |
| 1930 | 424 | +1.7% |
| 1940 | 428 | +0.9% |
| 1950 | 502 | +17.3% |
| 1960 | 494 | −1.6% |
| 1970 | 579 | +17.2% |
| 1981 | 587 | +1.4% |
| 1991 | 533 | −9.2% |
| 2001 | 533 | +0.0% |
| 2011 | 632 | +18.6% |
| 2021 | 588 | −7.0% |
| 2023 | 629 | +7.0% |
Source: INE
