= Sartajada =

Coordinates: 40°13′N 4°47′W

- municipality
- Interactive map of Sartajada
- Country: Spain
- Autonomous community: Castile-La Mancha
- Province: Toledo
- Municipality: Sartajada

Area
  - Total: 15 km^{2} (5.8 sq mi)
- Elevation: 360 m (1,180 ft)

Population (2025-01-01)
  - Total: 104
  - Density: 6.9/km^{2} (18/sq mi)
- Time zone: UTC+1 (CET)
  - Summer (DST): UTC+2 (CEST)

Sartajada is a municipality located in the province of Toledo, Castile-La Mancha, Spain. According to the 2006 census (INE), the municipality has a population of 127 inhabitants.

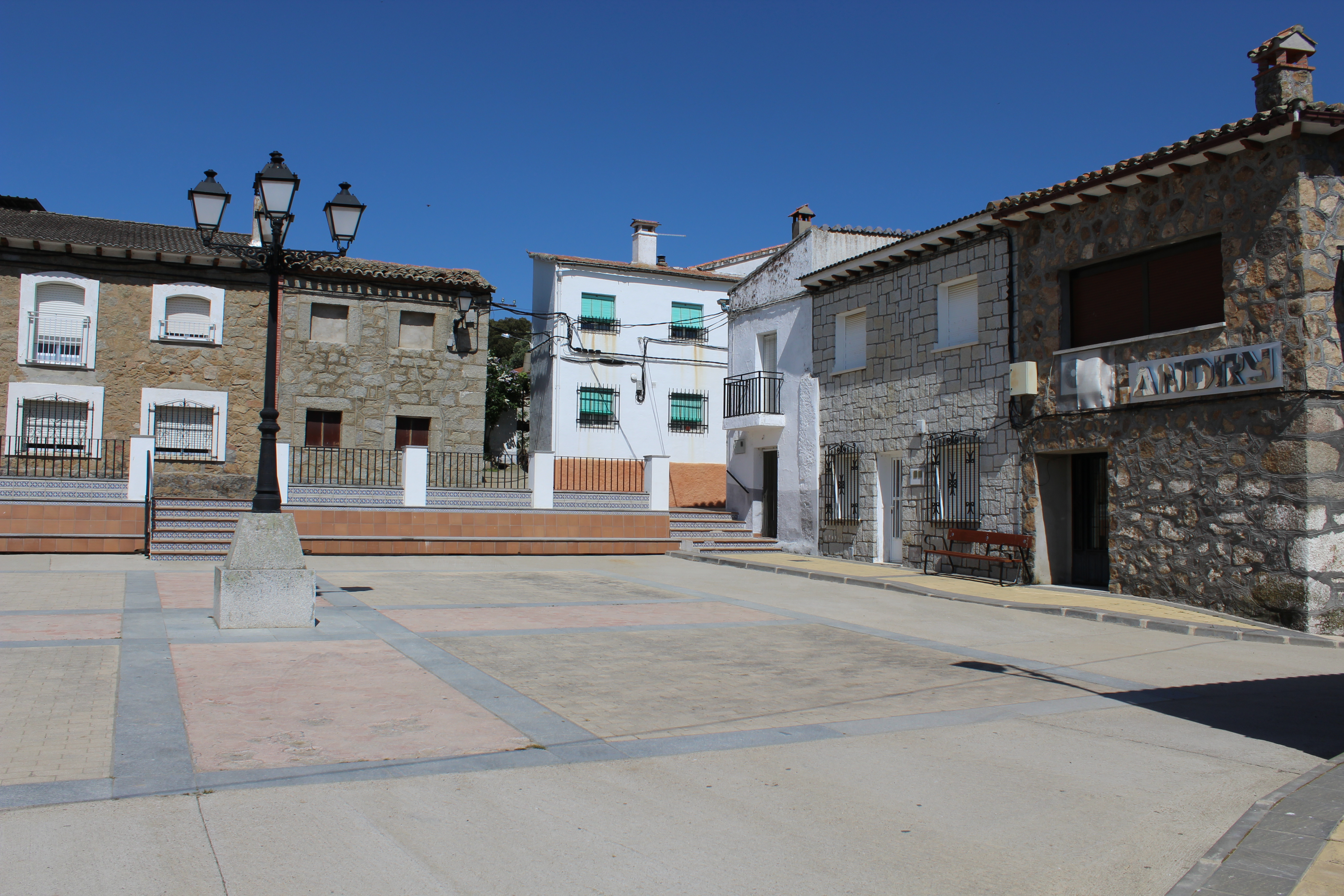
Sartajada Square
