= Sotillo de las Palomas =

Coordinates: 40°06′N 4°49′W

- municipality
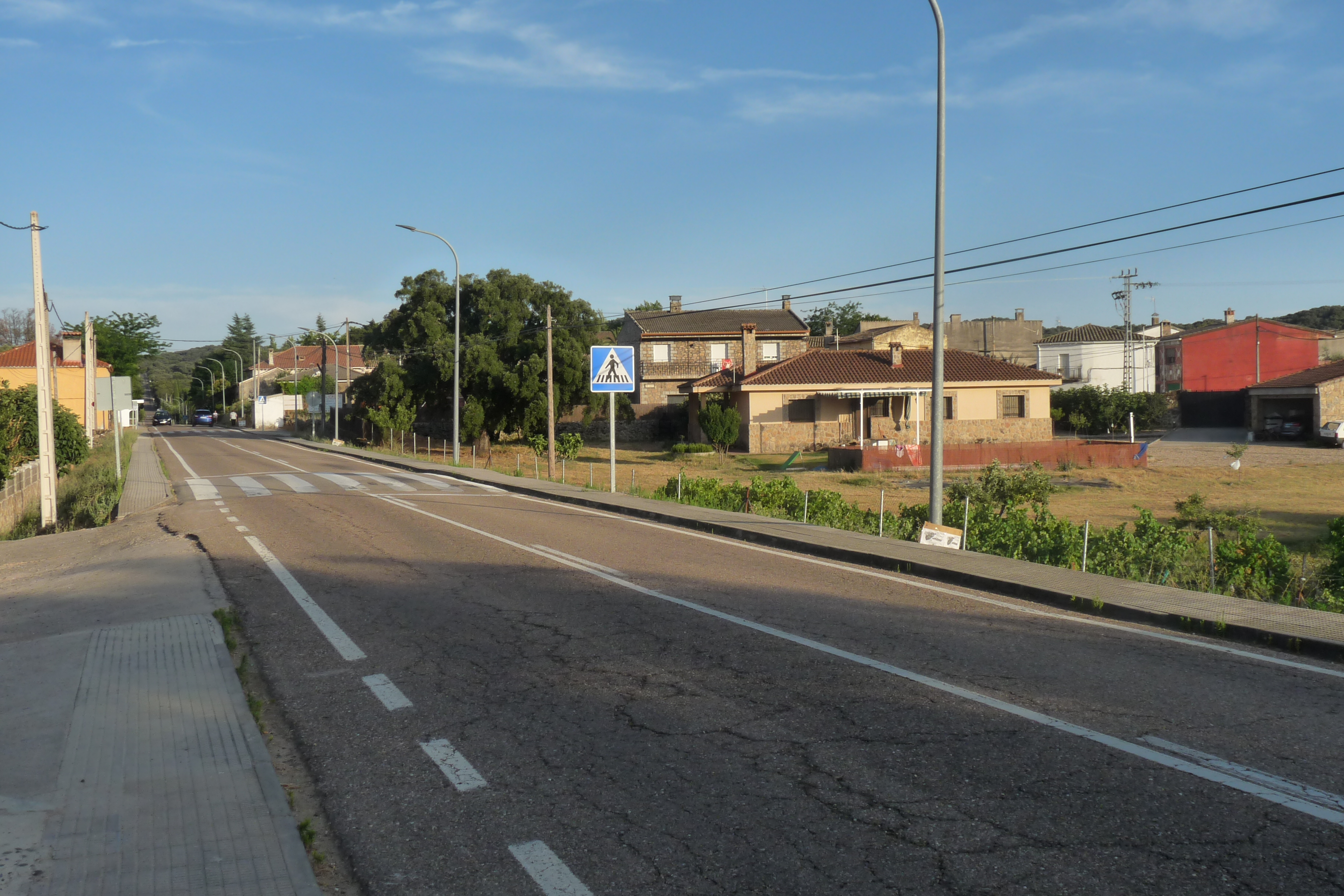
- View of Sotillo de las Palomas with CM5100 in the foreground

- Flag Coat of arms
- Interactive map of Sotillo de las Palomas
- Country: Spain
- Autonomous community: Castile-La Mancha
- Province: Toledo
- Municipality: Sotillo de las Palomas

Area
  - Total: 19 km^{2} (7.3 sq mi)
- Elevation: 563 m (1,847 ft)

Population (2025-01-01)
  - Total: 184
  - Density: 9.7/km^{2} (25/sq mi)
- Time zone: UTC+1 (CET)
  - Summer (DST): UTC+2 (CEST)

Sotillo de las Palomas is a municipality located in the province of Toledo, Castile-La Mancha, Spain. According to the 2006 census (INE), the municipality has a population of 211 inhabitants.
