= Burujón =

Coordinates: 39°54′N 4°18′W

Burujón, Spain
- Coat of arms

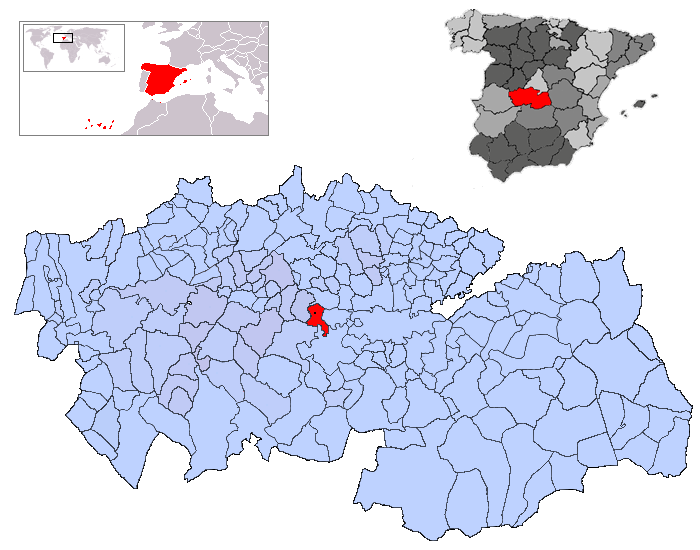
- Country: Spain
- Autonomous community: Castile-La Mancha
- Province: Toledo
- Municipality: Burujón

Area
  - Total: 35 km^{2} (14 sq mi)
- Elevation: 504 m (1,654 ft)

Population (2025-01-01)
  - Total: 1,344
  - Density: 38/km^{2} (99/sq mi)
- Time zone: UTC+1 (CET)
  - Summer (DST): UTC+2 (CEST)

Burujón is a municipality located in the province of Toledo, Castile-La Mancha, Spain. According to the 2006 census (INE), the municipality has a population of 1376 inhabitants.

== Demographics ==
Historical population
Year	Pop.	±%
1900	840	—
1910	991	+18.0%
1920	1,143	+15.3%
1930	1,309	+14.5%
1940	1,270	−3.0%
1950	1,509	+18.8%
1960	1,551	+2.8%
1970	1,380	−11.0%
1981	1,210	−12.3%
1991	1,246	+3.0%
2001	1,292	+3.7%
2011	1,463	+13.2%
2021	1,304	−10.9%
2023	1,300	−0.3%
Source: ISTAT
