= Hinojosa de San Vicente =

Coordinates: 40°06′N 4°43′W

- municipality
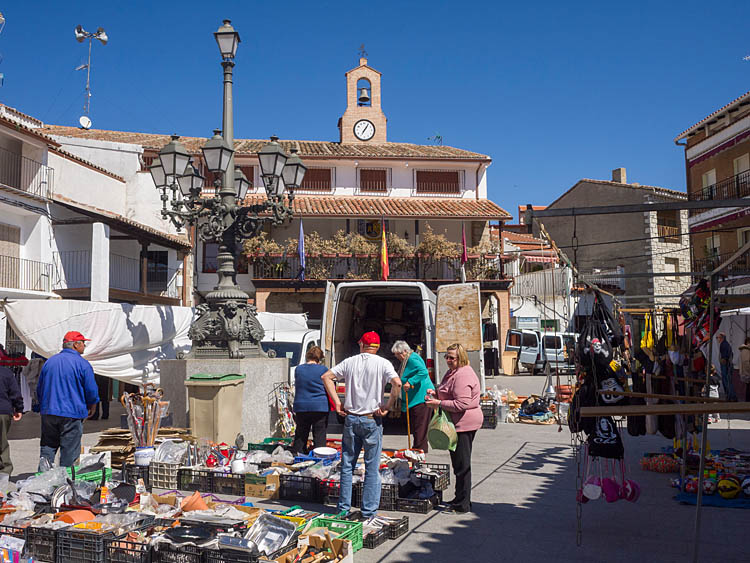
- Hinojosa de San Vicente Town Hall

- Coat of arms
- Interactive map of Hinojosa de San Vicente
- Country: Spain
- Autonomous community: Castile-La Mancha
- Province: Toledo
- Municipality: Hinojosa de San Vicente

Area
  - Total: 31 km^{2} (12 sq mi)
- Elevation: 1,320 m (4,330 ft)

Population (2025-01-01)
  - Total: 363
  - Density: 12/km^{2} (30/sq mi)
- Time zone: UTC+1 (CET)
  - Summer (DST): UTC+2 (CEST)

Hinojosa de San Vicente is a municipality located in the province of Toledo, Castile-La Mancha, Spain. According to the 2006 census (INE), the municipality has a population of 481 inhabitants.
