= Lominchar =

Coordinates: 40°05′N 3°57′W

- municipality
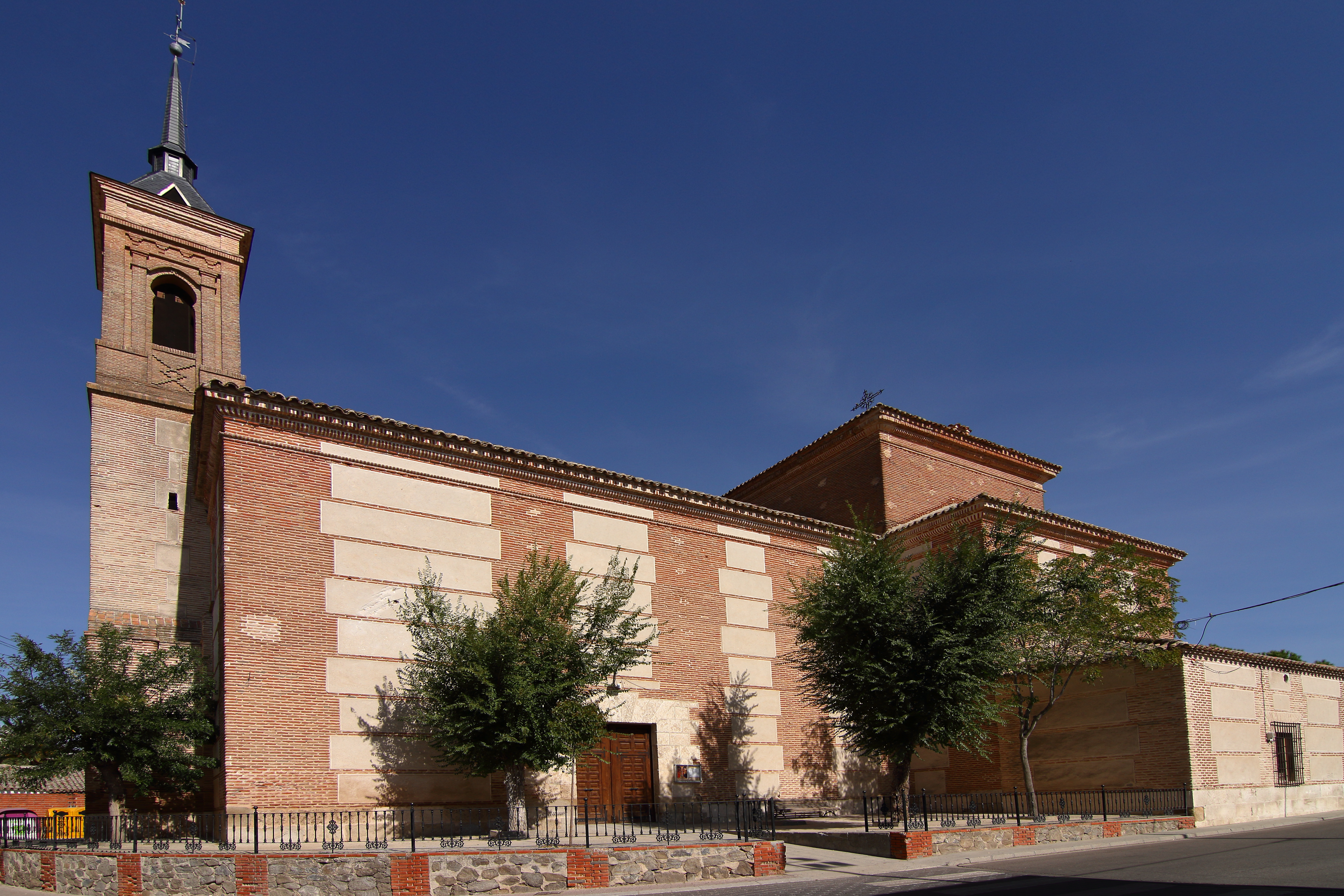
- Church of San Esteban Protomartyr in Lominchar
- Flag Seal
- Interactive map of Lominchar
- Country: Spain
- Autonomous community: Castile-La Mancha
- Province: Toledo
- Municipality: Lominchar

Area
  - Total: 22 km^{2} (8.5 sq mi)
- Elevation: 645 m (2,116 ft)

Population (2025-01-01)
  - Total: 2,989
  - Density: 140/km^{2} (350/sq mi)
- Time zone: UTC+1 (CET)
  - Summer (DST): UTC+2 (CEST)

Lominchar is a municipality located in the province of Toledo, Castile-La Mancha, Spain. According to the 2006 census (INE), the municipality has a population of 1429 inhabitants.
