= Casasbuenas =

Coordinates: 39°46′N 4°08′W

- municipality
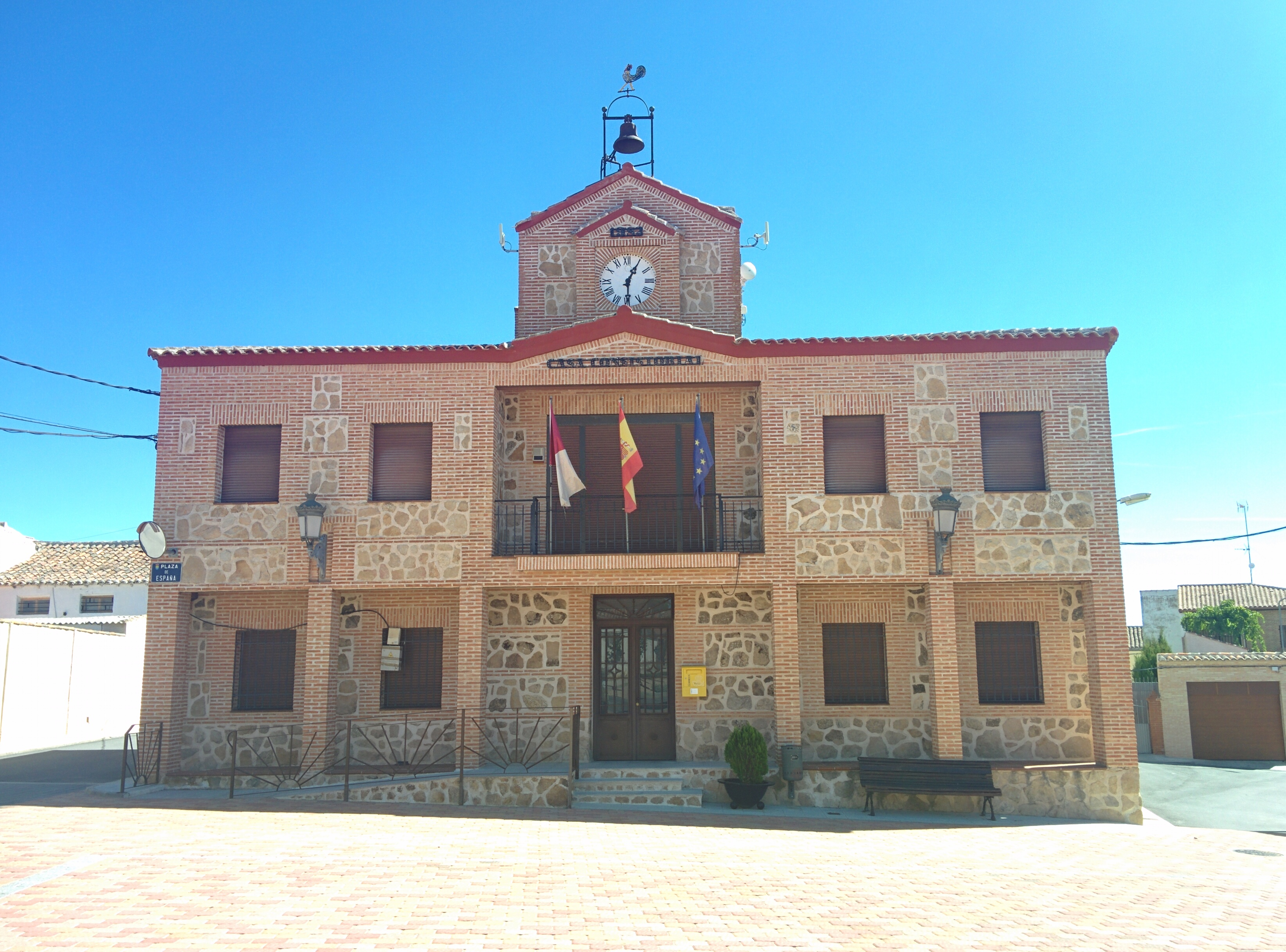
- Town Hall

- Coat of arms
- Interactive map of Casasbuenas
- Country: Spain
- Autonomous community: Castile-La Mancha
- Province: Toledo
- Municipality: Casasbuenas

Area
  - Total: 30 km^{2} (12 sq mi)
- Elevation: 682 m (2,238 ft)

Population (2025-01-01)
  - Total: 210
  - Density: 7.0/km^{2} (18/sq mi)
- Time zone: UTC+1 (CET)
  - Summer (DST): UTC+2 (CEST)

Casasbuenas is a municipality located in the province of Toledo, Castile-La Mancha, Spain. According to the 2006 census (INE), the municipality has a population of 232 inhabitants.

== Demographics ==
Historical population
Year	Pop.	±%
1900	422	—
1910	415	−1.7%
1920	431	+3.9%
1930	484	+12.3%
1940	508	+5.0%
1950	478	−5.9%
1960	425	−11.1%
1970	313	−26.4%
1981	306	−2.2%
1991	279	−8.8%
2001	229	−17.9%
2011	206	−10.0%
2021	182	−11.7%
2023	178	−2.2%
Source: INE
