= Arcicóllar =

Coordinates: 40°03′N 4°07′W

Arcicóllar, Spain
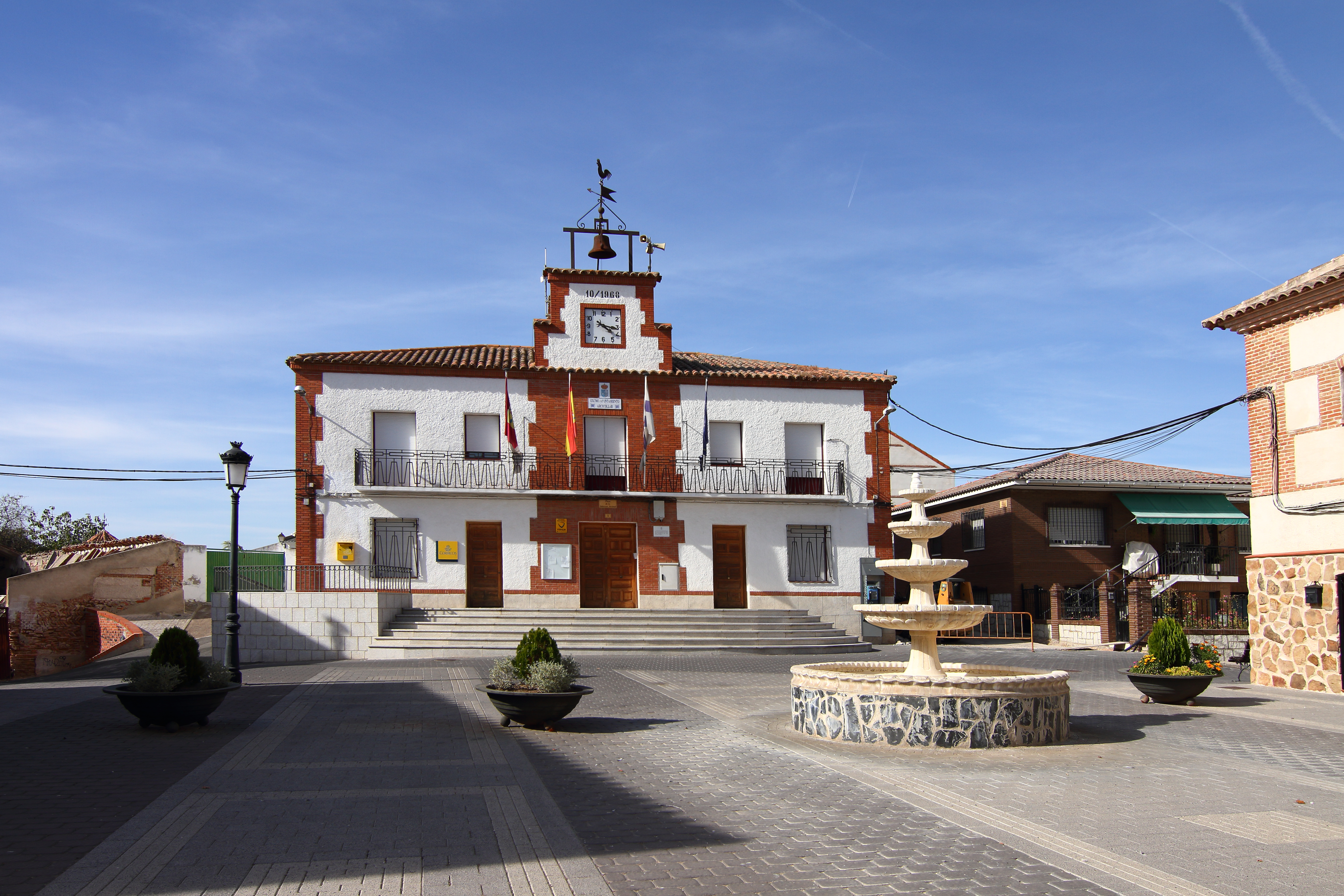

- Flag Coat of arms

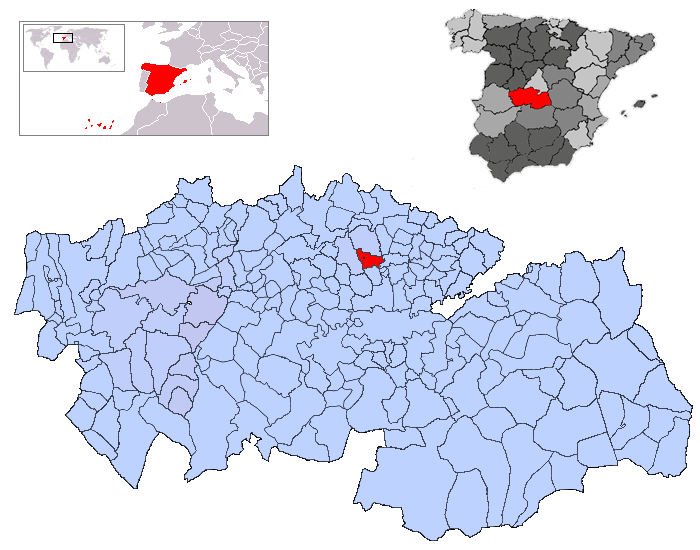
- Country: Spain
- Autonomous community: Castile-La Mancha
- Province: Toledo
- Municipality: Arcicóllar

Area
  - Total: 31 km^{2} (12 sq mi)
- Elevation: 544 m (1,785 ft)

Population (2025-01-01)
  - Total: 1,089
  - Density: 35/km^{2} (91/sq mi)
- Time zone: UTC+1 (CET)
  - Summer (DST): UTC+2 (CEST)

Arcicóllar is a municipality located in the province of Toledo, Castile-La Mancha, Spain. According to the 2006 census (INE), the municipality has a population of 720 inhabitants.

== Demographics ==
Historical population
| Year | Pop. | ±% |
|---|---|---|
| 1900 | 507 | — |
| 1910 | 636 | +25.4% |
| 1920 | 768 | +20.8% |
| 1930 | 756 | −1.6% |
| 1940 | 614 | −18.8% |
| 1950 | 685 | +11.6% |
| 1960 | 597 | −12.8% |
| 1970 | 519 | −13.1% |
| 1981 | 452 | −12.9% |
| 1991 | 436 | −3.5% |
| 2001 | 551 | +26.4% |
| 2011 | 811 | +47.2% |
| 2021 | 964 | +18.9% |
| 2023 | 1,075 | +11.5% |
Source: ISTAT
