= Hormigos =

Coordinates: 40°06′N 4°26′W

- municipality
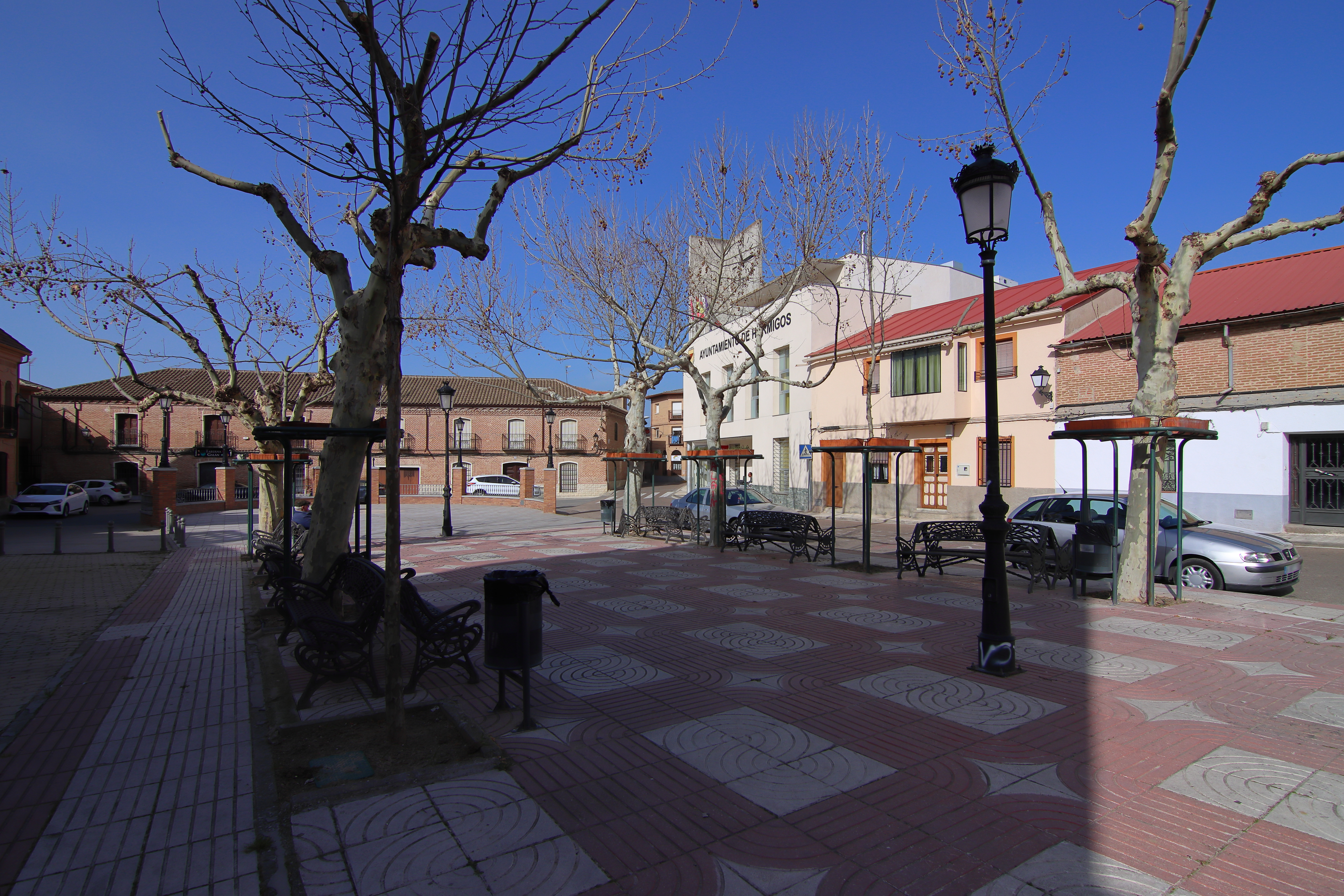

- Coat of arms
- Interactive map of Hormigos
- Country: Spain
- Autonomous community: Castile-La Mancha
- Province: Toledo
- Municipality: Hormigos

Area
  - Total: 28 km^{2} (11 sq mi)
- Elevation: 457 m (1,499 ft)

Population (2025-01-01)
  - Total: 1,035
  - Density: 37/km^{2} (96/sq mi)
- Time zone: UTC+1 (CET)
  - Summer (DST): UTC+2 (CEST)

Hormigos is a municipality located in the province of Toledo, Castile-La Mancha, Spain. According to the 2006 census (INE), the municipality has a population of 480 inhabitants.
