= Las Ventas de Retamosa =

Coordinates: 40°09′N 4°07′W

- municipality
- Flag Coat of arms
- Interactive map of Las Ventas de Retamosa
- Country: Spain
- Autonomous community: Castile-La Mancha
- Province: Toledo
- Municipality: Las Ventas de Retamosa

Area
  - Total: 19 km^{2} (7.3 sq mi)
- Elevation: 618 m (2,028 ft)

Population (2025-01-01)
  - Total: 4,206
  - Density: 220/km^{2} (570/sq mi)
- Time zone: UTC+1 (CET)
  - Summer (DST): UTC+2 (CEST)

Las Ventas de Retamosa is a municipality located in the province of Toledo, Castilla–La Mancha, Spain. According to the 2006 census (INE), the municipality has a population of 1782 inhabitants.

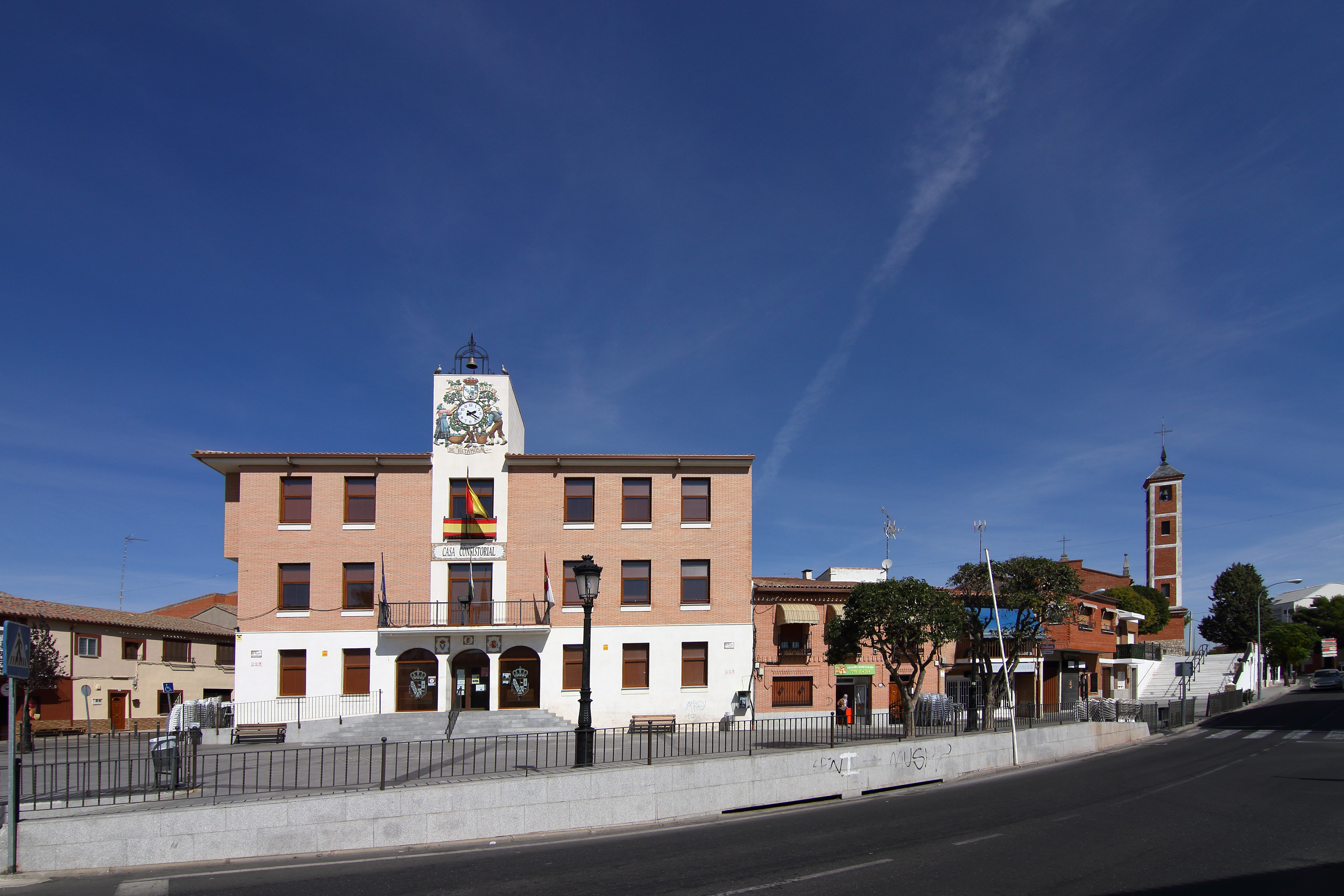
Constitution Square in Las Ventas de Retamosa
