= Caleruela =

Coordinates: 39°52′N 5°15′W

- municipality
- Flag Coat of arms

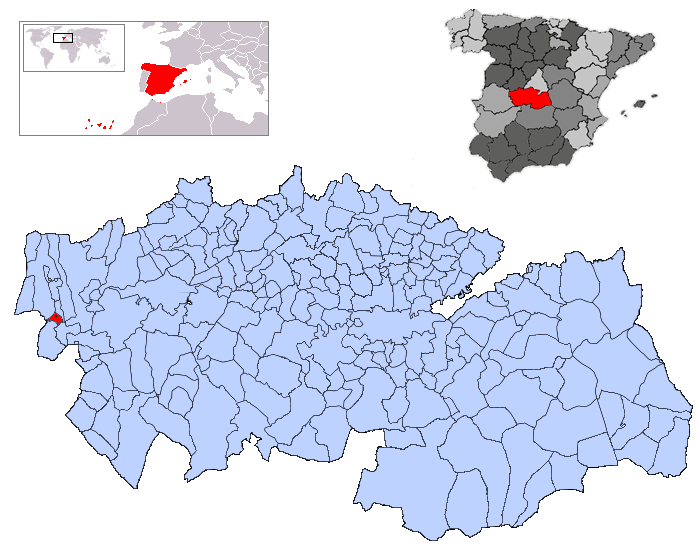
- Country: Spain
- Autonomous community: Castile-La Mancha
- Province: Toledo
- Municipality: Caleruela

Area
  - Total: 9 km^{2} (3.5 sq mi)
- Elevation: 322 m (1,056 ft)

Population (2025-01-01)
  - Total: 203
  - Density: 23/km^{2} (58/sq mi)
- Time zone: UTC+1 (CET)
  - Summer (DST): UTC+2 (CEST)

Caleruela is a municipality located in the province of Toledo, Castile-La Mancha, Spain. According to the 2006 census (INE), the municipality has a population of 295 inhabitants.

== Demographics ==
Historical population
Year	Pop.	±%
1900	491	—
1910	800	+62.9%
1920	815	+1.9%
1930	1,002	+22.9%
1940	1,050	+4.8%
1950	1,119	+6.6%
1960	1,046	−6.5%
1970	649	−38.0%
1981	463	−28.7%
1991	361	−22.0%
2001	296	−18.0%
2011	283	−4.4%
2021	214	−24.4%
2023	202	−5.6%
Source: INE
