= Palomeque =

Coordinates: 40°07′N 3°57′W

Palomeque, Spain
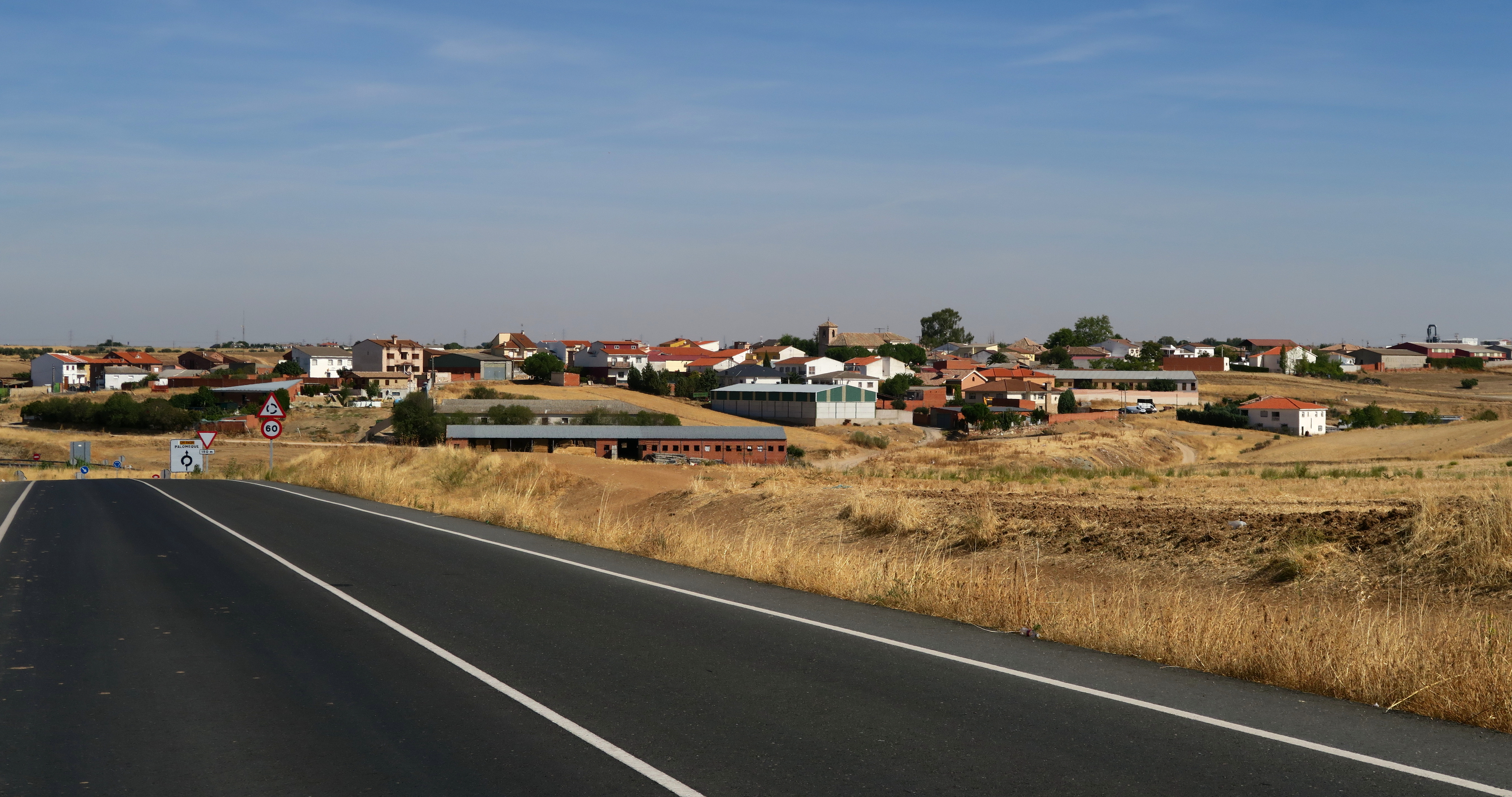
- Palomeque from CM-9421 Road

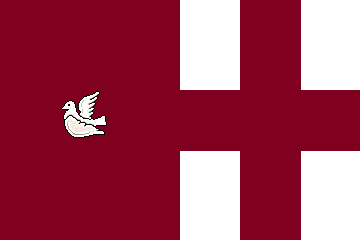
- Flag Coat of arms
- Interactive map of Palomeque, Spain
- Country: Spain
- Autonomous community: Castile-La Mancha
- Province: Toledo
- Municipality: Palomeque

Area
  - Total: 22 km^{2} (8.5 sq mi)
- Elevation: 610 m (2,000 ft)

Population (2025-01-01)
  - Total: 1,213
  - Density: 55/km^{2} (140/sq mi)
- Time zone: UTC+1 (CET)
  - Summer (DST): UTC+2 (CEST)

Palomeque is a municipality located in the province of Toledo, Castile-La Mancha, Spain. According to the 2006 census (INE), the municipality had a population of 739 inhabitants.
