= Santa Cruz del Retamar =

Coordinates: 40°07′N 4°14′W

- municipality
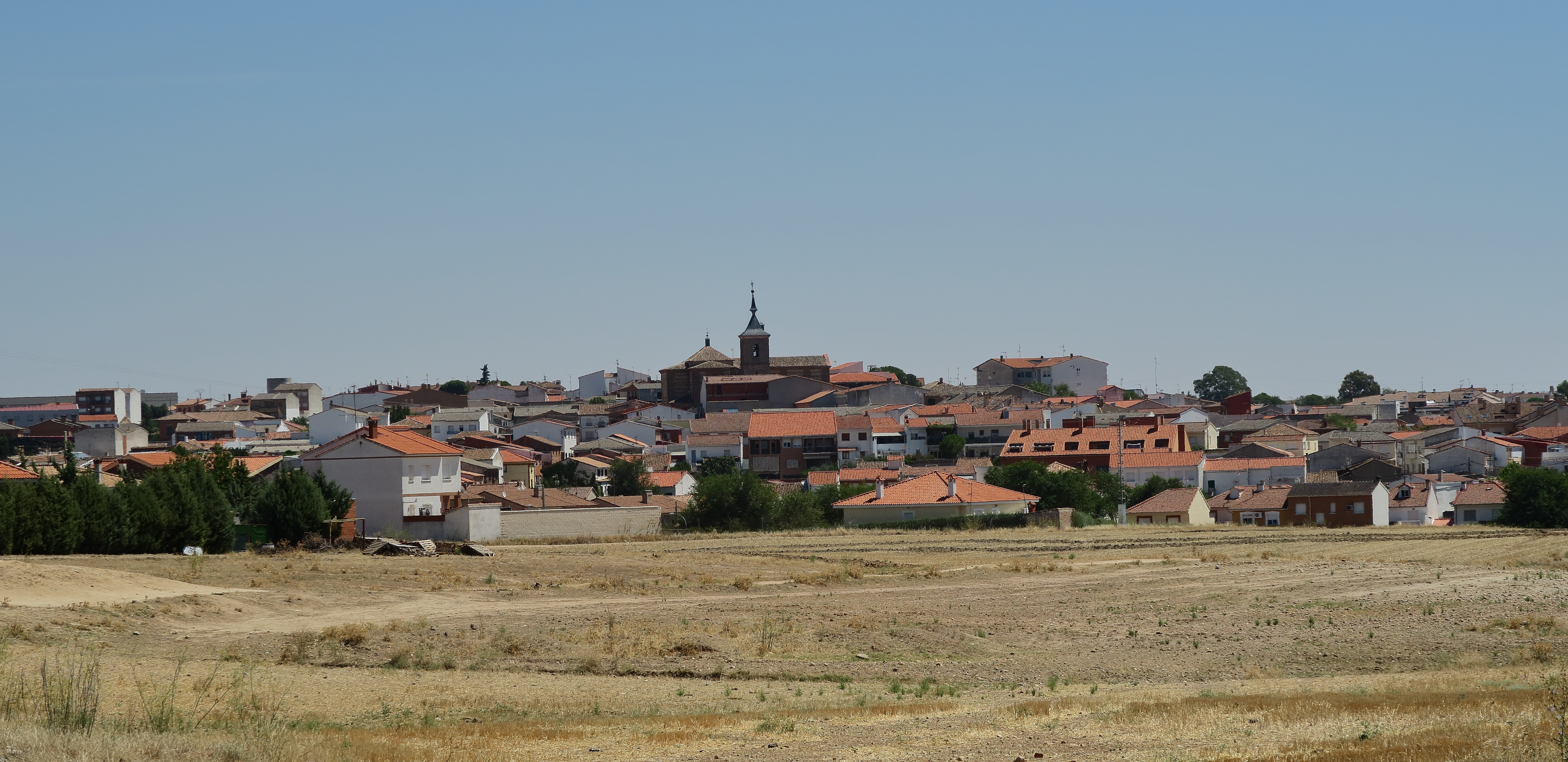
- Panoramic view of Santa Cruz del Retamar.

- Flag Coat of arms
- Interactive map of Santa Cruz del Retamar
- Country: Spain
- Autonomous community: Castile-La Mancha
- Province: Toledo
- Municipality: Santa Cruz del Retamar

Area
  - Total: 130 km^{2} (50 sq mi)
- Elevation: 603 m (1,978 ft)

Population (2025-01-01)
  - Total: 4,194
  - Density: 32/km^{2} (84/sq mi)
- Time zone: UTC+1 (CET)
  - Summer (DST): UTC+2 (CEST)

Santa Cruz del Retamar is a municipality located in the province of Toledo, Castile-La Mancha, Spain. According to the 2006 census (INE), the municipality has a population of 2555 inhabitants.

== Demographics ==
Historical population
| Year | Pop. | ±% |
|---|---|---|
| 1900 | 2,124 | — |
| 1910 | 2,481 | +16.8% |
| 1920 | 2,479 | −0.1% |
| 1930 | 2,555 | +3.1% |
| 1940 | 1,867 | −26.9% |
| 1950 | 2,118 | +13.4% |
| 1960 | 2,049 | −3.3% |
| 1970 | 1,548 | −24.5% |
| 1981 | 1,156 | −25.3% |
| 1991 | 1,444 | +24.9% |
| 2001 | 1,752 | +21.3% |
| 2011 | 3,065 | +74.9% |
| 2021 | 3,554 | +16.0% |
| 2023 | 3,901 | +9.8% |
Source: INE
