= Villamiel de Toledo =

- Municipality
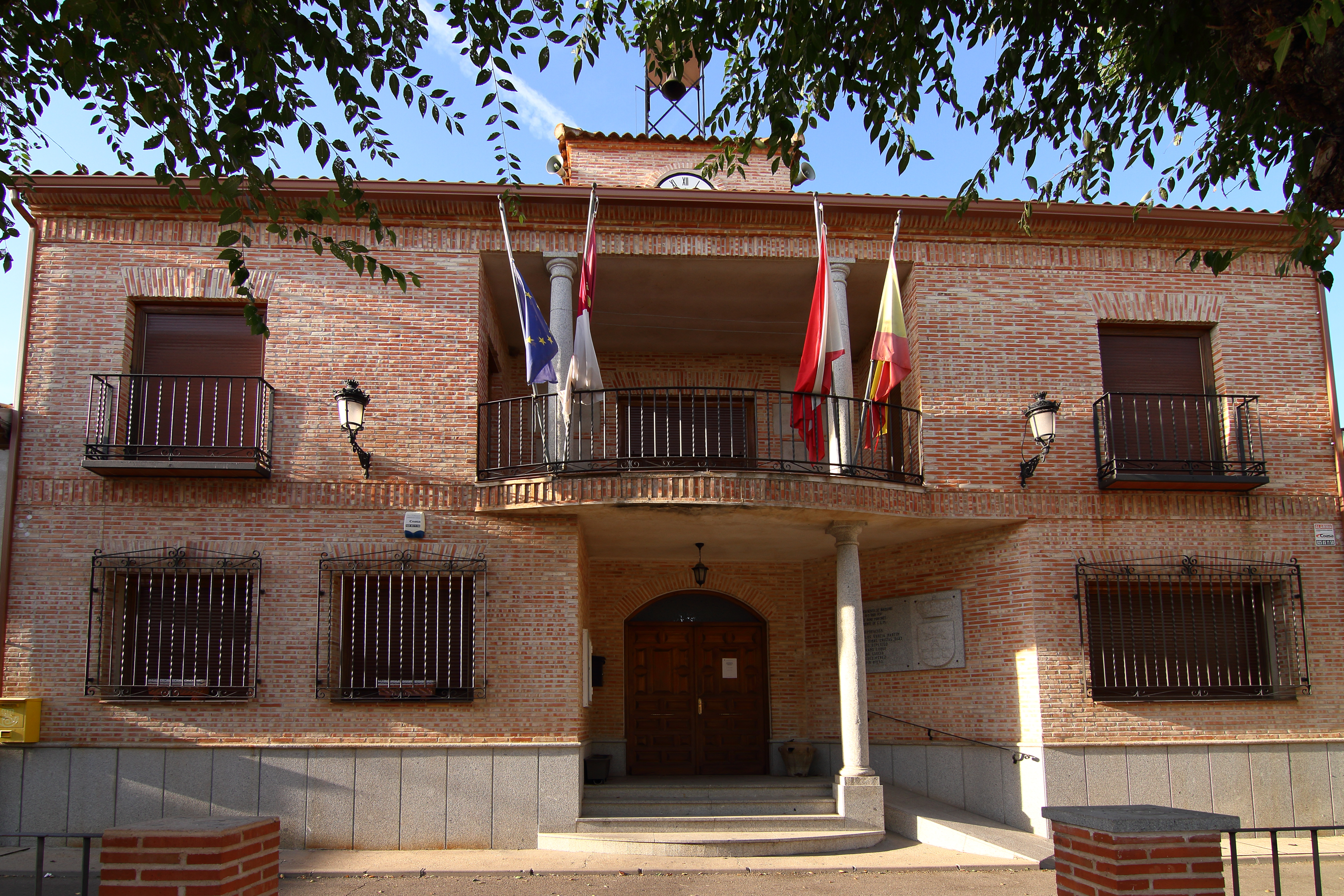
- Town hall

- Flag Coat of arms

- Location in Spain
- Coordinates: 39°58′N 4°08′W
- Country: Spain
- Autonomous community: Castile-La Mancha
- Province: Toledo
- Municipality: Villamiel de Toledo

Area
  - Total: 42 km^{2} (16 sq mi)
- Elevation: 485 m (1,591 ft)

Population (2025-01-01)
  - Total: 1,097
  - Density: 26/km^{2} (68/sq mi)
- Time zone: UTC+1 (CET)
  - Summer (DST): UTC+2 (CEST)

Villamiel de Toledo is a municipality located in the province of Toledo, Castile-La Mancha, Spain. According to the 2006 census (INE), the municipality has a population of 753 inhabitants.
