= Azután =

Azután, Spain
- Coat of arms

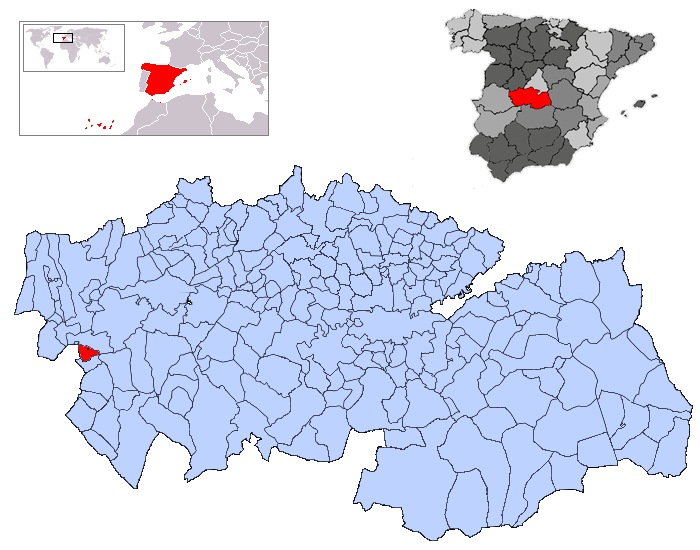
- Location in the province of Toledo

- Location in Spain
- Coordinates: 39°47′05″N 5°07′37″W
- Country: Spain
- Autonomous community: Castile-La Mancha
- Province: Toledo
- Municipality: Azután

Area
  - Total: 22 km^{2} (8.5 sq mi)
- Elevation: 229 m (751 ft)

Population (2025-01-01)
  - Total: 286
  - Density: 13/km^{2} (34/sq mi)
- Time zone: UTC+1 (CET)
  - Summer (DST): UTC+2 (CEST)

Azután is a municipality located in the province of Toledo, Castile-La Mancha, Spain. According to the 2006 census (INE), the municipality has a population of 305 inhabitants.

== Demographics ==
Historical population
Year	Pop.	±%
1900	427	—
1910	563	+31.9%
1920	565	+0.4%
1930	570	+0.9%
1940	593	+4.0%
1950	677	+14.2%
1960	588	−13.1%
1970	477	−18.9%
1981	403	−15.5%
1991	368	−8.7%
2001	342	−7.1%
2011	298	−12.9%
2021	303	+1.7%
2023	292	−3.6%
Source: INE
