= Carmena =

- municipality
- Flag Coat of arms

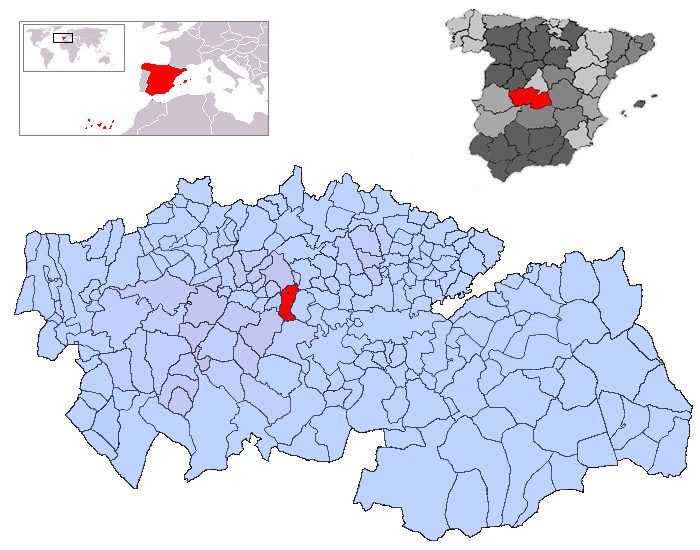
- Coordinates: 39°57′N 4°24′W
- Country: Spain
- Autonomous community: Castile-La Mancha
- Province: Toledo
- Municipality: Carmena

Area
  - Total: 47 km^{2} (18 sq mi)
- Elevation: 562 m (1,844 ft)

Population (2025-01-01)
  - Total: 771
  - Density: 16/km^{2} (42/sq mi)
- Time zone: UTC+1 (CET)
  - Summer (DST): UTC+2 (CEST)

Carmena is a municipality located in the province of Toledo, Castile-La Mancha, Spain. According to the 2006 census (INE), the municipality has a population of 860 inhabitants.

== Demographics ==
Historical population
Year	Pop.	±%
1900	1,689	—
1910	1,873	+10.9%
1920	1,989	+6.2%
1930	2,000	+0.6%
1940	1,723	−13.8%
1950	1,811	+5.1%
1960	1,432	−20.9%
1970	1,154	−19.4%
1981	846	−26.7%
1991	800	−5.4%
2001	817	+2.1%
2011	845	+3.4%
2021	780	−7.7%
2023	848	+8.7%
Source: INE
