= Erustes =

Coordinates: 39°57′N 4°30′W

- municipality
- Flag Coat of arms

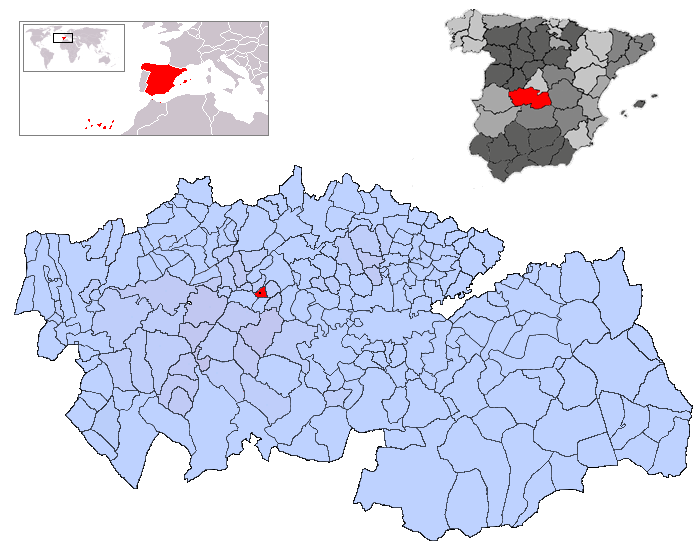
- Country: Spain
- Autonomous community: Castile-La Mancha
- Province: Toledo
- Municipality: Erustes

Area
  - Total: 10 km^{2} (3.9 sq mi)
- Elevation: 531 m (1,742 ft)

Population (2025-01-01)
  - Total: 220
  - Density: 22/km^{2} (57/sq mi)
- Time zone: UTC+1 (CET)
  - Summer (DST): UTC+2 (CEST)

Erustes is a municipality located in the province of Toledo, Castile-La Mancha, Spain. According to the 2006 census (INE), the municipality has a population of 209 inhabitants.
