= Escalonilla =

Coordinates: 39.926°N 4.349°W

- municipality
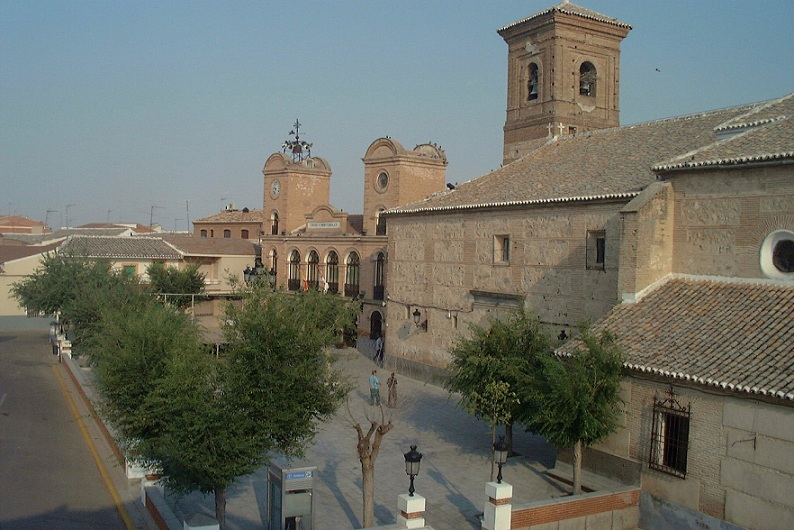
- View of Escalonilla

- Coat of arms
- Interactive map of Escalonilla
- Country: Spain
- Autonomous community: Castile-La Mancha
- Province: Toledo
- Municipality: Escalonilla

Area
  - Total: 50.95 km^{2} (19.67 sq mi)
- Elevation: 545 m (1,788 ft)

Population (2025-01-01)
  - Total: 1,545
  - Density: 30.32/km^{2} (78.54/sq mi)
- Time zone: UTC+1 (CET)
  - Summer (DST): UTC+2 (CEST)

Escalonilla is a municipality located in the province of Toledo, Castile-La Mancha, Spain. According to the 2006 census (INE), the municipality has a population of 1505 inhabitants.
