= Marrupe =

Coordinates: 40°5′19.56″N 4°47′42.47″W

- municipality
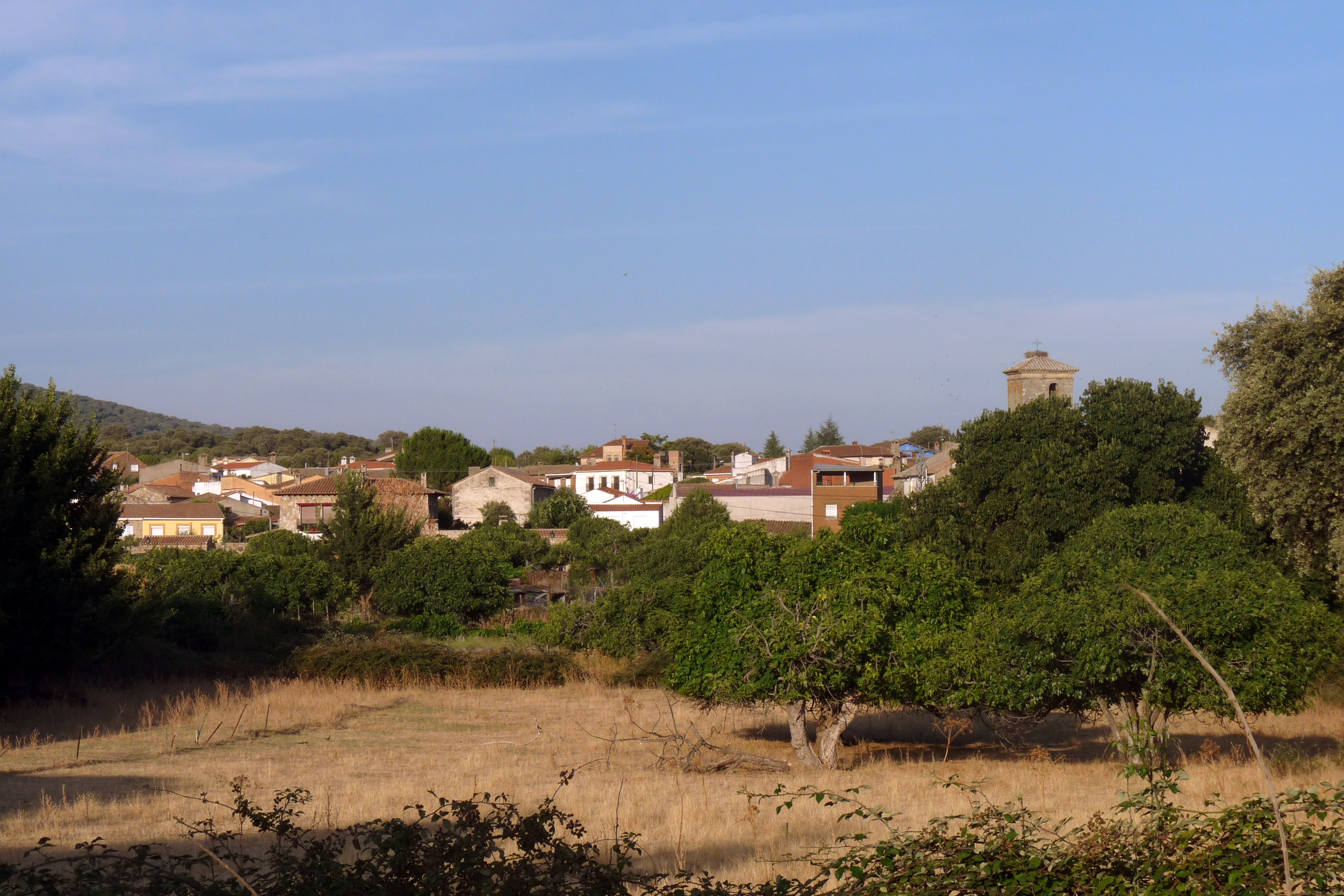
- View of Marrupe from the west

- Flag Coat of arms
- Interactive map of Marrupe
- Country: Spain
- Autonomous community: Castile-La Mancha
- Province: Toledo
- Municipality: Marrupe

Area
  - Total: 10 km^{2} (3.9 sq mi)
- Elevation: 584 m (1,916 ft)

Population (2025-01-01)
  - Total: 166
  - Density: 17/km^{2} (43/sq mi)
- Time zone: UTC+1 (CET)
  - Summer (DST): UTC+2 (CEST)

Marrupe is a municipality located in the province of Toledo, Castile-La Mancha, Spain. According to the 2006 census (INE), the municipality has a population of 155 inhabitants.
