= Cardiel de los Montes =

Coordinates: 40°04′N 4°39′W

- municipality
- Flag Coat of arms

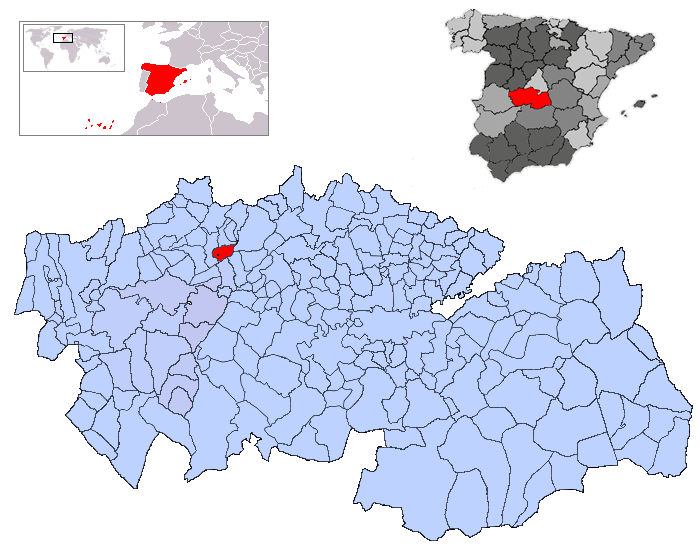
- Country: Spain
- Autonomous community: Castile-La Mancha
- Province: Toledo
- Municipality: Cardiel de los Montes

Area
  - Total: 24 km^{2} (9.3 sq mi)
- Elevation: 402 m (1,319 ft)

Population (2025-01-01)
  - Total: 406
  - Density: 17/km^{2} (44/sq mi)
- Time zone: UTC+1 (CET)
  - Summer (DST): UTC+2 (CEST)

Cardiel de los Montes is a municipality located in the province of Toledo, Castile-La Mancha, Spain. According to the 2006 census (INE), the municipality has a population of 256 inhabitants.

== Demographics ==
Historical population
Year	Pop.	±%
1900	228	—
1910	262	+14.9%
1920	271	+3.4%
1930	305	+12.5%
1940	313	+2.6%
1950	340	+8.6%
1960	334	−1.8%
1970	149	−55.4%
1981	144	−3.4%
1991	152	+5.6%
2001	163	+7.2%
2011	385	+136.2%
2021	380	−1.3%
2023	398	+4.7%
Source: INE
