= Huecas =

Coordinates: 40°01′N 4°11′W

- municipality
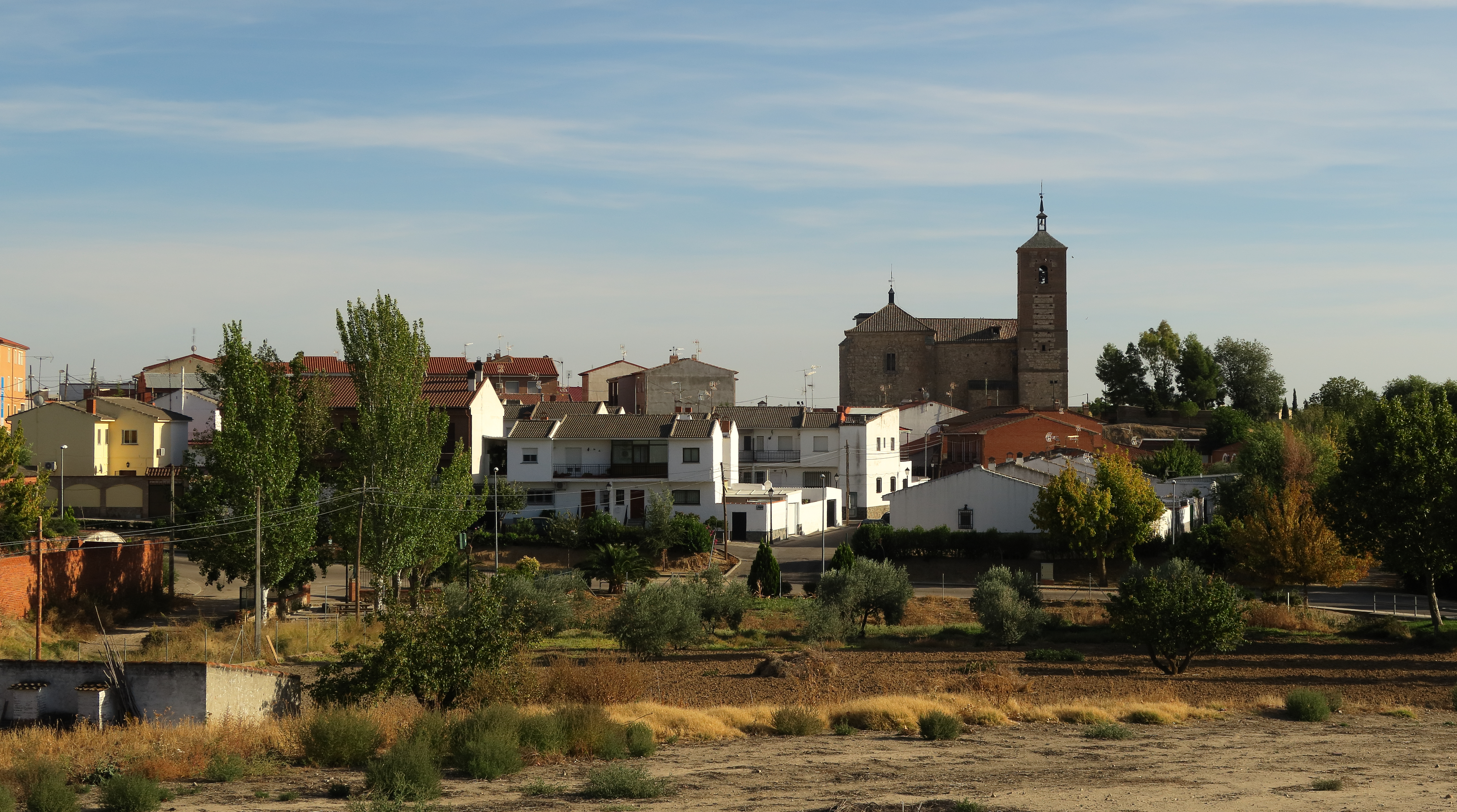
- View of Huecas

- Flag Coat of arms
- Interactive map of Huecas
- Country: Spain
- Autonomous community: Castile-La Mancha
- Province: Toledo
- Municipality: Huecas

Area
  - Total: 27 km^{2} (10 sq mi)
- Elevation: 555 m (1,821 ft)

Population (2025-01-01)
  - Total: 890
  - Density: 33/km^{2} (85/sq mi)
- Time zone: UTC+1 (CET)
  - Summer (DST): UTC+2 (CEST)

Huecas is a municipality located in the province of Toledo, Castile-La Mancha, Spain. According to the 2006 census (INE), the municipality has a population of 506 inhabitants.
