= La Iglesuela del Tiétar =

Coordinates: 40.233°N 4.749°W

La Iglesuela
- municipality
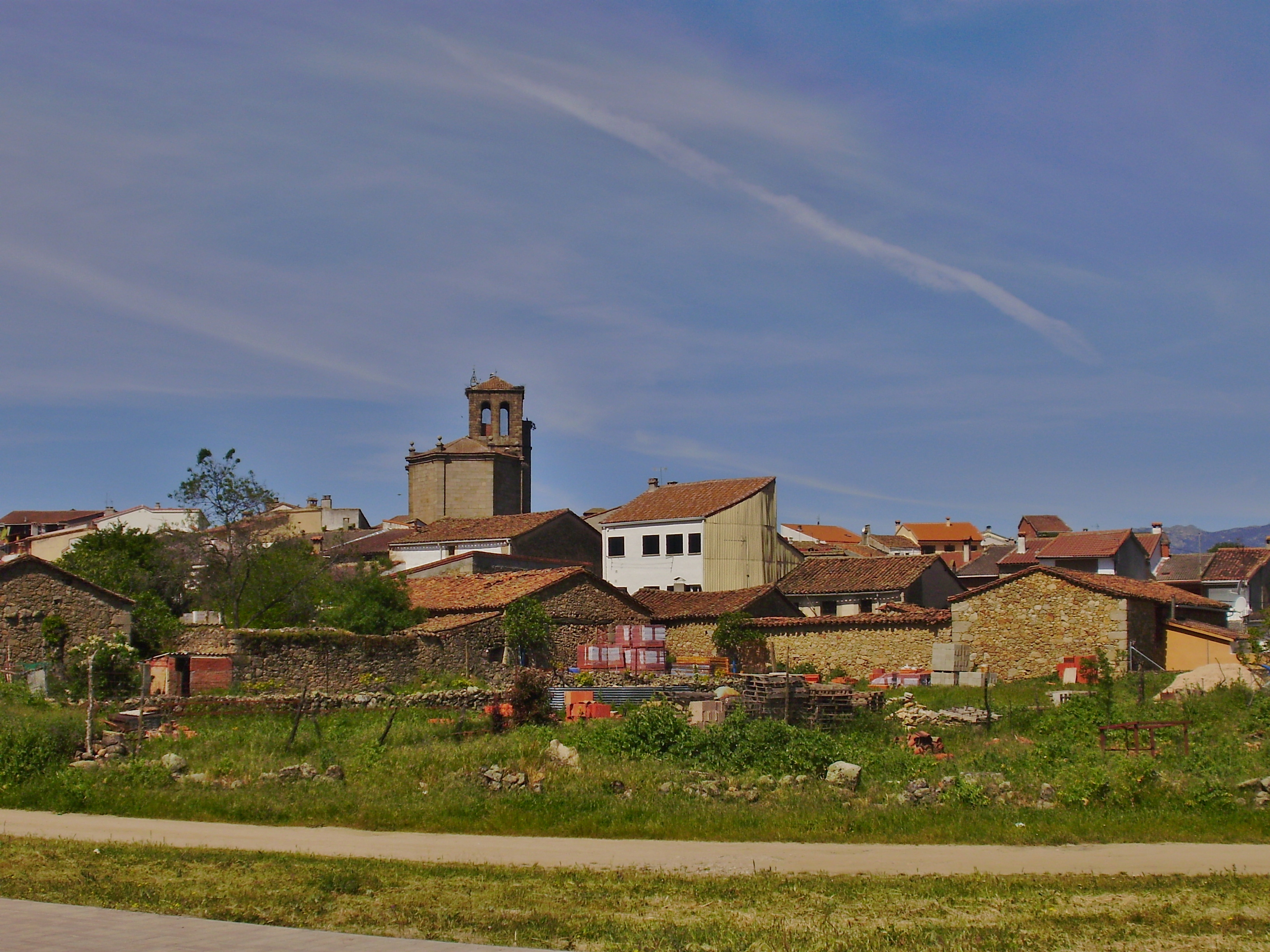

- Flag Coat of arms
- Interactive map of La Iglesuela
- Country: Spain
- Autonomous community: Castile-La Mancha
- Province: Toledo
- Municipality: La Iglesuela

Area
  - Total: 69 km^{2} (27 sq mi)
- Elevation: 521 m (1,709 ft)

Population (2025-01-01)
  - Total: 448
  - Density: 6.5/km^{2} (17/sq mi)
- Time zone: UTC+1 (CET)
  - Summer (DST): UTC+2 (CEST)

La Iglesuela is a municipality located in the province of Toledo, Castile-La Mancha, Spain. According to the 2006 census (INE), the municipality has a population of 411 inhabitants.
