= Pelahustán =

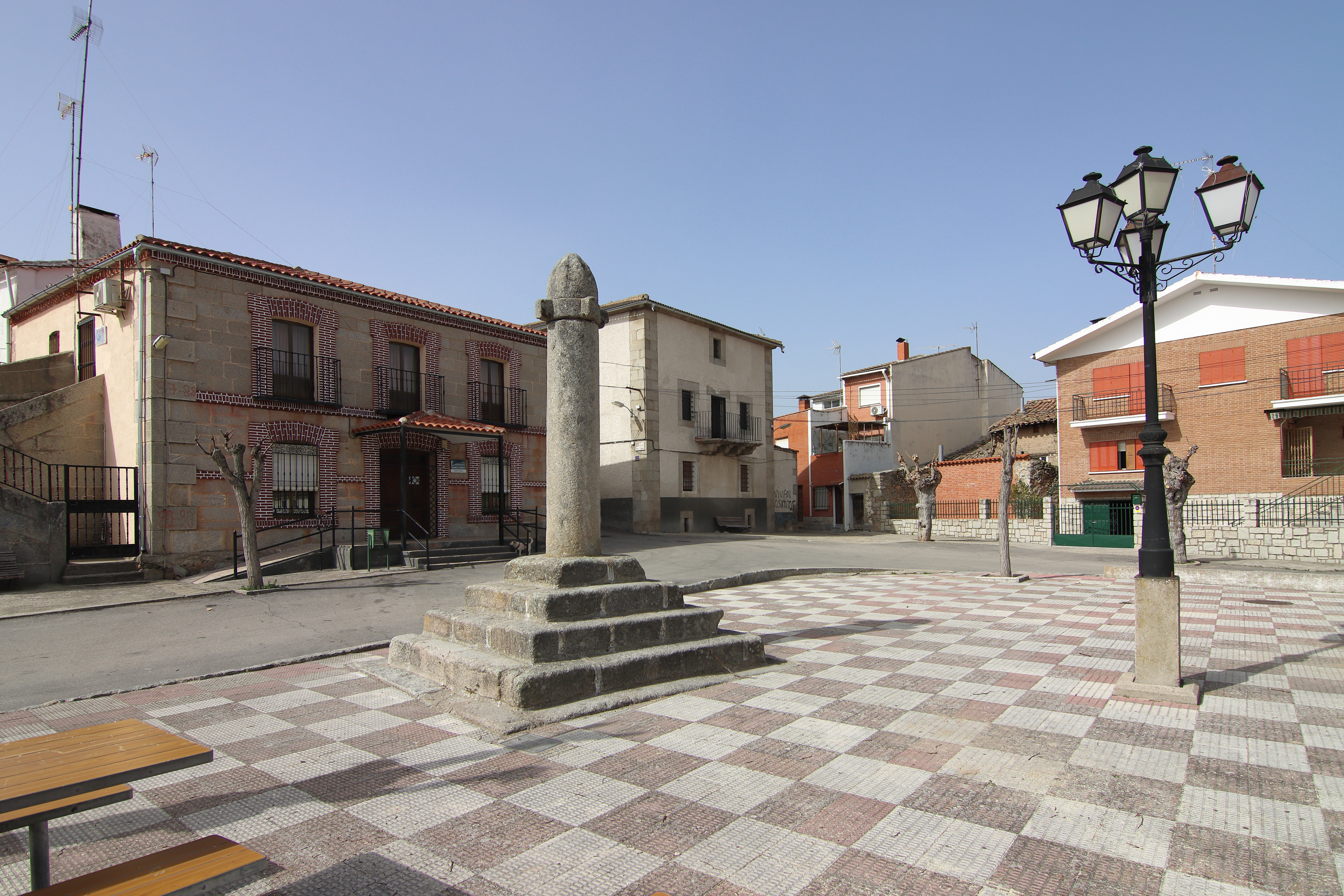

- Flag Coat of arms

- Location in Spain Pelahustán (Spain)
- Coordinates: 40°11′N 4°36′W
- Country: Spain
- Autonomous community: Castile-La Mancha
- Province: Toledo
- Municipality: Pelahustán

Area
  - Total: 44 km^{2} (17 sq mi)
- Elevation: 677 m (2,221 ft)

Population (2025-01-01)
  - Total: 335
  - Density: 7.6/km^{2} (20/sq mi)
- Time zone: UTC+1 (CET)
  - Summer (DST): UTC+2 (CEST)

Pelahustán is a municipality located in the province of Toledo, Castile-La Mancha, Spain. According to the 2014 census, the municipality has a population of 349 inhabitants. It yearly organises a bike concentration, revientamuelles, since 2005.
