= Aldea en Cabo =

Coordinates: 40.186°N 4.455°W

- municipality
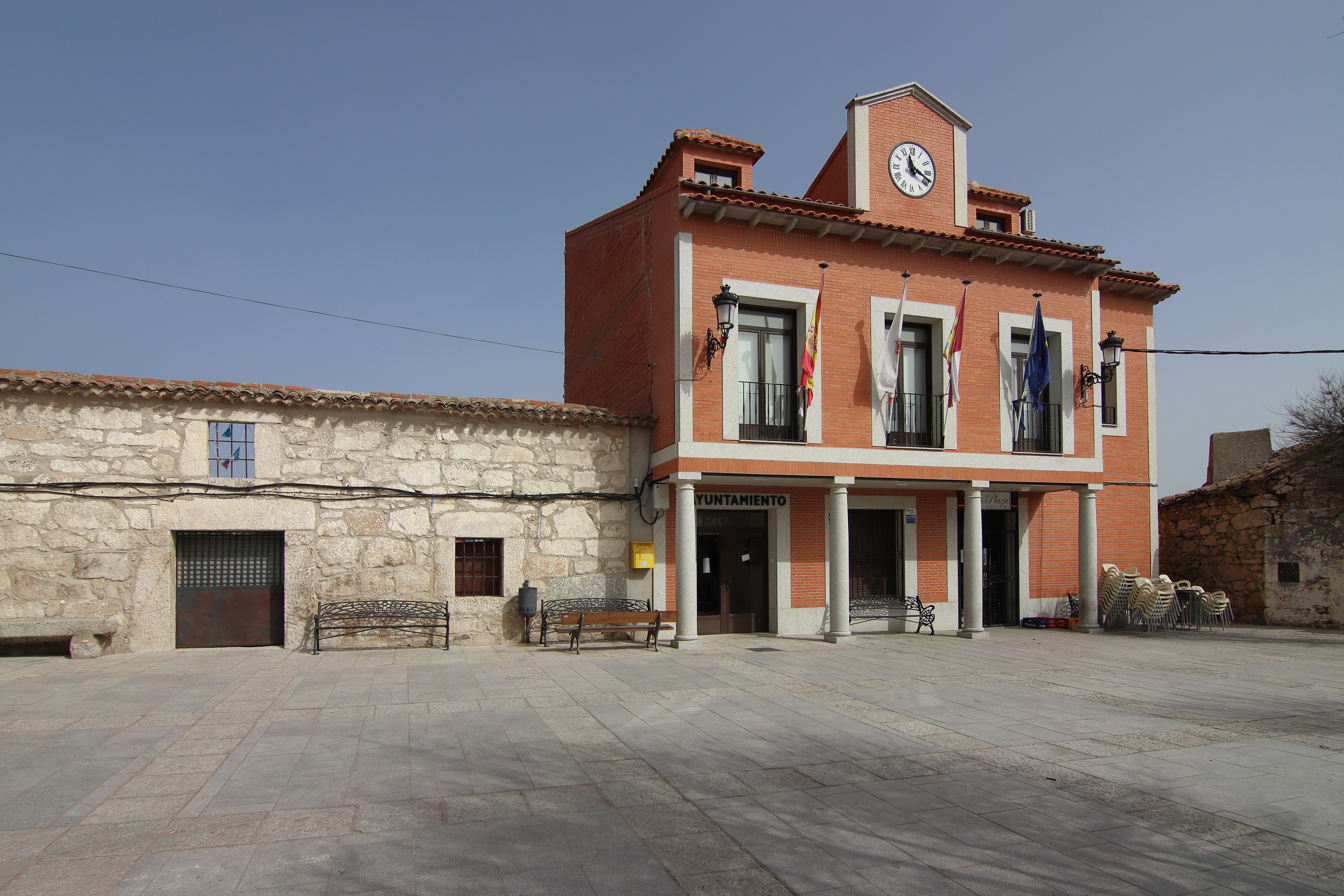
- Town Hall of Aldea en Cabo

- Flag Coat of arms
- Interactive map of Aldea en Cabo
- Country: Spain
- Autonomous community: Castile-La Mancha
- Province: Toledo
- Municipality: Aldea en Cabo

Area
  - Total: 26 km^{2} (10 sq mi)
- Elevation: 509 m (1,670 ft)

Population (2025-01-01)
  - Total: 184
  - Density: 7.1/km^{2} (18/sq mi)
- Time zone: UTC+1 (CET)
  - Summer (DST): UTC+2 (CEST)

Aldea en Cabo is a municipality located in the province of Toledo, Castile-La Mancha, Spain. According to the 2006 census (INE), the municipality has a population of 206 inhabitants.

== Demographics ==
Historical population
Year	Pop.	±%
1900	702	—
1910	732	+4.3%
1920	812	+10.9%
1930	815	+0.4%
1940	690	−15.3%
1950	745	+8.0%
1960	576	−22.7%
1970	340	−41.0%
1981	230	−32.4%
1991	193	−16.1%
2001	170	−11.9%
2011	228	+34.1%
2021	179	−21.5%
2023	204	+14.0%
Source:INE
