= Albarreal de Tajo =

- Municipality
- Flag Coat of arms

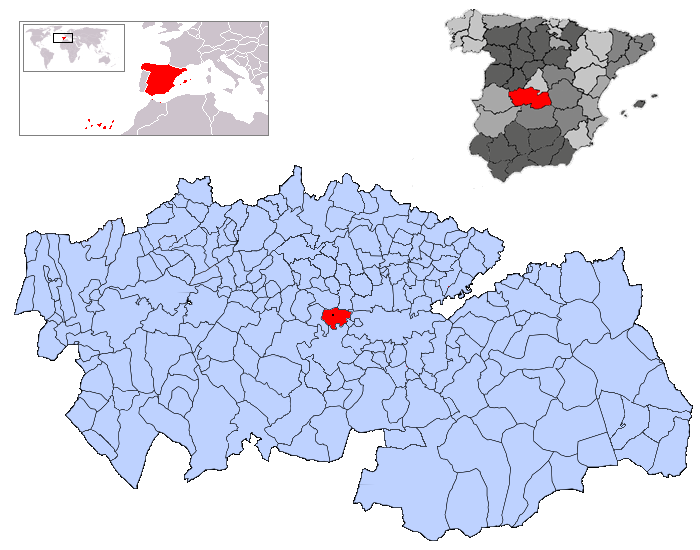

- Location in Spain
- Coordinates: 39°53′48″N 4°13′42″W
- Country: Spain
- Autonomous community: Castile-La Mancha
- Province: Toledo
- Comarca: Torrijos
- Judicial district: Torrijos
- Founded: Ver texto

Government
  - Alcalde: Pedro Lobato Ferrero (2007)

Area
  - Total: 41.58 km^{2} (16.05 sq mi)
- Elevation: 452 m (1,483 ft)

Population (2025-01-01)
  - Total: 804
  - Density: 19.3/km^{2} (50.1/sq mi)
- Demonyms: Albarreano, na
- Time zone: UTC+1 (CET)
  - Summer (DST): UTC+2 (CEST)
- Postal code: 45240
- Dialing code: 925

Albarreal de Tajo is a municipality located in the province of Toledo, Castile-La Mancha, Spain. According to the 2008 census (INE), the municipality had a population of 709 inhabitants.

== Toponymy ==
The root "alba" is probably derived from the Celtic roots albiga and albiganus. The municipality was formerly known as Albala, which is Arabic signifies "the sewer." During the 11th century, it was called Albalat, signifying in Arabic "the walk" or "the path," and by the 16th century it was known as Albarreal o Alcalá del Río.

During the 17th century, after receiving the title of Villa, the municipality changed its name to Alba Real. The local nobility still use this title, and the lord is known as the Count of Alba Real.

== Demographics ==
Historical population
Year	Pop.	±%
1900	392	—
1910	451	+15.1%
1920	539	+19.5%
1930	639	+18.6%
1940	596	−6.7%
1950	731	+22.7%
1960	781	+6.8%
1970	663	−15.1%
1981	514	−22.5%
1991	558	+8.6%
2001	630	+12.9%
2011	742	+17.8%
2021	708	−4.6%
2023	735	+3.8%
Source: INE
