= Montes de Toledo Comarca =

Coordinates: 39°38′N 4°29′W

Montes de Toledo Comarca Comarca de los Montes de Toledo
- Comarca
- Location of the Montes de Toledo Comarca in Toledo Province
- Country: Spain
- Autonomous community: Castile-La Mancha
- Province: Toledo
- Municipalities: List: See text

Area
  - Total: 3,018 km^{2} (1,165 sq mi)

Population
  - Total: 70,832
  - Density: 23.47/km^{2} (60.79/sq mi)
- Time zone: UTC+1 (CET)
  - Summer (DST): UTC+2 (CEST)
- Largest municipality: Los Yébenes

Montes de Toledo Comarca (Spanish: Comarca de los Montes de Toledo) is a comarca located at the southern end of the province of Toledo, Spain. The natural comarca includes some municipal terms in Ciudad Real Province.

It is named after the Montes de Toledo mountain system. and, like other mountainous rural areas in central Spain, this comarca has been traditionally a place of cattle rearers, with some honey production as well. Nowadays the comarca has suffered heavy depopulation as the economy has diversified.

== Municipal terms and villages ==
Town	Population	Surface	Density
Sonseca	11.178	59,56	179,41
Los Yébenes	6.434	677,46	9,36
Argés	5.178	23,74	181,48
Navahermosa	4.310	129,79	32,43
Polán	3.937	158,70	23,68
Gálvez	3.476	55,00	61,51
Cobisa	3.645	14,48	221,45
Nambroca	3.415	82,02	36,17
Menasalbas	3.344	179,44	17,87
Urda	3.166	217,82	14,53
Orgaz	2.838	154,48	17,68
Burguillos de Toledo	2.399	28,49	69,96
Ajofrín	2.328	35,10	64,92
San Pablo de los Montes	2.271	100,05	22,81
Guadamur	1.819	38,23	46,41
Pulgar	1.653	38,60	37,82
Cuerva	1.571	37,51	37,88
Las Ventas con Peña Aguilera	1.355	140,09	9,64
Mazarambroz	1.349	216,02	6,08
Noez	967	34,22	28,26
Almonacid de Toledo	903	95,78	8,49
San Martín de Montalbán	794	133,03	5,62
Villaminaya	608	21,28	27,54
Mascaraque	533	65,61	7,55
Manzaneque	472	12,22	37,23
Layos	444	18,39	20,55
Totanés	438	26,04	16,01
Marjaliza	321	65,80	4,59
Chueca	253	11,12	22,93
Casasbuenas	241	30,46	7,62
Hontanar	159	151,77	0,87

=== Municipal terms in Ciudad Real Province ===
- Alcoba
- Arroba de los Montes
- El Robledo
- Fontanarejo
- Fuente el Fresno
- Las Labores
- Los Cortijos
- Navalpino
- Navas de Estena
- Porzuna
- Puebla de Don Rodrigo
- Retuerta del Bullaque
