= Gálvez (Vino de la Tierra) =

Gálvez was a Spanish geographical indication for Vino de la Tierra wines located in the autonomous region of Castilla–La Mancha. Vino de la Tierra is one step below the mainstream Denominación de Origen indication on the Spanish wine quality ladder.

The area covered by this geographical indication comprises the municipalities of Cuerva, Gálvez, Guadamur, Menasalbas, Mazarambroz, Polán, Pulgar, San Martín de Montalbán and Totanés, located in the province of Toledo, in Castilla–La Mancha, Spain.

It acquired its Vino de la Tierra status in 1988, but it is no longer listed.
