= Ajofrín =

- Municipality
- Flag Coat of arms

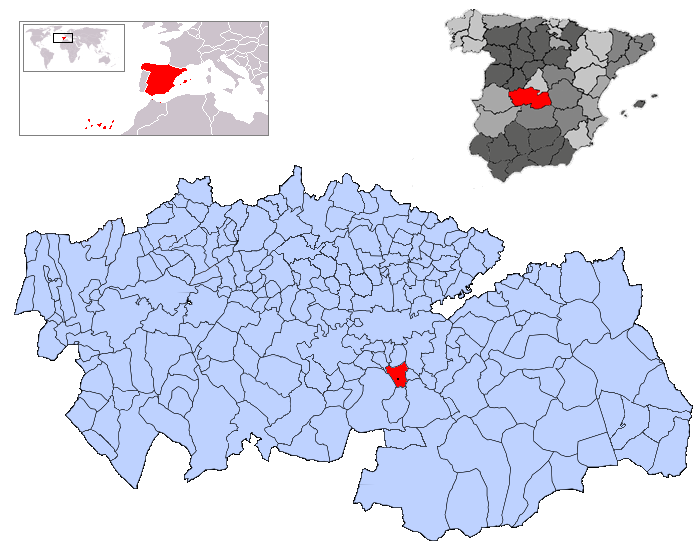

- Location in Spain
- Coordinates: 39°42′49″N 3°58′55″W
- Country: Spain
- Autonomous community: Castile-La Mancha
- Province: Toledo
- Comarca: Montes de Toledo
- Judicial district: Orgaz
- Founded: Ver texto

Government
  - Alcalde: Pedro Alguacil Ruiz (2007)

Area
  - Total: 35.1 km^{2} (13.6 sq mi)
- Elevation: 770 m (2,530 ft)

Population (2025-01-01)
  - Total: 2,379
  - Density: 67.8/km^{2} (176/sq mi)
- Demonyms: Ajofrinero, ra o Ajofrineño, ña
- Time zone: UTC+1 (CET)
  - Summer (DST): UTC+2 (CEST)
- Postal code: 45110
- Dialing code: 925

Ajofrín is a municipality located in the province of Toledo, Castile-La Mancha, Spain. As of 2025, it is home to 2379 inhabitants according to the National Statistics Institute of Spain (INE). Its name derives from the Arabic Al-Ya'rar, or "the place of the Yafar or Jafar".

== History ==
Ancient Roman ruins indicate a continuous settlement since the Roman Empire. During the 15th century, the municipality was under the control of the Church of Toledo, and was at that point in history called a villa. The local copper mine, whose meager production supported the town's growth during the Renaissance, was abandoned during the mid-18th century.

On 2024, a bathhouse of Mudéjar influence built in the 13th-14th centuries was found integrated into a house in the city center.

== Geography ==
The municipality is located on a granite mesa in the northernmost reaches of the Montes de Toledo. It shares borders with the municipalities of Burguillos de Toledo, Nambroca, Chueca, Sonseca, Mazarambroz, and Layos.

The Diputación de Toledo currently includes Ajofrín in the Comarca of Montes de Toledo, despite traditionally being part of La Sisla.

== Industry ==
The primary industry of the area is agriculture. 60% of the territory of Ajofrín is cultivated, with 55% as vineyards, and the rest growing sugarbeets, olives, and cereal grains.
