= Orgaz =

- municipality
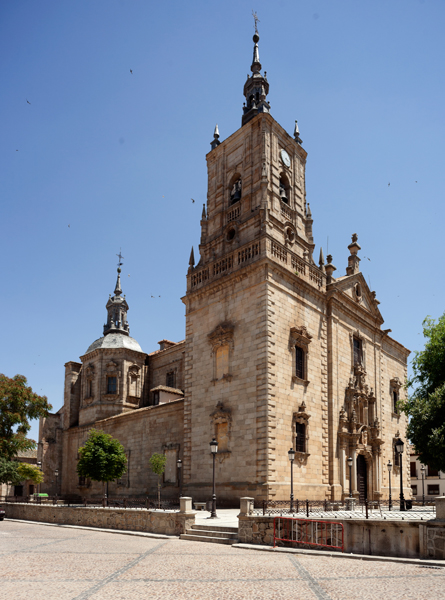
- Church of St Thomas the Apostle

- Flag Coat of arms
- Interactive map of Orgaz
- Coordinates: 39°38′48″N 3°52′38″W
- Country: Spain
- Autonomous Community: Castile-La Mancha
- Province: Toledo
- Comarca: Montes de Toledo
- Municipality: Orgaz

Area
  - Total: 154 km^{2} (59 sq mi)
- Elevation: 744 m (2,441 ft)

Population (2025-01-01)
  - Total: 2,639
  - Density: 17.1/km^{2} (44.4/sq mi)
- Time zone: UTC+1 (CET)
  - Summer (DST): UTC+2 (CEST)

Orgaz is a municipality located in the province of Toledo, Castile-La Mancha, Spain. According to the 2024 census, the municipality had a population of 2595 inhabitants, but it has since declined.

== Toponymy ==
There are several proposed etymologies for the name "Orgaz", but none are definitively confirmed. According to Jiménez de Gregorio, one possible meaning is "fertile" or "abundant", derived from the Celtic root olca-, meaning "fertile field". Meanwhile, Albaigés suggests a Basque origin, linking the name to a variant of orbaiz, ormaitz or urbiz, meaning "strawberry tree grove". Other theories point to a pre-Roman root such as orc- or urc-, or even the Celtic worg-, to which the Basque-derived suffix -az might have been added. In some medieval documents, the town is referred to as "Orgas".

== Geography ==
The municipality of Orgaz is located in the province of Toledo, within the autonomous community of Castilla-La Mancha, approximately 30 km (19 mi) south of the provincial capital, Toledo, and about 100 km (62 mi) from Madrid. It borders the municipalities of Chueca and Villaminaya to the north, Mascaraque, Mora and Manzaneque to the east, Los Yébenes and Marjaliza to the south, and Mazarambroz, Sonseca and Ajofrín to the west, all within the province of Toledo.

The municipality covers an area of 152.73 km² (59 sq mi), and lies at an average altitude of approximately 744 metres (2,441 feet) above sea level. While the northern part of Orgaz lies within the relatively flat terrain of the southern sub-plateau of the Iberian Meseta, the southern area, near the border with Los Yébenes and Marjaliza, is marked by the Sierra de Yébenes, which reaches elevations of up to 1,121 metres (3,678 feet).

Orgaz is part of the comarca of Montes de Toledo, whose capital is Los Yébenes. Historically, geographically, and culturally, it also belongs to the region known as La Sisla.

The municipality consists of two population centres: the main town of Orgaz, and the smaller village of Arisgotas, located to the southwest of the municipality. Arisgotas was an independent municipality until 1857 and currently has a population of 47 inhabitants.

== History ==
This village may have been the ancient Barnices mentioned by Ptolemy in Carpetania. It belonged to the County of Orgaz—a title said to have been granted to El Cid (Rodrigo Díaz de Vivar) upon his marriage to Jimena Díaz in Burgos. The first recorded mention of the port of Orgaz, “de portugue de Orgaz”, appears in an agreement dated 1183 between the Archbishop of Toledo, Gonzalo Pérez, and the Master of the Order of Calatrava, Nuño Pérez de Quiñones. During the reign of Ferdinand III, it fell under the jurisdiction of Toledo.

In 1239 (though some sources indicate 1240), Álvaro Pérez de Castro died in Orgaz while travelling to Andalusia after meeting Ferdinand III in Ayllón. Álvaro Pérez de Castro was lord of the House of Castro, son of Pedro Fernández de Castro, and great‑grandson of Alfonso VII, King of León. He defeated the emir Ibn Hud at the Battle of Jerez in 1231 and played a key role in the conquest of Córdoba, which capitulated to Ferdinand III in 1236.

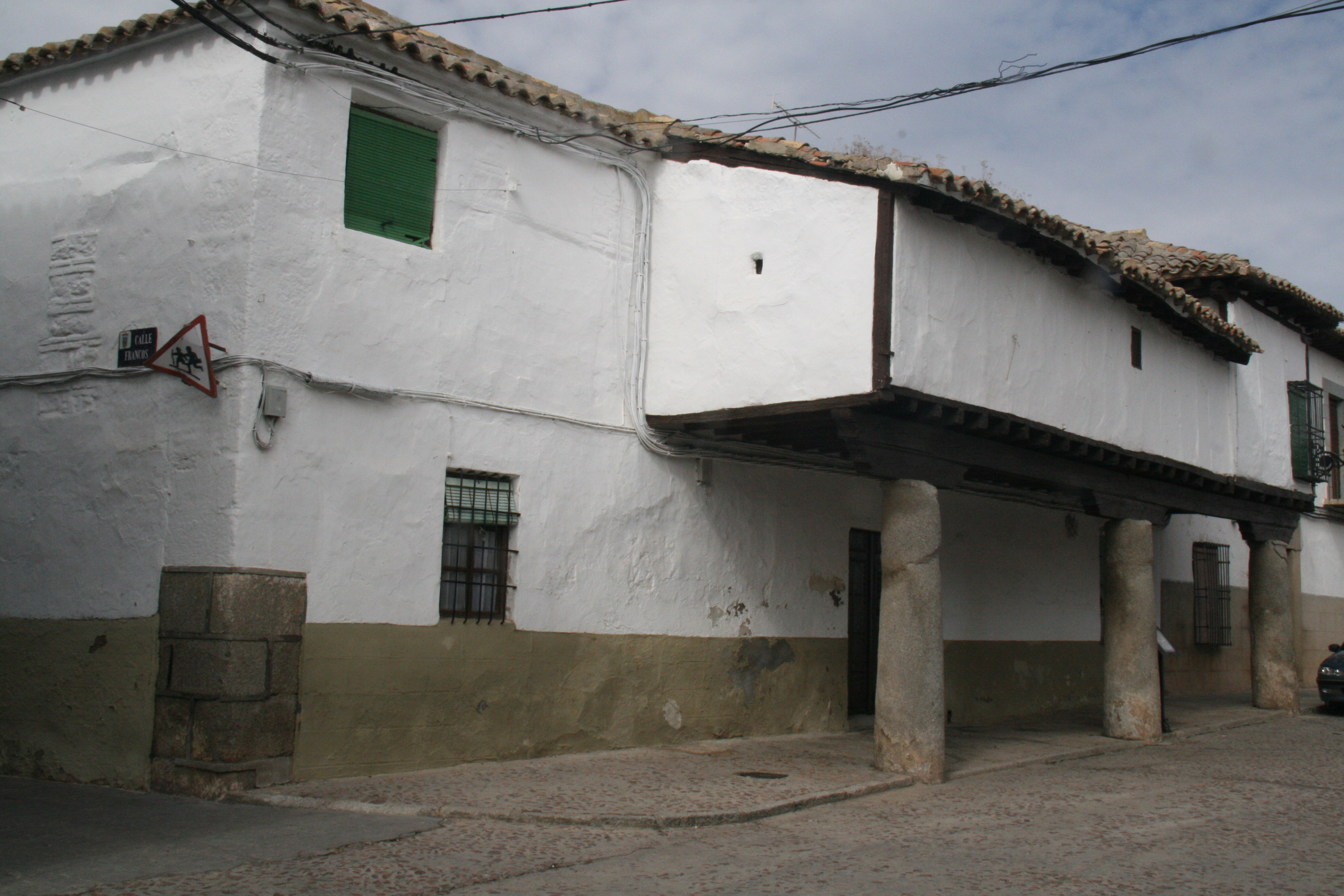
Hospital of San Lorenzo in Orgaz

In 1344, Peter I granted Orgaz to his tutor Martín Fernández, and later, Charles V elevated it to a county and donated it to Álvaro Pérez de Guzmán. Prior to the Battle of Montiel, the army of Henry II encamped within its municipal boundaries; the land where his tent stood was thereafter exempted from tithes and became known as the “haza sin diezmos”.

On 26 March 1813, during the Peninsular War, the Action of Orgaz took place near the village, when two companies of Volunteers of Catalonia and a squadron of the Cazadores de Ubrique cavalry were attacked by French horsemen.

== Administration ==
=== Mayors ===
Period	Name	Party
1979–1983	Enrique Cano Torres	UCD
1983–1987	Manuel Romero-Salazar García-Aranda	AP/PDP/UL
1987–1991	Manuel Romero-Salazar García-Aranda (until 16 January 1989) Emiliano Peces Carbonell	PP
1991–1995	Lucas Sánchez Calvo	PSOE
1995–1999	Manuel Romero-Salazar García-Aranda	PP
1999–2003	Lucas Sánchez Calvo	PSOE
2003–2007	Lucas Sánchez Calvo	PSOE
2007–2011	Tomás Villarrubia Lázaro	PSOE
2011–2015	Tomás Villarrubia Lázaro	PSOE
2015–2019	Tomás Villarrubia Lázaro	PSOE
2019–2023	Tomás Villarrubia Lázaro	PSOE
2023–present	Tomás Villarrubia Lázaro	PSOE

== Patrimony ==
- Castle of Orgaz: a fortress built in the late 14th century, located west of the town.
- Bridge of Five Eyes: a granite bridge built in the 18th century over the Riánsares stream, commissioned by Charles III of Spain for his hunting expeditions in Los Yébenes. It reflects the former volume of the stream and was restored in 2001 after losing its original granite paving.
- Church of Saint Thomas the Apostle: a Baroque-style parish church designed and built in the mid-18th century by architect Alberto de Churriguera, entirely funded by the townspeople.
- Hermitage of Socorro: a small chapel dedicated to the Virgin of Help, patron saint of Orgaz, situated north of the town on the road to Toledo.
- Hermitage of the Conception: located near the parish church, this building once had a Latin cross floor plan. Restoration work in 2002 uncovered its original granite slab floor.
- Plaza de Toros: built in the early 20th century, it was declared a Bien de Interés Cultural (Asset of Cultural Interest) in 2008 by the regional government of Castilla-La Mancha.

== Culture ==
=== Festivities ===
- 17 January: Feast of Saint Anthony the Abbot, celebrated with “luminarias” (street bonfires) on the eve, during which villagers gather to enjoy traditional migas.
- First weekend of February: Candlemas and Saint Blaise celebrations in the hamlet of Arisgotas.
- Tuesday before Ash Wednesday: pilgrimage (romería) to Villaverde.
- Third weekend of May: Spring Festival (Fiesta de Primavera), declared a Festival of Regional Tourist Interest in 2019.
- First or second weekend of July: feast of Saint Christopher.
- 24–27 August: patronal festivities in honour of the Most Holy Christ of Oblivion (Santísimo Cristo del Olvido), with 25 August as a local holiday.
- 8 September: patronal feast of the Virgin of Help.

== In art and popular culture ==
Orgaz is famously associated with the painting The Burial of the Count of Orgaz by El Greco, housed in the church of Santo Tomé in the city of Toledo. The work depicts the legendary burial of Don Gonzalo Ruiz, a nobleman from Toledo who was lord of the town of Orgaz in the 14th century. Although the painting is not physically located in Orgaz, it highlights the historical significance of the town and its nobility.

== See also ==
- Alberto de Churriguera
