= Pulgar =

- Municipality
- Flag Coat of arms

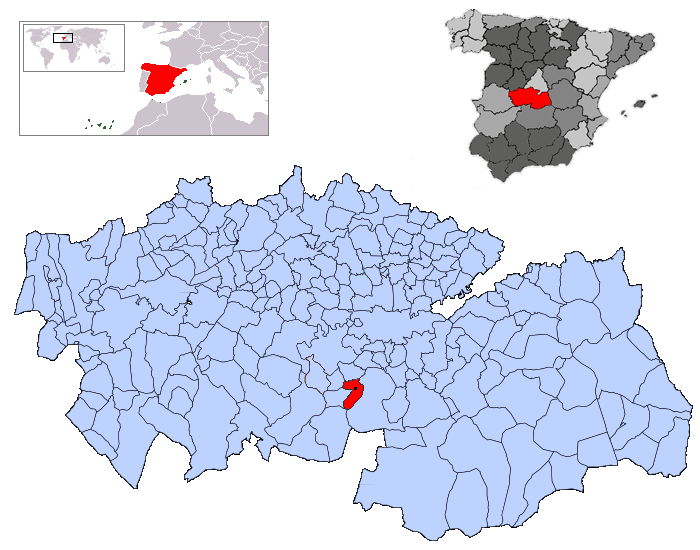
- Location of Pulgar in the Province of Toledo
- Coordinates: 39°41′41″N 4°9′8″W
- Country: Spain
- Autonomous community: Castile-La Mancha
- Province: Toledo
- Comarca: Montes de Toledo

Government
  - Alcalde: Rubén Calvo García (PSOE)

Area
  - Total: 38.60 km^{2} (14.90 sq mi)
- Elevation: 720 m (2,360 ft)

Population (2025-01-01)
  - Total: 1,608
  - Density: 41.66/km^{2} (107.9/sq mi)

For people with the surname, see Pulgar (surname). Pulgar is a Spanish municipality in the Province of Toledo.

== Geography ==
It borders five other municipalities in the Province of Toledo: Noez, Mazarambroz, Las Ventas con Peña Aguilera, Cuerva and Totanés.

== Demography ==
The following table shows the evolution of the number of inhabitants between 1996 and 2006 according to data from the INE.

Historical population

Year	Pop.	±%
1996	1,235	—
1998	1,235	+0.0%
1999	1,232	−0.2%
2000	1,268	+2.9%
2001	1,281	+1.0%
2002	1,306	+2.0%
2003	1,306	+0.0%

Year	Pop.	±%
2004	1,362	+4.3%
2005	1,420	+4.3%
2006	1,460	+2.8%
2011	1,700	+16.4%
2021	1,484	−12.7%
2023	1,528	+3.0%

Source: INE
