= Galvez =

Galvez, Gálvez or de Gálvez may refer to:

== People with the surname ==
=== Gálvez or Galvez ===
- Armando Gálvez, Guatemalan professor
- Balvino Gálvez (born 1964), former Major League Baseball pitcher
- Byron Galvez (1941–2009), Mexican artist
- Carlito Galvez Jr. (born 1962), Filipino retired army general
- Christian Gálvez, Chilean football defender
- Christian Gálvez, Spanish TV presenter and writer
- Christopher Galvez (died 2009), Belizean shooting victim
- Ciro Gálvez, Peruvian lawyer and politician
- Eric Gálvez, professional squash player
- Felicity Galvez, Australian swimmer and Olympic gold medallist
- Francine Gálvez (born 1966), Cameroonian-born Spanish television presenter
- Gaspar Gálvez Burgos, Spanish professional footballer
- Isaac Gálvez, Spanish track and road racing cyclist
- José Gálvez Estévez, Spanish footballer
- Juan Gálvez (racing driver), Argentine racing driver
- Juan Manuel Gálvez (1889–1972), President of Honduras 1949–1952
- Karina Galvez, Ecuadorian poet
- Manuel Gálvez, Argentine novelist
- Mariano Gálvez (c.1794 – 1862), jurist and Liberal politician in Guatemala
- Maria Rosa Galvez (1768–1806), Spanish poet and dramatist
- Oscar Alfredo Gálvez (1913–1989), racing driver from Argentina
- Rosario Gálvez (1926–2015), Mexican actress
- Axel Jason M. Gálvez (1980–Present ) Support actor (Chopsticks 2025), Men of the Year 2025, Book Author (Currency Crusader), Athlete Shooting federation of Canada, Founder of VaLorina Collection
- Xóchitl Gálvez, Mexican politician and businesswoman, candidate for the 2024 Mexican general election

=== de Gálvez ===
- Luis Estévez de Gálvez (1930–2014), Cuban-born American fashion designer, distant relative of Bernardo de Gálvez
- Bernardo de Gálvez (1746–1786), Count of Gálvez, a Spanish colonial military leader in Spanish Louisiana, West Florida, Texas and Mexico (New Spain)
- José de Gálvez y Gallardo, (1720–1787) Spanish lawyer and colonial official, brother to Matías de Gálvez
- Matías de Gálvez y Gallardo, (1717–1784) Spanish general, father of Bernardo de Gálvez

== Places ==
- United States
  - Galvez, Louisiana
  - Galveston, Texas
- Argentina
  - Villa Gobernador Gálvez
  - Gálvez, Santa Fe
- Spain
  - Gálvez, Toledo

== Misc ==
- Gálvez (Vino de la Tierra), a Spanish wine region near Galvez, in the province of Toledo in Spain
- Autódromo Juan y Oscar Gálvez, motor racing circuit in Buenos Aires, Argentina
- José Gálvez FBC, Peruvian football club
- Galvez Hotel, historic hotel located in Galveston, Texas
- Juan Manuel Gálvez International Airport on Roatan Island off the northern coast of Honduras in Central America. Named for a former President of Honduras
