= Arisgotas =

- Minor local entity
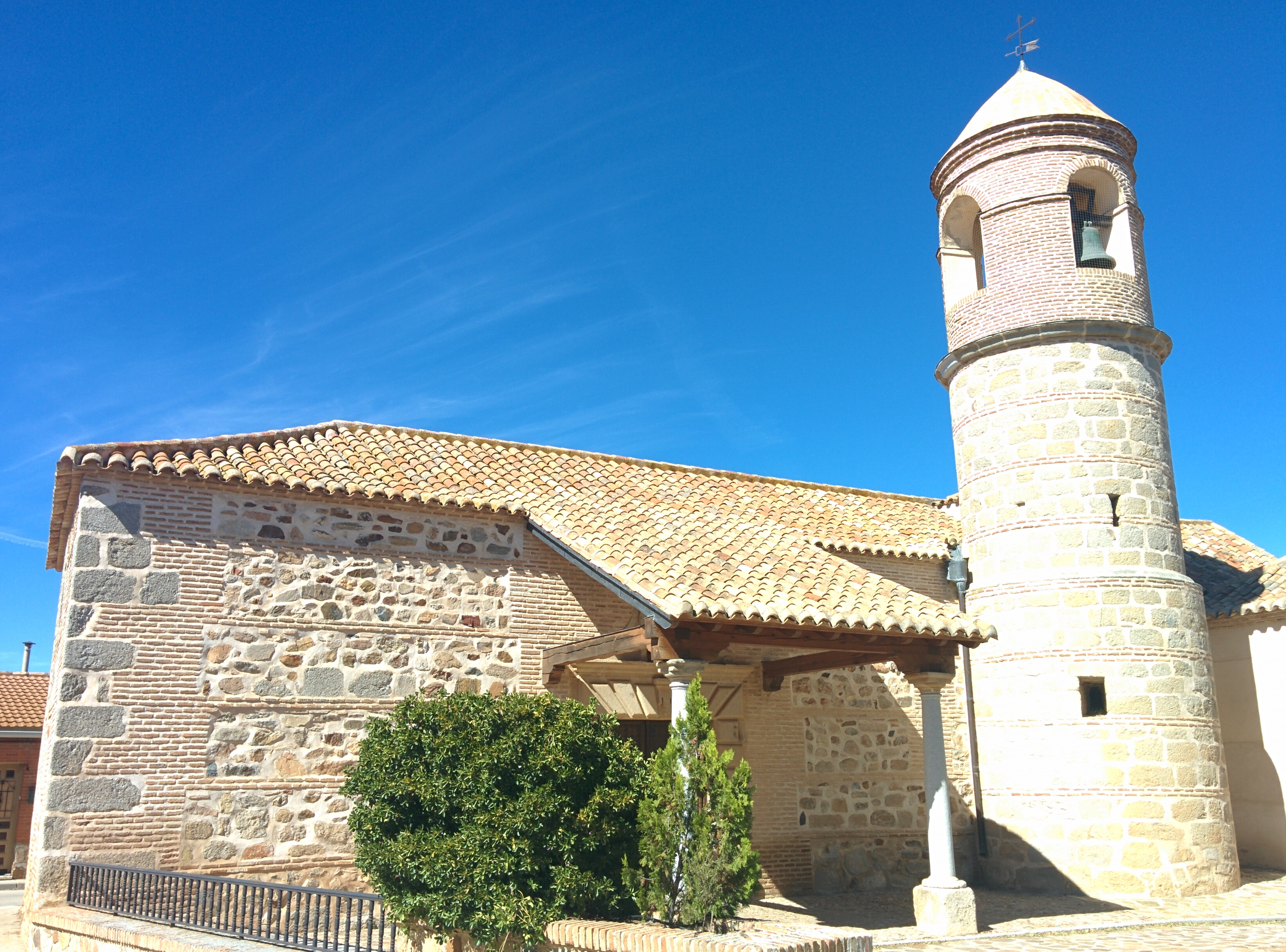
- Interactive map of Arisgotas
- Coordinates: 39°38′48″N 3°52′38″W
- Country: Spain
- Autonomous Community: Castile-La Mancha
- Province: Toledo
- Comarca: Montes de Toledo
- Municipality: Orgaz

Area
  - Total: 17.92 km^{2} (6.92 sq mi)
- Elevation: 783 m (2,569 ft)

Population (2024)
  - Total: 47
  - Density: 2.6/km^{2} (6.8/sq mi)
- Time zone: UTC+1 (CET)
  - Summer (DST): CEST

Arisgotas is a Spanish locality in the province of Toledo, in the autonomous community of Castilla–La Mancha, belonging to the municipality of Orgaz. It has a population of 47 inhabitants (INE 2023).

== Toponimy ==
The toponym Arisgotas, with the suffix -gotas derived from gotorum, could mean either "Oak Grove of the Goths" or "Army of the Goths" (or possibly "Army of the Good Ones").

== Geography ==
Arisgotas is a village (pedanía) of the municipality of Orgaz in the traditional comarca of La Sisla and the administrative comarca of Montes de Toledo, in the province of Toledo, Castilla–La Mancha, Spain. It lies about 3 km southwest of Orgaz. The surrounding landscape features rolling granite hills, cereal fields, olive groves, and Mediterranean woodlands of holm oak and Portuguese oak.

The Arroyo de Arisgotas runs through the village; after joining the Arroyo de Casalgordo it becomes the Guazalete river.

Arisgotas has a Mediterranean climate, with long, dry summers and cold, dry winters. Annual precipitation averages around 450 mm, mainly between October and May, with a pronounced drought from June to September. Mean temperatures range from around 0 °C in January to 32 °C in July.

== History ==
From the reign of Theudis (531–548), the Visigoths began settling on former Hispano-Roman villages. Two notable settlements from that time were Guadamur to the north, and Arisgotas and Casalgordo to the south. In 711, the Berber general Tariq ibn Ziyad, on his way to conquer Toledo, entered the region of La Sisla through Marjaliza and passed through Arisgotas.

Arisgotas remained an independent municipality until 1857, when it was annexed to the municipality of Orgaz.

== Patrimony ==
- Church of Nuestra Señora de la Asunción: example of enigmatic vernacular architecture. The aisleless church is aligned with the rising sun. Constructed of masonry and brick, it features a south‑facing ashlar entrance beneath a portico supported by two freestanding columns on plinths. The adjacent circular tower comprises three stages: the first two built of high‑quality masonry with double brick courses and an interior spiral staircase, and a later third brick stage forming a bell gable with four semicircular arches. Various Visigothic reliefs adorn the facade.
- Museum of Visigothic Art: established in the 21st century to highlight Arisgotas’ significant Early Medieval past. The museum houses high‑quality 7th‑century Visigothic stone reliefs largely sourced from the archaeological sites of Los Hitos and San Pedro de la Mata in neighbouring Casalgordo. It features multiple exhibition rooms with didactic museographic displays and a multimedia presentation including virtual reconstructions of key monuments and a topographic model of the region.
- Los Hitos archaeological site: Hito means "standing stone". It is the location of a Visigothic palace, later turned into a villa for hunting and husbandry. It included various structures, notably the remains of a church converted into a mosque during the 8th‑century Islamic period. A dike protected the site against sudden floods of the Sierra Gorda stream. The complex fell into ruin after the conquest of Toledo by Alfonso VI of León and Castile and definitively after the battle of Consuegra (1097). It was subsequently used as a quarry by local villagers.

== Culture ==
=== Festivities ===
- February 2, 3, and 4: Celebration of the Candlemas and Saint Blaise.
- First Sunday of May: Festival of the Cristo de la Fe.
