= Roman aqueducts of Toledo =

There are remains of two Roman aqueducts which supplied the Roman city of Toletum (modern Toledo) in Castile-La Mancha, Spain. The infrastructure carried water from various sources with the main reservoir located at Mazarambroz to the south of the city in the Montes de Toledo Comarca.

== History ==
The Romans captured Toledo in 193 BC. The aqueducts are difficult to date precisely. They seem to have been built in the 1st or 2nd centuries AD.

== Remains ==
At Mazarambroz there is a ruined Roman dam, known as Alcantarilla, on the Guajaraz, a tributary of the Tagus. From Mazarambroz the water was conveyed via Layos (where there is a modern dam on the Guajaraz).

=== Horno de Vidrio ===
A pressure drop tower, popularly known as the Horno de Vidrio, survives in the final section of the aqueduct. Elsewhere the Romans used drop towers to harness water power for mills, but this structure functioned as a water energy dissipator. The water entered the tower via an arcade. The tower firstly facilitated the aqueduct a less steep path towards Toledo; secondly, it allowed the aqueduct to lose height without excessive slope.

=== Aqueduct bridge ===
Only the base of the aqueduct bridge by which water entered Toledo survives. From its position above the Tagus gorge, it has been suggested the Romans used an inverted siphon to bring the water into the city. Such technology is known to have been used elsewhere in the Iberian Peninsula, for example Cádiz, although it is not directly evidenced at Toledo.

=== Conservation ===
The remains of the hydraulic system are partly protected by a heritage designation (Bien de Interés Cultural).

== See also ==
- List of aqueducts in the Roman Empire
- List of Roman aqueducts by date
- Ancient Roman technology
- Roman engineering
