= Roman baths of Toledo =

Historic site in Toledo, Spain

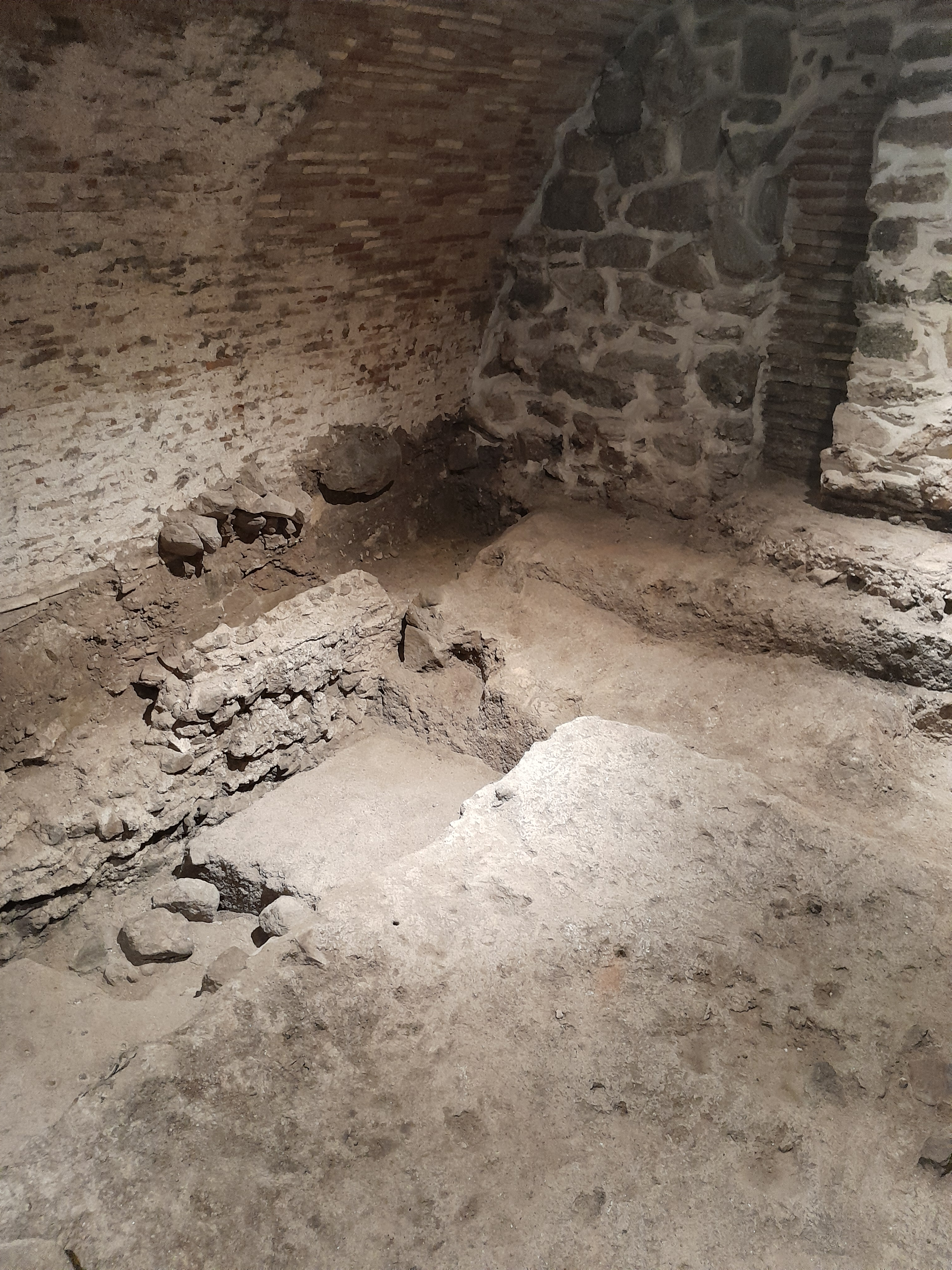
Remains of Roman baths in Toledo

The Roman baths of Toledo or Roman thermae of Amador de los Ríos are ruins of Roman thermae located in the city of Toledo in Castile-La Mancha, Spain. The baths can be seen as part of the system of supplying clean water to the city (then known by the Latin name of Toletum). From the scale of the surviving infrastructure, they are assumed to have been a public facility.

As regards chronology, the remains correspond to a period between the end of the 1st century and mid-2nd century CE.

== Water supply of Toletum ==
The location of the baths at Amador de los Ríos square is high above the River Tagus. In Roman times water was supplied from one of the river's tributaries and entered the city via an aqueduct about 80m above the Tajo. There was a storage system using large cisterns.

== Access ==
There is a section below a former church, the Oratorio de San Felipe de Neri. Another section was discovered underneath a building in 1986.

Some of the remains can currently be viewed underneath a shop.

== See also ==
- List of Roman public baths
- Alcantarilla Dam
- Oratorio de San Felipe de Neri, Toledo
- Roman aqueducts of Toledo
