= Church of San Pedro de la Mata =

Ruined heritage church in Sonseca, Spain

Coordinates: 39°36′56″N 3°59′10″W

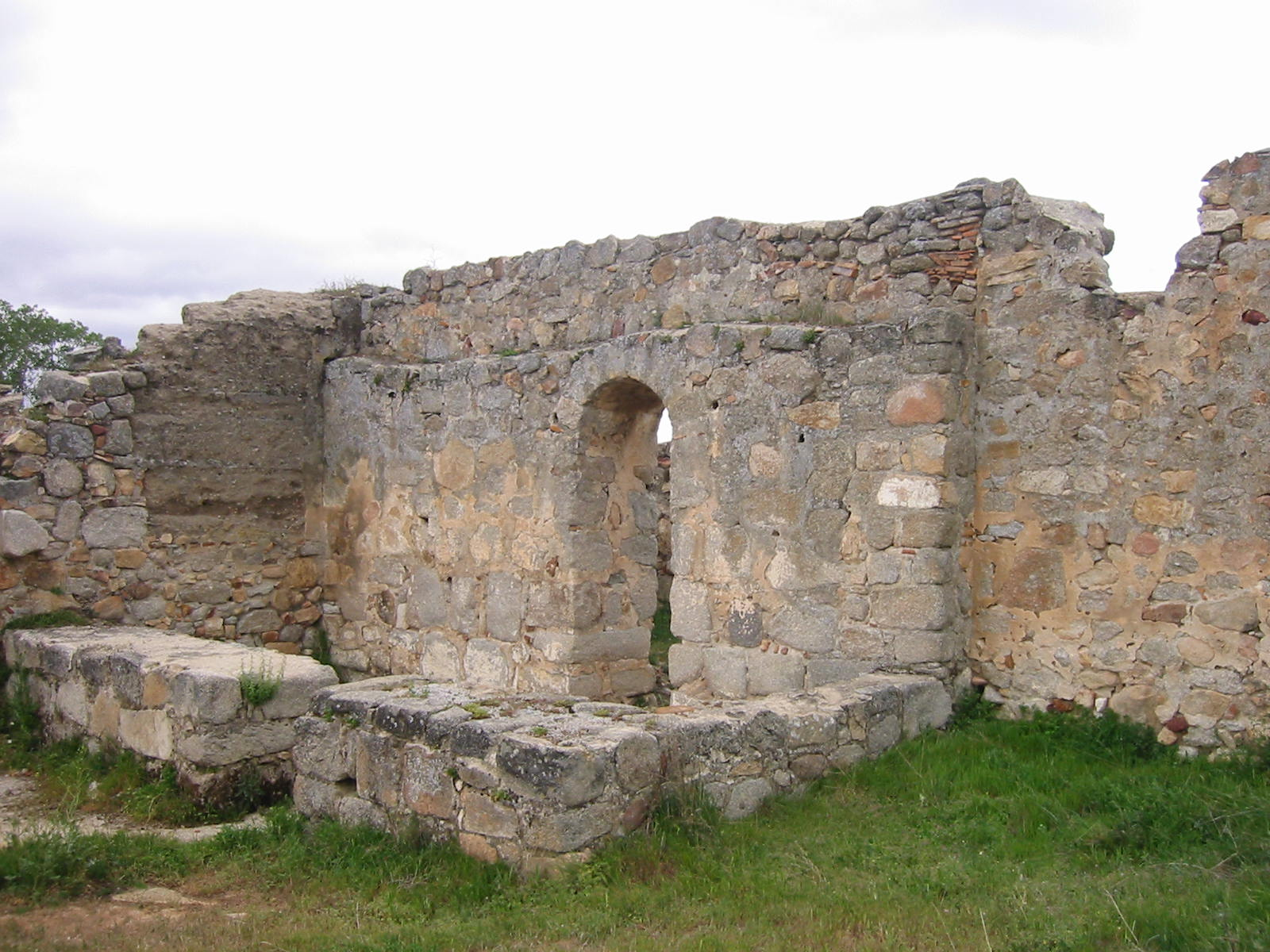

San Pedro de la Mata is a ruined medieval church in the municipality of Sonseca (province of Toledo, Castile-La Mancha, Spain). It is located in the middle of the countryside, at about 3 km southwest of the village (pedanía) of Casalgordo. (Note: The name appears in some publications as San Pedro of Arisgotas or Casalgordo for nearby settlements.)

== History ==
The building was remodelled early in its history, and because of the existence of different phases the dating of its features is problematic. According to traditional historiography, it was originally the church of a monastery, one of those that grew, promoted by the nobility, around the capital city of the Visigothic Kingdom of Toledo, similar to the case of Santa María de Melque not far from S. Pedro de la Mata. Such an origin would allow us to date the first church between 589 (conversion of Visigothic nobility to Catholicism) and 711 (takeover of the Visigothic kingdom by Muslim invasion). On the other hand, current thinking tends to view the site in the context of Mozarabic art and architecture, that is post-711.

== Conservation ==
The original foundations of a church, a granite platform, can be clearly seen. Some fragments of walls and a couple of arches also remain.

The site was given protection in the 1931 under Spanish legislation. It is listed as Ermita de San Pedro de la Mata. Its state has recently given cause for concern, according to the Spanish heritage organisation Hispania Nostra.

In the 21st century San Pedro de la Mata was proposed for World Heritage Site status along with nine other Mozarabic sites. The submission was made in 2019 by the Spanish Ministry of Culture and Sport and it was included on a "tentative list" (part of the nominating process).

== Access ==
The place can be reached by a dirt road starting west of the church of Casalgordo.

== Museum collections ==
In the nearby village (pedanía) of Arisgotas, municipality of Orgaz, there is a small Visigothic museum. The museum's collection include material from San Pedro and from a Visigothic archaeological site 3 km away called Los Hitos. It features carved stones that were looted by the local inhabitants for use as construction materials. In recent years, many of these Visigothic stones have been extracted from the walls of the village houses and deposited in the collection.

There is material from San Pedro in the Museum of Santa Cruz in Toledo.
