= Alcantarilla Dam =

Roman dam in Mazarambroz, Spain

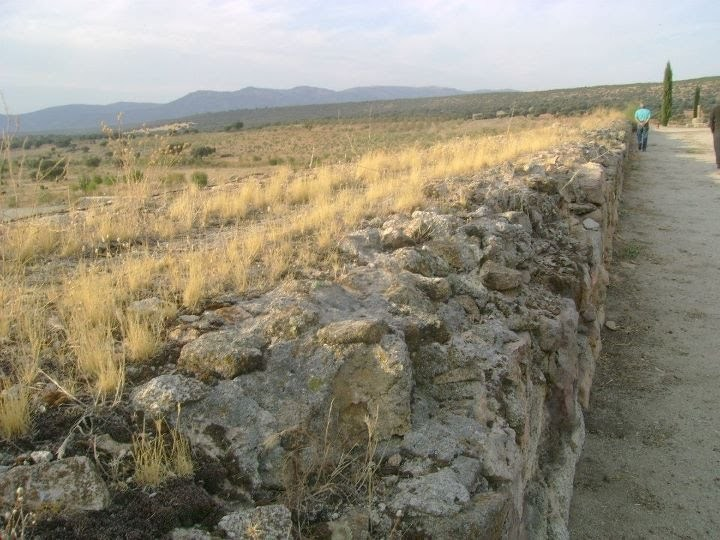
- Alcantarilla Dam in 2016

- Location within Spain
- Interactive map of Alcantarilla Dam
- Location: Sonseca and Mazarambroz Province of Toledo, Spain
- Coordinates: 39°39′36″N 4°3′28″W
- Opening date: 1st century

Dam and spillways
- Impounds: Guajaraz (Tagus basin)
- Height: 20 m (66 ft)
- Length: >800 m (2,600 ft)
- Width (base): 4 m (13 ft)?

The Alcantarilla Dam is an ancient Roman gravity dam built to supply water to the Roman city of Toletum (present-day Toledo, Spain), in the Roman province of Hispania Tarraconensis. It was constructed in the 2nd century BC on a tributary of the Tagus River. Currently in ruins, it is located between the towns of Sonseca and Mazarambroz (Toledo). It is believed to be the oldest dam in Spain and possibly the oldest known Roman dam.

The toponym "Alcantarilla" means conduit and is of Arabic origin: its Latin name is unknown. It was 20 metres (66 ft) high and at least 550 metres (1,800 ft) long. The water was conveyed to the city by an aqueduct which passed through Layos.

== Structure ==
The structure appears to have been similar to the surviving Proserpina Dam near Merida, an earth dam with a stone retaining wall. The upstream retaining wall consists of two parallel rubble-masonry walls about 1 metre (3.3 ft) thick, separated by a concrete-filled space approximately .6 metres (2.0 ft) wide. The upstream side of the wall was faced with cut stone blocks.

== Conservation ==
The structure has been in ruins for a long time. There has been speculation that it was not strong enough to cope with a large volume of water. It was possibly breached in the Roman era. Another possibility is that the masonry collapsed upstream, perhaps by the pressure of the earth fill when the water was low, since, unlike later dams, it was not buttressed on the upstream side.

The remains of Toledo's Roman water supply system are partly protected by a heritage designation (Bien de Interés Cultural).

== See also ==
- List of Roman dams and reservoirs
- Roman architecture
- Roman engineering
