= Sonseca =

Coordinates: 39°42′N 3°57′W

- municipality
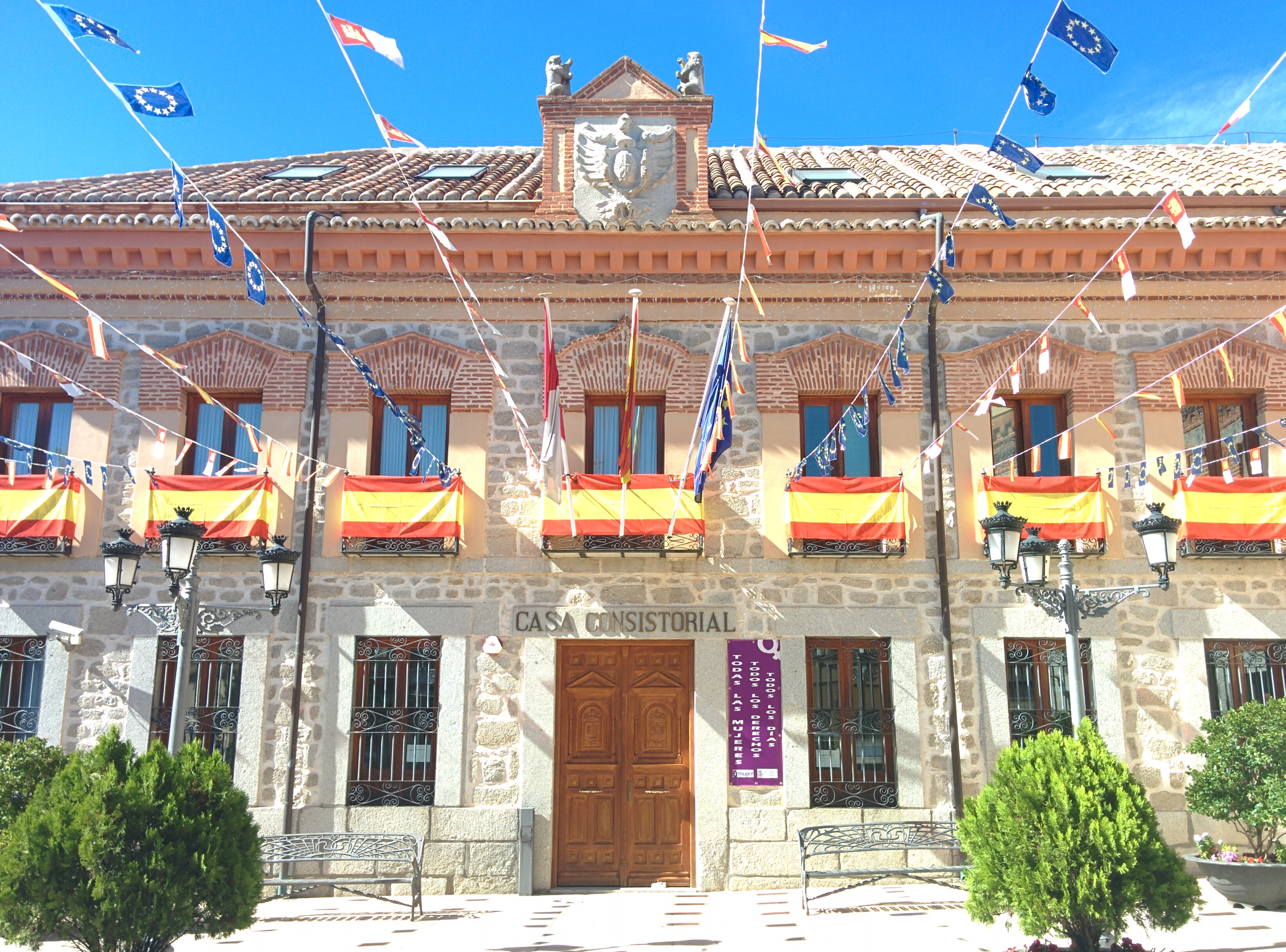
- Sonseca Town Hall

- Coat of arms
- Interactive map of Sonseca
- Country: Spain
- Autonomous community: Castile-La Mancha
- Province: Toledo
- Municipality: Sonseca

Area
  - Total: 60 km^{2} (23 sq mi)
- Elevation: 754 m (2,474 ft)

Population (2025-01-01)
  - Total: 11,452
  - Density: 190/km^{2} (490/sq mi)
- Time zone: UTC+1 (CET)
  - Summer (DST): UTC+2 (CEST)

Sonseca is a municipality in the province of Toledo, Castile-La Mancha, Spain. With a population of 11,452 inhabitants (INE 2025), it is the ninth most populated municipality in the province of Toledo.

== Toponomy ==
The prefix "son" could derive from the apocope of font, fonte, or fontes, which in turn comes from the Latin *fonte sica*, meaning "dry spring" or springs that do not flow, such as the numerous wells found in the orchards of its municipality. According to this, it would correspond to populations mentioned in the region during the 11th and 12th centuries, such as Fonte Sicca, Fontes, Selcal, or Fonte de Yuncar.

Between 1857 and 1960, the municipality was officially named Sonseca con Casalgordo.

== Geography ==
The municipality of Sonseca is located in the province of Toledo, within the autonomous community of Castilla-La Mancha, about 30 km south of the provincial capital, Toledo, and 120 km from Madrid. It borders the municipalities of Ajofrín, Orgaz, and Mazarambroz, all of them in the province of Toledo.

Sonseca is politically part of the Montes de Toledo Comarca, whose capital is Los Yébenes. It is the most populated municipality in this comarca. Historically and geographically, it belongs to La Sisla, where it serves as the capital and main settlement.

The municipality covers an area of 60.27 km^{2}. The altitude in the northern part is around 754 m above sea level, with slight variations near the Montes de Toledo, where the land gently rises to the south. Sonseca consists of two main settlements: the town of Sonseca and the hamlet of Casalgordo, located southwest of the municipality. Casalgordo was an independent municipality until 1853 and now has a small population.

Town	Distance (km)	Distance (mi)
Ajofrín	3.77	2.34
Mazarambroz	4.28	2.66
Orgaz	9.05	5.63
Nambroca	12.29	7.63
Mora	17.80	11.06
Toledo	20.50	12.74
Gálvez	25.13	15.61

== History ==
Probably of Roman origin, Sonseca was later inhabited by Visigoths and likely Mozarabs. Since the Middle Ages, it belonged to the municipal lordship of Toledo, with many properties owned by Toledo's residents and monasteries, such as the Monastery of Santo Domingo el Real. In 1629, Sonseca obtained the title of Villa after incurring significant debt, separating from Toledo's municipal jurisdiction and coming under royal jurisdiction. Unable to pay its debts, in 1640 the townspeople agreed to sell the lordship, jurisdiction, and vassalage to the Portuguese Duarte Fernández Acosta. His son Álvaro took possession of the Villa in 1641. During these centuries, especially in the 18th century, the town's textile industry developed. In the 19th century, the first marzipan workshops were established, and in the 1950s, the entrepreneur Antonio Moraleda founded Sonseca's furniture industry, which became a key sector in the town's development.

== Demographics ==
Historical population

Year	Pop.	±%
2000	10,083	—
2001	9,790	−2.9%
2002	9,845	+0.6%
2004	10,130	+2.9%
2005	10,132	+0.0%
2006	10,685	+5.5%
2007	10,818	+1.2%
2008	11,178	+3.3%
2009	11,265	+0.8%
2010	11,331	+0.6%
2011	11,530	+1.8%
2012	11,630	+0.9%

Year	Pop.	±%
2013	11,626	−0.0%
2014	11,437	−1.6%
2015	11,289	−1.3%
2016	11,198	−0.8%
2017	11,068	−1.2%
2018	11,021	−0.4%
2019	11,067	+0.4%
2020	11,082	+0.1%
2021	11,070	−0.1%
2022	11,084	+0.1%
2023	11,205	+1.1%
2024	11,328	+1.1%

Source: Instituto Nacional de Estadística

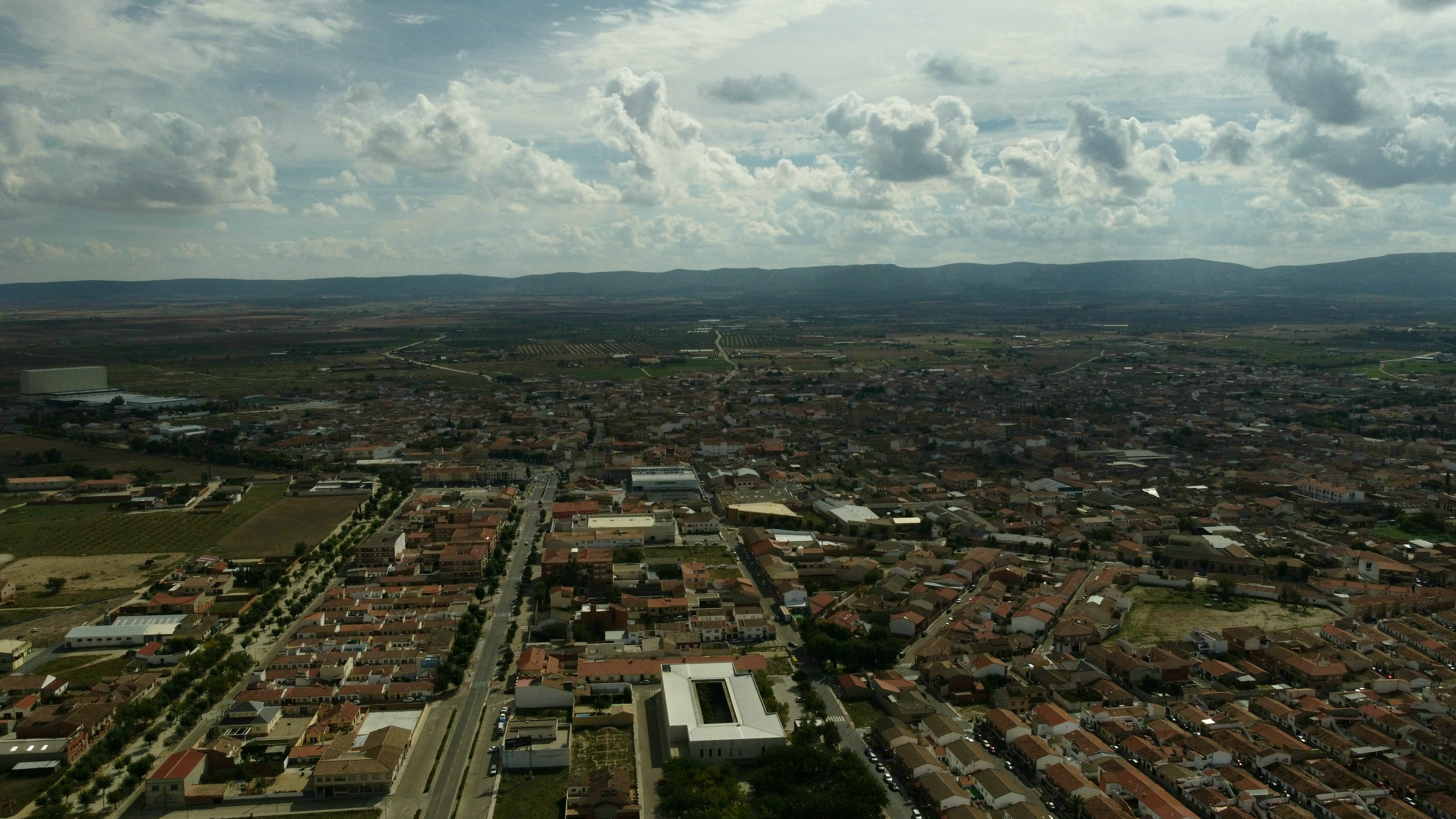
Sonseca from the air

Sonseca has consistently ranked among the Spanish towns with the highest immigration rates, comparable in relative terms to larger cities such as Valencia or Murcia.

As of 2024, its population stands at 11,452 inhabitants (INE), making it the ninth most populated municipality in the province of Toledo, following Toledo, Talavera de la Reina, Illescas, Seseña, Torrijos, Ocaña, Fuensalida, and Yuncos.

Due to its extensive industrial network, Sonseca also attracts a significant floating population from nearby towns and regions, especially during the peak production season of marzipan and turrón. It is estimated that the town provides around 10,000 jobs during this high-demand period.

== Administration ==
=== Mayors ===
Period	Name	Party
1979–1983	Vicente Sánchez Romero	CPLD
1983–1987	Juan Francisco Martín Ayuso	PSOE
1987–1991	Román Rojas Gómez	PSOE
1991–1995	Antonio Cerrillo Fernández	PSOE
1995–1999	Antonio Cerrillo Fernández (from 13 December 1998) Juan Carlos Palencia Sánchez	PSOE
1999–2003	Juan Francisco Martín Ayuso	PSOE
2003–2007	Juan Francisco Martín Ayuso	PSOE
2007–2011	José Millán Álvarez de la Cuerda	PP
2011–2015	Francisco José García Galán	PSOE
2015–2019	Juan Carlos Palencia Sánchez	PSOE
2019–2023	Sergio Mora Rojas	PSOE
2023–present	María Victoria Martín de San Pablo Sánchez	PP

== Patrimony ==
- Church of San Pedro de la Mata: the remains of a 7th-century Visigothic monastic church near Casalgordo, built in opus caementicium with a cruciform plan, lateral chambers, and a triple-chapel apse, comparable in layout to San Juan de Baños and Santa Lucía del Trampal.
- Vallehermoso Dam: a gravity dam built in the 2nd–3rd century AD on the seasonal Vallehermoso stream to capture floodwaters, extending over 100 m in length with preserved sections up to 3 m high and 1.85 m wide, located 7 km from Sonseca and 4 km from Casalgordo.
- Sonseca Seismological Station: a seismic monitoring installation established in February 1957 under the Madrid Pact for earthquake detection and nuclear explosion surveillance, forming part of Spain's national seismic network.
- Torre Tolanca: a 9th–10th-century Andalusian watchtower forming part of the Taifa of Toledo's visual signalling network, later reinforced with a Christian-period barbican, situated southwest of the town and accessible via the Camino de la Estrella.
- Parish Church of Saint John the Evangelist: a Plateresque-style parish church begun in the mid-16th century and expanded between 1899 and 1902, featuring a rosette-adorned façade, a square-based bell tower, and an interior nave with late-Gothic windows.
- Hermitage of Cristo de la Vera Cruz: a mid-16th-century Mudejar hermitage built under the invocation of the Holy Christ of the True Cross, constructed in masonry with granite quoins and a brick bell gable, retaining an original inscription dated 1564 and an interior Baroque altarpiece.

== Culture ==
=== Gastronomy ===
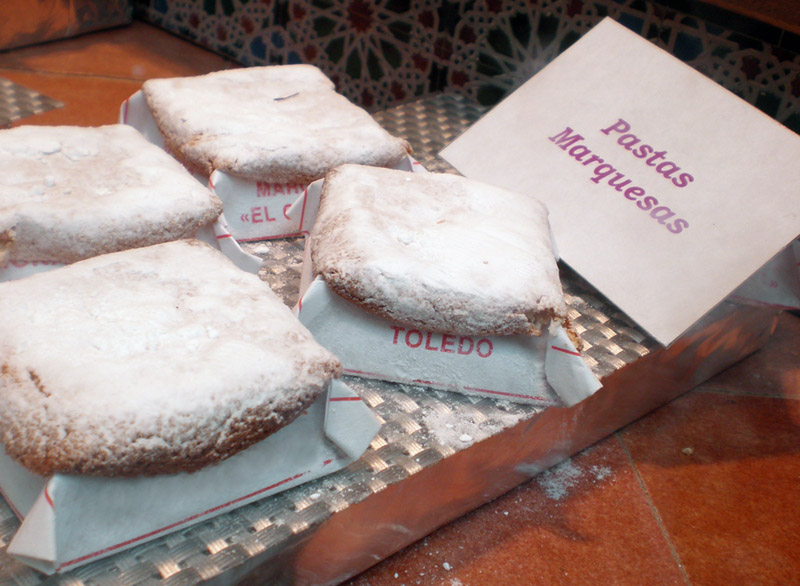
Pasta marquesa

Sonseca's cuisine includes Manchego dishes such as migas manchegas, gachas manchegas, caldereta de cordero, and pisto manchego. The town is known for its marzipan and for its almond biscuits called pastas marquesas. During the Christmas season, Sonseca hosts Delaviuda Confectionery Group, a turrón manufacturer founded in 1927.

=== Festivities ===
- May 6: Feast of Saint John the Evangelist
- First Saturday after May 9: Pilgrimage of Saint Gregory Nazianzus
- Third weekend of May: Small Fair (Feria Chica)
- September 8: Feast of the Virgin of Remedies

=== Sports ===
Sonseca is home to Club Deportivo Sonseca, a football team founded in 1959. The club plays in the Tercera Federación – Group 18 and hosts its games at the Estadio Municipal Martín Juanes, which holds 2,000 spectators.
