= Roman remains under Alfonso X street =

The Roman remains under Alfonso X street, generally called "the chambers of Hacienda", are located in the city of Toledo, in Castilla-La Mancha, Spain. The remains are chambers that supplied water to a thermal bath dated from around 1st century AD. There is one large arched central gallery, entered through three parallel arched galleries, that reside beneath the hypocaust of the thermal baths at Plaza de Amador de los Ríos. They were hidden until 1628 when construction began on the Society of Jesus building, which was recorded by Julio Porres. They were rediscovered in 1918.
