= Layos Sarcophagus =

Paleochristian sarcophagus

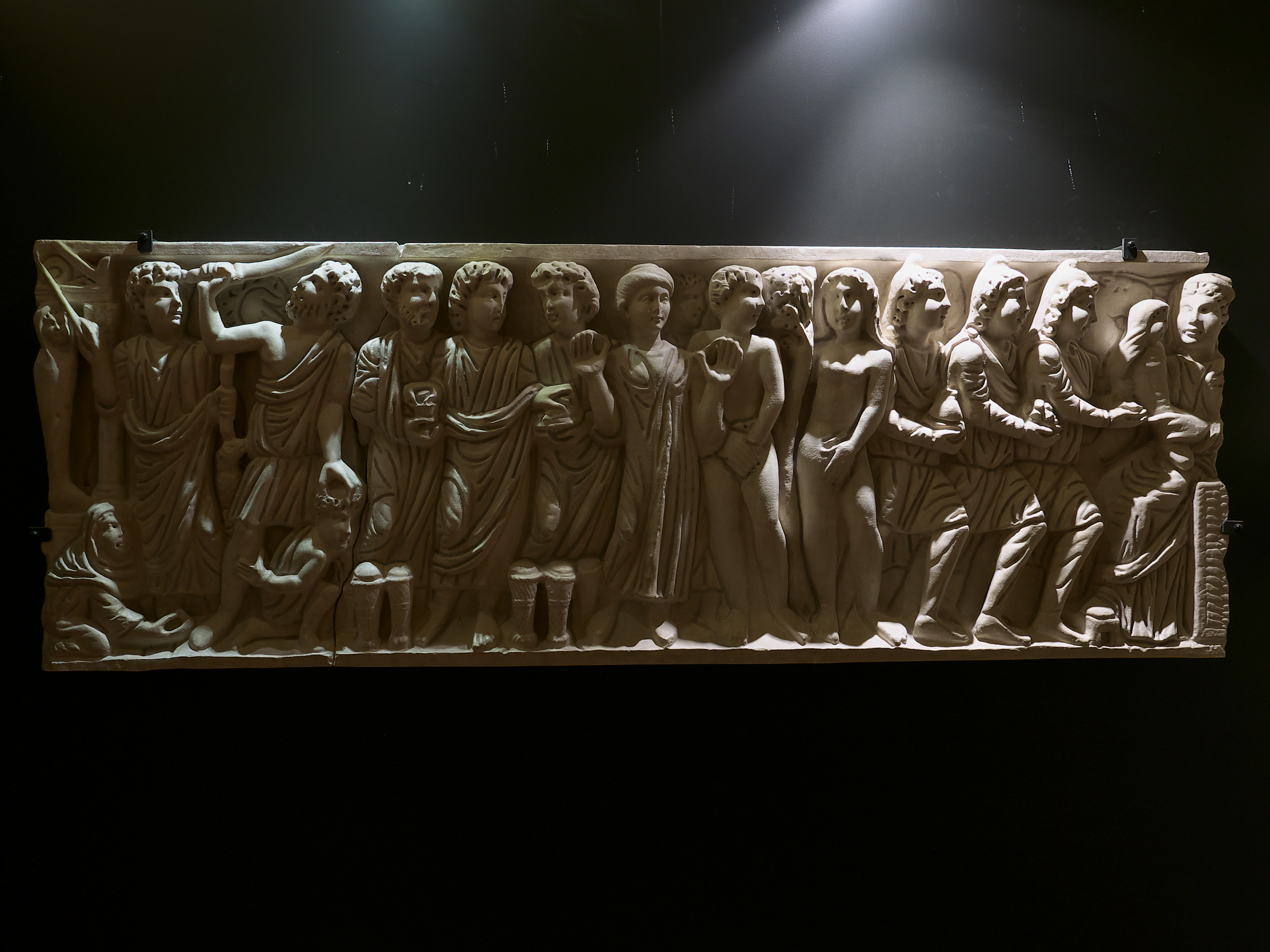
Layos Sarcophagus in Toledo

The Layos Sarcophagus is a paleochristian sarcophagus found in Layos, Toledo in 1627 and now in Barcelona.

The iconography is focused on the dogma of the Incarnation, and it is opposed to docetism and monophysitism.

== Access ==
The original is kept at the Museu Frederic Marès in Barcelona. In October 2007 two replicas arrived in Castilla La Mancha. One was put on show at the Visigothic Museum (Museo de los Concilios y de la Cultura Visigoda).

== See also ==
There is another sarcophagus from Layos in the Real Academia de la Historia.

== Bibliography ==
- Sotomayor, Manuel (1975). Sarcófagos romano-cristianos de España. Estudio iconográfico. Granada.
- Maier, Jorge (2007). "Aureliano Fernández-Guerra y Giovanni Battista de Rossi y la arqueología paleocristiana en la segunda mitad del siglo XIX". In Beltrán, J.; Cacciotti, B.; Palma, B (eds.). Coleccionismo, Arqueología y Antigüedad: España e Italia siglo XIX. Sevilla. pp. 299–349.
