= Driebes =

Driebes, Spain
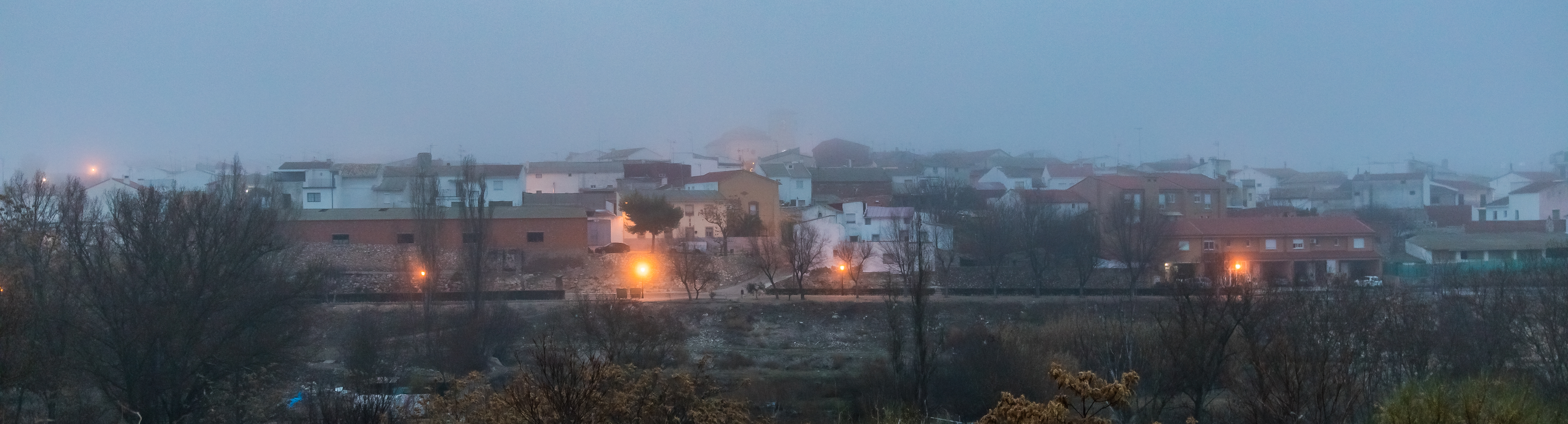

- Coat of arms

- Location within Province of Guadalajara Location within Castilla-La Mancha Location within Spain
- Coordinates: 40°14′46″N 3°02′27″W
- Country: Spain
- Autonomous community: Castile-La Mancha
- Province: Guadalajara
- Municipality: Driebes

Area
  - Total: 37.91 km^{2} (14.64 sq mi)

Population (2025-01-01)
  - Total: 331
  - Density: 8.73/km^{2} (22.6/sq mi)
- Time zone: UTC+1 (CET)
  - Summer (DST): UTC+2 (CEST)

Driebes is a municipality located in the province of Guadalajara, Castile-La Mancha, Spain. According to the 2004 census (INE), the municipality has a population of 361 inhabitants.
