= Navalpino =

- Flag Coat of arms

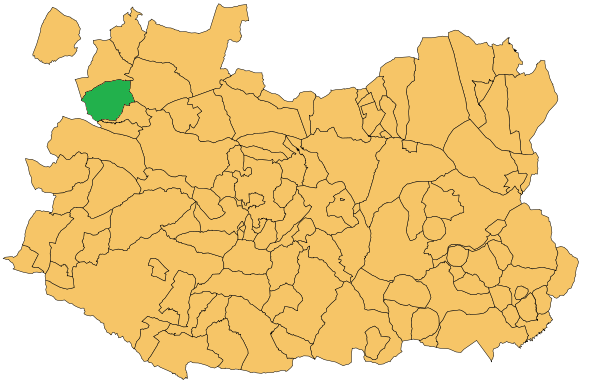

- Location in Spain
- Coordinates: 39°13′N 4°35′W
- Province: Ciudad Real
- Comarca: Montes de Toledo

Area
  - Total: 196.33 km^{2} (75.80 sq mi)
- Elevation: 700 m (2,300 ft)

Population (2025-01-01)
  - Total: 193
  - Density: 0.983/km^{2} (2.55/sq mi)
- Time zone: UTC+1 (CET)
  - Summer (DST): UTC+2 (CEST)
- Postcode: 13193

Navalpino is a municipality in Ciudad Real, Castile-La Mancha, in the Montes de Toledo area of Spain. In the 2014 census, it has a population of 241.
