= Oratorio de San Felipe de Neri, Toledo =

Church in Toledo, Spain

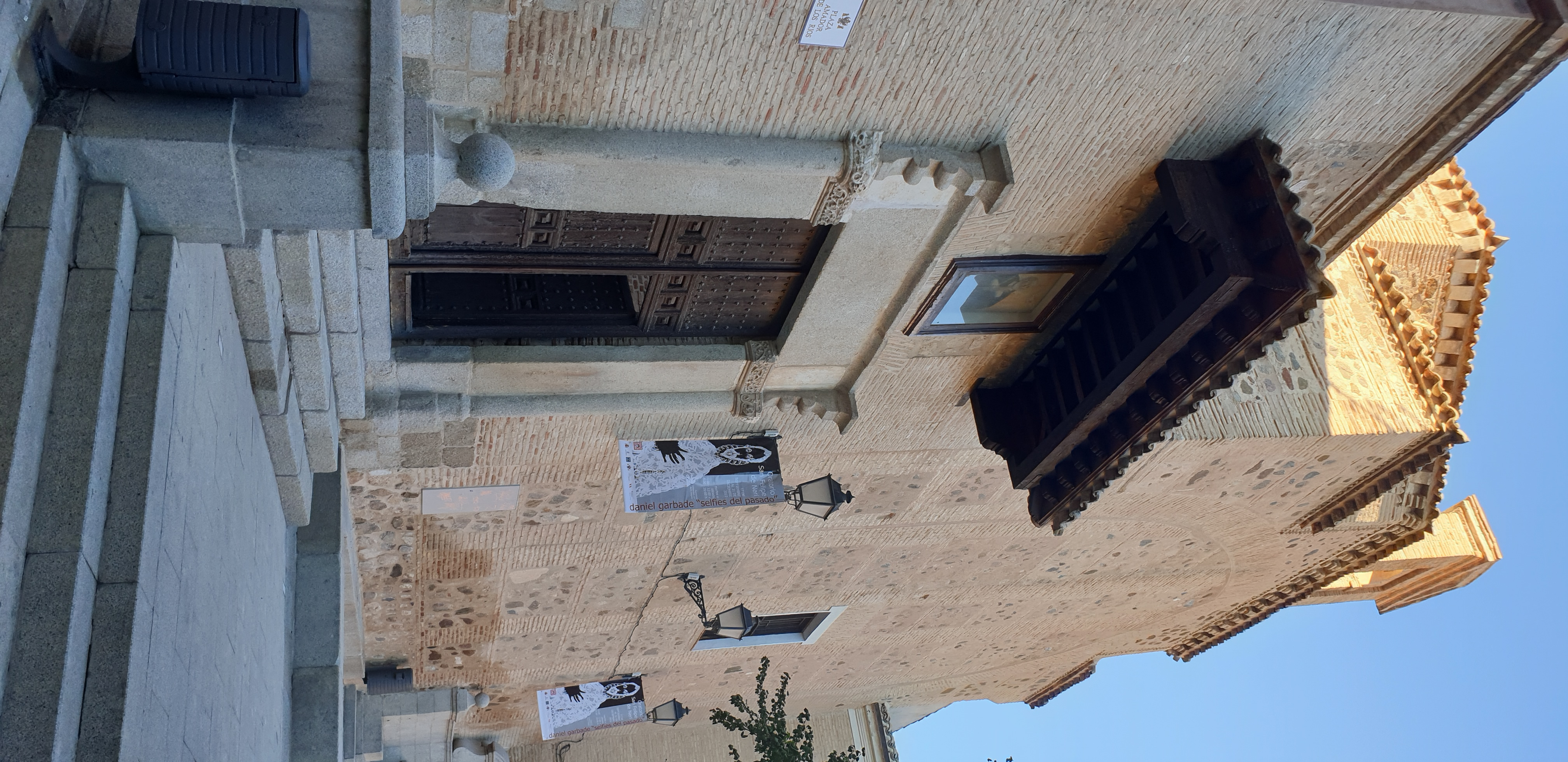
Oratorio de San Felipe Neri

The Oratory of Saint Philip Neri (Spanish: San Felipe de Neri) is a former church in Toledo (Castile-La Mancha, Spain). The building was used by the Congregation of the Oratory of Saint Philip Neri as an oratory (chapel).

== History ==
The building is the surviving portion of the church of San Juan Bautista (demolished between 1771 and 1777).

This Church was also called San Juan de la Leche (for a goatyard whose milk they sold).

It was founded in 1125 and, with Gothic traces. It was rebuilt between the late 15th century and early 16th century.

A remnant of what could be the sacristy is a yeseria of good design with remains of polychrome.

In the wall of the gospel the Oratory's main Chapel was built, built by Sancho Sánchez de Toledo.

Pisa, in its History of Toledo, places this chapel among the best in the city.

In the recent restoration a Gothic polychrome was discovered.

Its design favoured conceptual unity and over time increased Escario's reception.

== Roman baths ==
The Roman baths of Toledo were located in the area of the Oratory, and there are some remains under the church. They date from the 1st century CE, when Toledo was known as Toletum.

== Exhibitions ==
From 2013 - 2018 it housed the Tolmo Museum, Owned by the Government of Castilla-La Mancha the Oratorio was ceded in January 2019 to the Consortium of the City of Toledo, after an agreement signed between both parties. Under ist management it opens its doors for prestigious art exhibitions in 2022. They show contemporary art, such as the cycle "Presence and Essence" with the exhibition "Memories" by the local artists Alfredo Copeiro and José Delgado Periñan and the art installation "Selfis of the past" by Swiss artist Daniel Garbade.
