= Pulgar (surname) =

Pulgar is a surname. Notable people with the surname include:

- Ángel Pulgar (born 1989), Venezuelan track cyclist
- Edward Pulgar (born 1974), Venezuelan violinist and conductor
- Erick Pulgar (born 1994), Chilean footballer
- Hernando del Pulgar (1436 – c. 1492), Castilian royal secretary
- Mónica Pulgar (born 1971), Spanish basketball player
