= Argés =

Argés, Spain
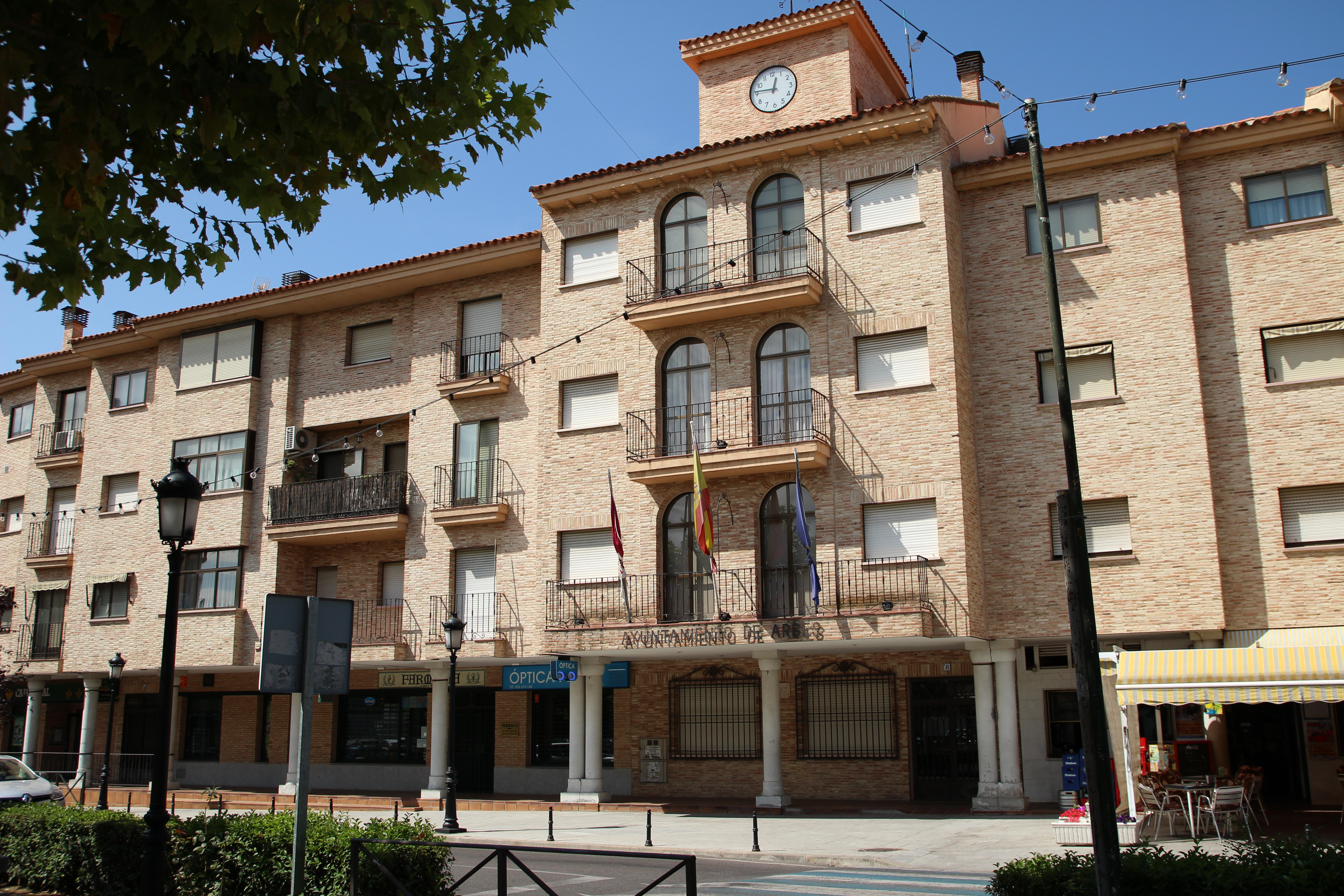

- Flag Coat of arms

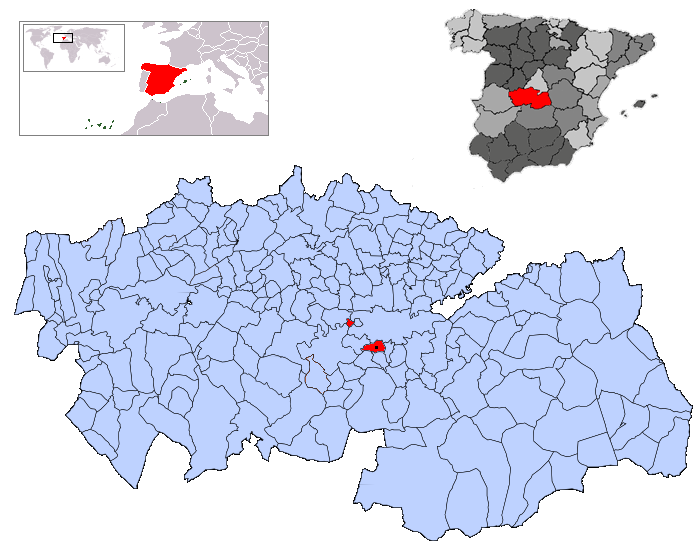
- Location in the province of Toledo

- Location in Spain
- Coordinates: 39°48′18″N 4°03′26″W
- Country: Spain
- Autonomous community: Castile-La Mancha
- Province: Toledo
- Municipality: Argés
- Elevation: 676 m (2,218 ft)

Population (2025-01-01)
  - Total: 7,178
  - Density: 153.9/km^{2} (399/sq mi)
- Time zone: UTC+1 (CET)
  - Summer (DST): UTC+2 (CEST)

Argés is a municipality located in the province of Toledo, Castile-La Mancha, Spain. According to the 2006 census (INE), the municipality had a population of 4,309.

== Demographics ==
Historical population
Year	Pop.	±%
1900	575	—
1910	683	+18.8%
1920	710	+4.0%
1930	731	+3.0%
1940	447	−38.9%
1950	538	+20.4%
1960	601	+11.7%
1970	509	−15.3%
1981	1,166	+129.1%
1991	1,870	+60.4%
2001	2,569	+37.4%
2011	5,643	+119.7%
2021	6,621	+17.3%
2023	6,961	+5.1%
Source: ISTAT
