= Cobisa =

Coordinates: 39°48′N 4°02′W

- municipality
- Flag Coat of arms
- Interactive map of Cobisa
- Country: Spain
- Autonomous community: Castile-La Mancha
- Province: Toledo
- Municipality: Cobisa

Area
  - Total: 15 km^{2} (5.8 sq mi)
- Elevation: 675 m (2,215 ft)

Population (2025-01-01)
  - Total: 4,550
  - Density: 300/km^{2} (790/sq mi)
- Time zone: UTC+1 (CET)
  - Summer (DST): UTC+2 (CEST)

Cobisa is a municipality located in the province of Toledo, Castile-La Mancha, Spain. According to the 2006 census (INE), the municipality has a population of 3207 inhabitants.

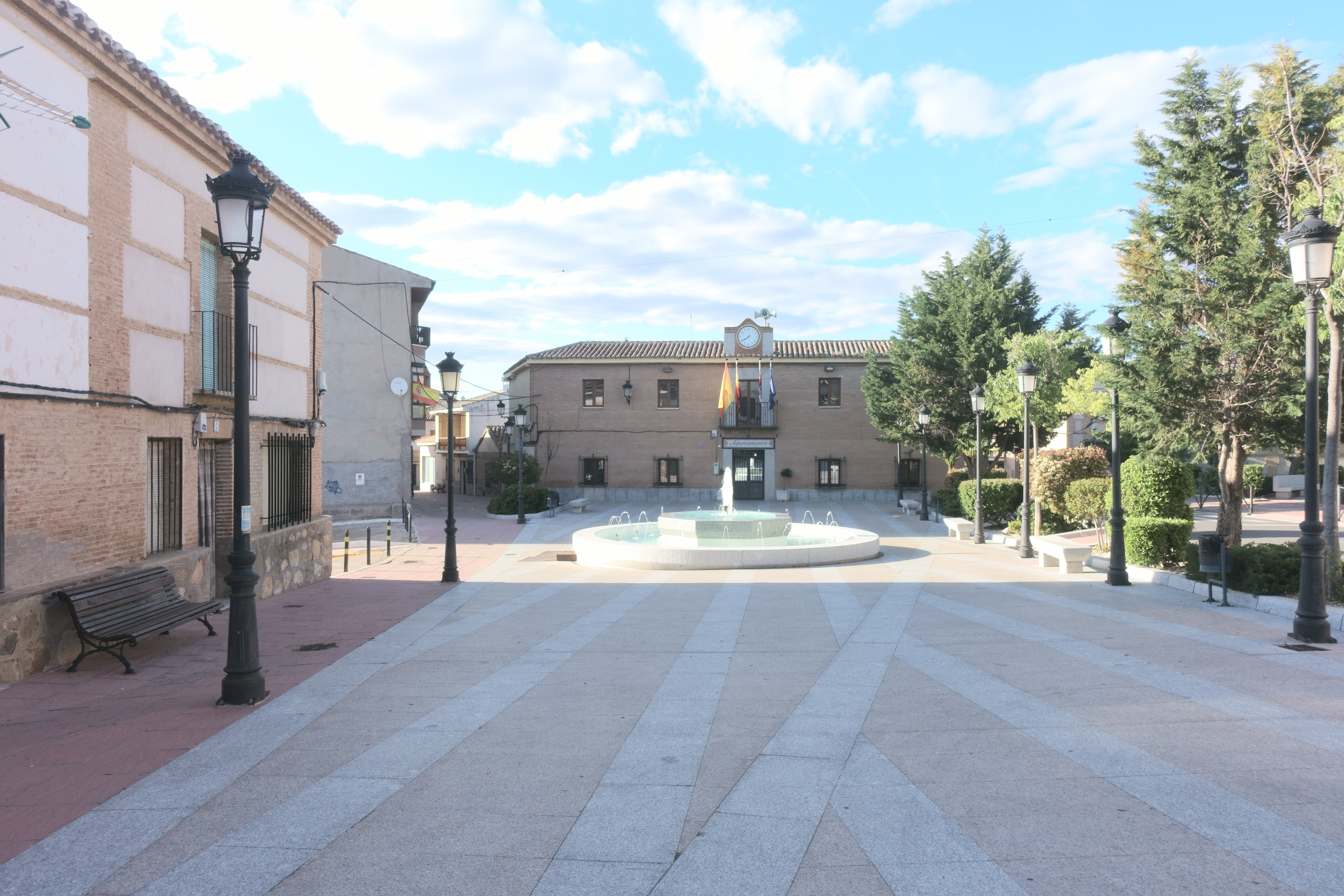
Concorde Square in Cobisa

== Demographics ==
Historical population
Year	Pop.	±%
1900	264	—
1910	305	+15.5%
1920	353	+15.7%
1930	361	+2.3%
1940	232	−35.7%
1950	309	+33.2%
1960	277	−10.4%
1970	213	−23.1%
1981	182	−14.6%
1991	354	+94.5%
2001	1,829	+416.7%
2011	4,045	+121.2%
2021	4,377	+8.2%
2023	4,452	+1.7%
Source: ISTAT
