= Polán =

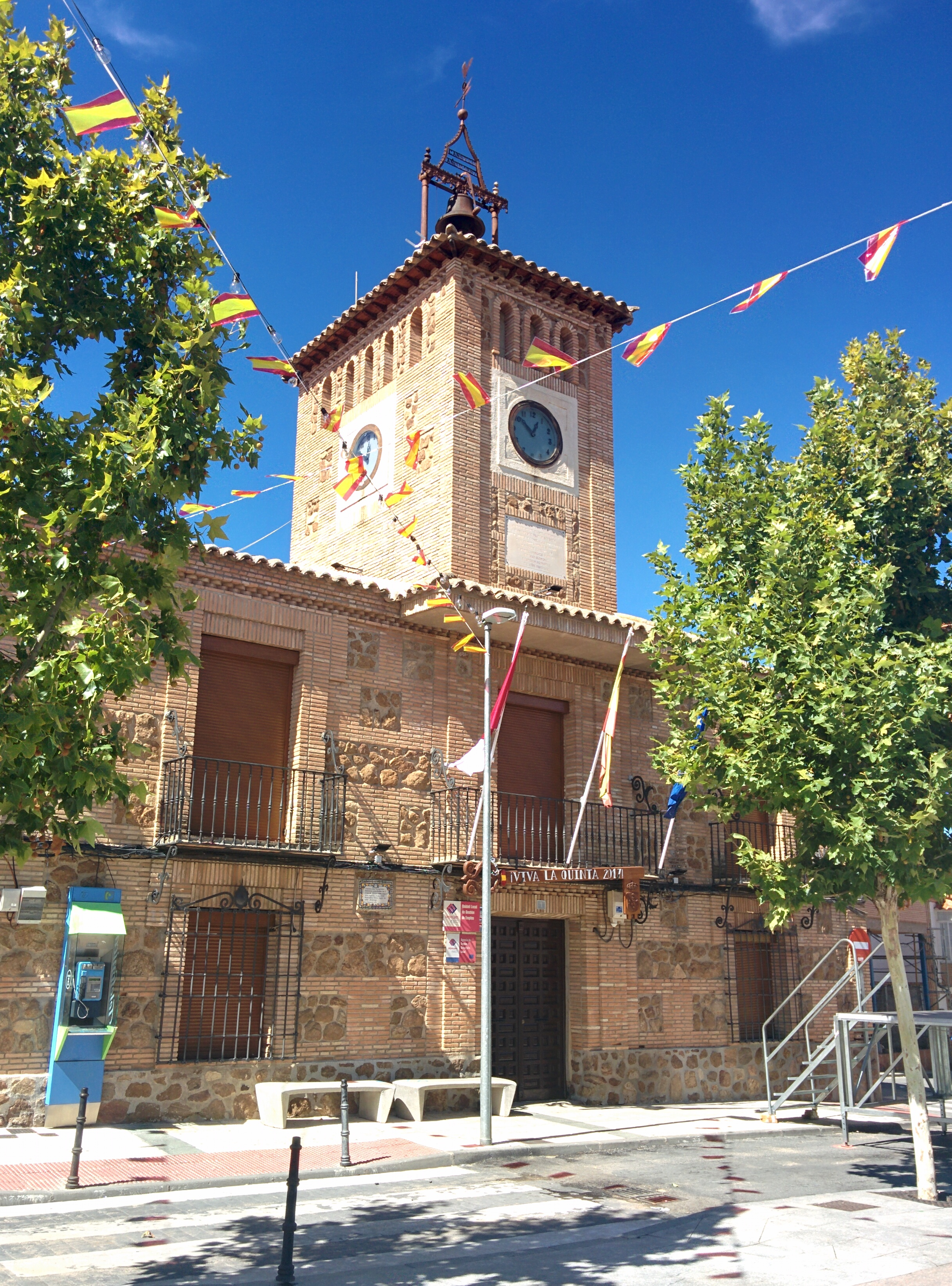
- Town hall

- Coat of arms

- Location in Spain
- Coordinates: 39°47′N 4°10′W
- Country: Spain
- Autonomous community: Castile-La Mancha
- Province: Toledo
- Comarca: Montes de Toledo

Area
  - Total: 158 km^{2} (61 sq mi)
- Elevation: 648 m (2,126 ft)

Population (2025-01-01)
  - Total: 3,941
  - Density: 24.9/km^{2} (64.6/sq mi)
- Time zone: UTC+1 (CET)
  - Summer (DST): UTC+2 (CEST)

Polán is a municipality located in the province of Toledo, Castile-La Mancha, Spain. According to the 2014 census, the municipality has a population of 3,952 inhabitants.

== Administration ==
This is the list of mayors from the democratic elections since 1979.

Period (of administration)	Name	Political party
1979-1983		
1983-1987		
1987-1991	Francisco Ludeña Ferrero	PP
1991-1995	Francisco Ludeña Ferrero	PP
1995-1999	Francisco Ludeña Ferrero	PP
1999-2003	Pedro Cano Gómez	PP
2003-2007	Antonio Cortés Jándula	PSOE
2007-2011	Antonio Cortés Jándula	PSOE

== Demographics ==
The following table shows the number of inhabitants of Polan between 1996 and 2006 according to data from the INE.

Year	Inhabitants
1996	3,246
1998	3,294
1999	3,310
2000	3,306
2001	3,349
2002	3,435
2003	3,533
2004	3,523
2005	3,703
2006	3,758
