= Chueca, Toledo =

Chueca
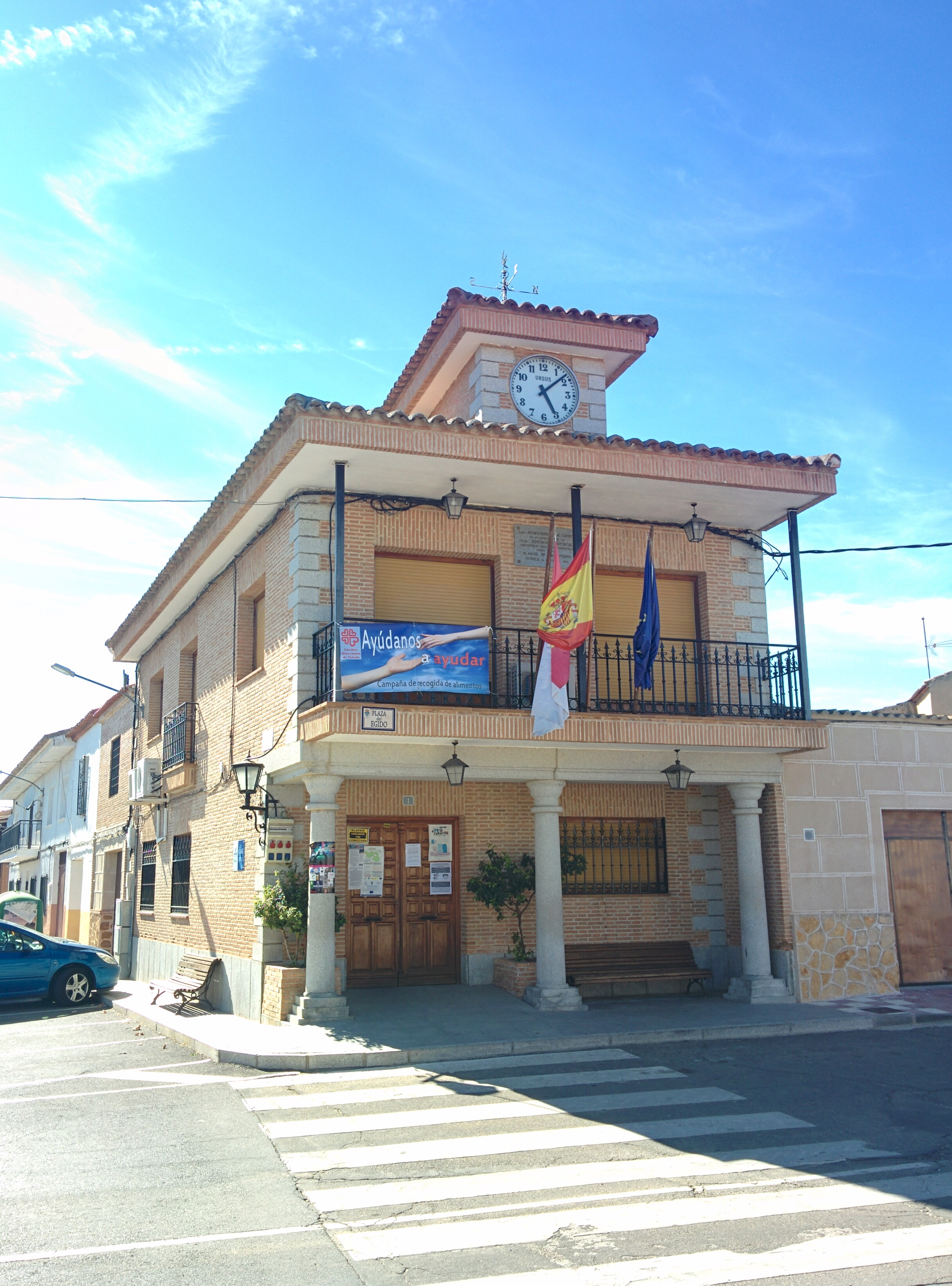
- Town Hall

- Coat of arms

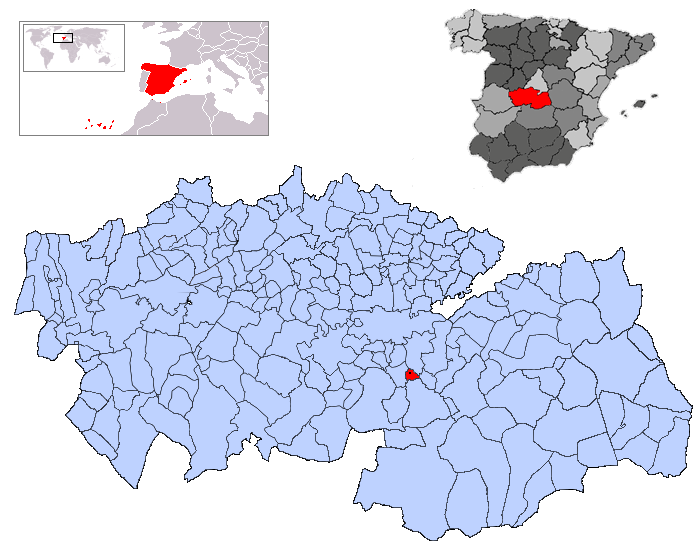

- Location in Spain
- Coordinates: 39°44′0″N 3°56′30″W
- Country: Spain
- Autonomous community: Castile-La Mancha
- Province: Toledo
- Municipality: Chueca

Area
  - Total: 44 km^{2} (17 sq mi)
- Elevation: 738 m (2,421 ft)

Population (2025-01-01)
  - Total: 252
  - Density: 5.7/km^{2} (15/sq mi)
- Time zone: UTC+1 (CET)
  - Summer (DST): UTC+2 (CEST)

Chueca is a municipality located in the province of Toledo, Castile-La Mancha, Spain. According to the 2014 census, the municipality has a population of 271 inhabitants.

== Demographics ==
Historical population
Year	Pop.	±%
1900	343	—
1910	375	+9.3%
1920	402	+7.2%
1930	390	−3.0%
1940	380	−2.6%
1950	410	+7.9%
1960	358	−12.7%
1970	367	+2.5%
1981	262	−28.6%
1991	242	−7.6%
2001	261	+7.9%
2011	264	+1.1%
2021	253	−4.2%
2023	254	+0.4%
Source: ISTAT
