= Manzaneque =

Coordinates: 39°38′N 3°47′W

- Municipality
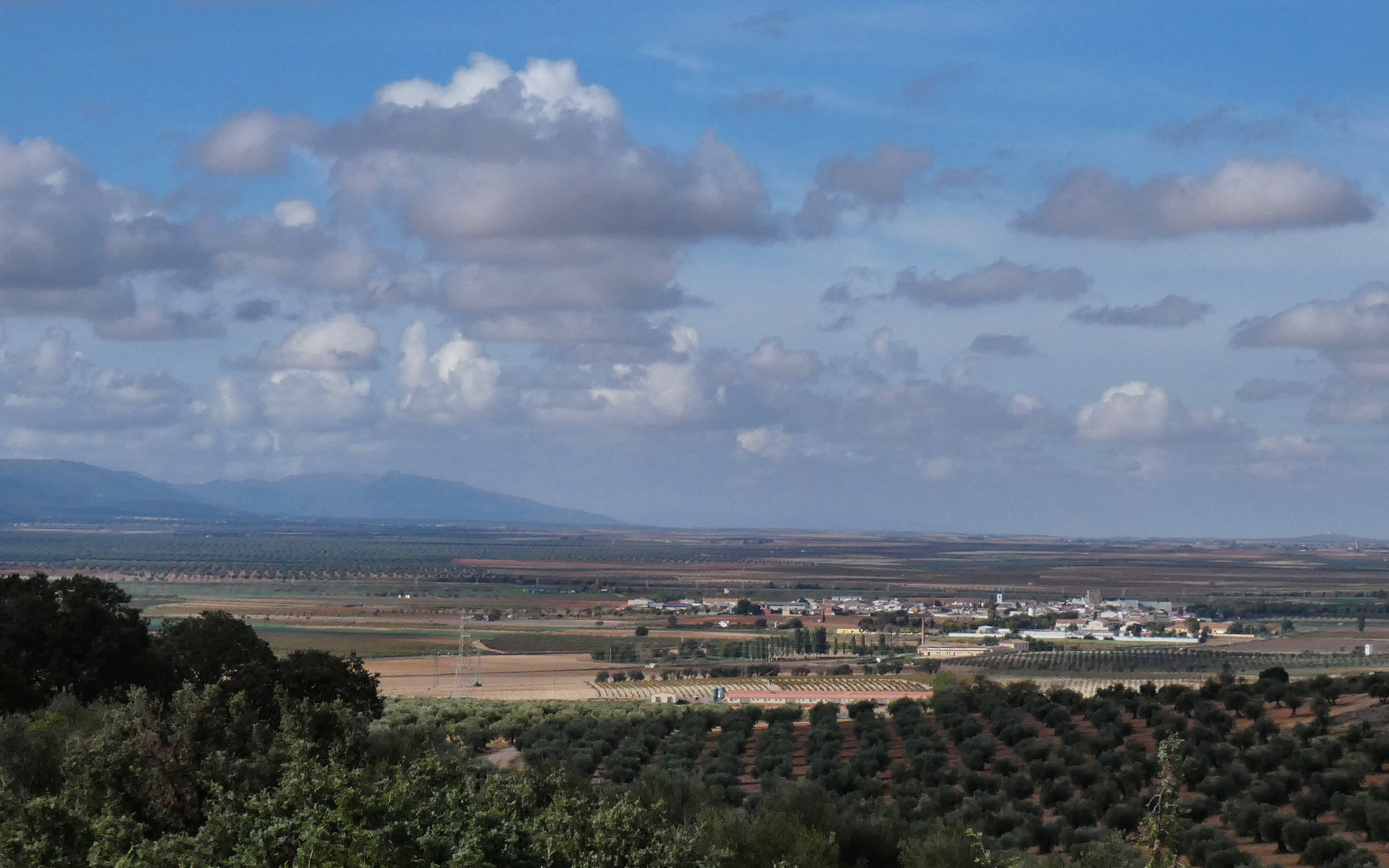
- Overview

- Coat of arms
- Interactive map of Manzaneque
- Country: Spain
- Autonomous community: Castile-La Mancha
- Province: Toledo

Area
  - Total: 12.22 km^{2} (4.72 sq mi)
- Elevation: 715 m (2,346 ft)

Population (2025-01-01)
  - Total: 407
  - Density: 33.3/km^{2} (86.3/sq mi)
- Time zone: UTC+1 (CET)
  - Summer (DST): UTC+2 (CEST)

Manzaneque is a municipality of Spain located in the province of Toledo, Castilla–La Mancha. The municipality spans across a total area of 12.22 km^{2} and, as of 1 January 2024, it has a registered population of 398.
