= Burguillos de Toledo =

Municipality in Castile-La Mancha, Spain

Coordinates: 39°48′N 3°59′W

- municipality
- Flag Coat of arms

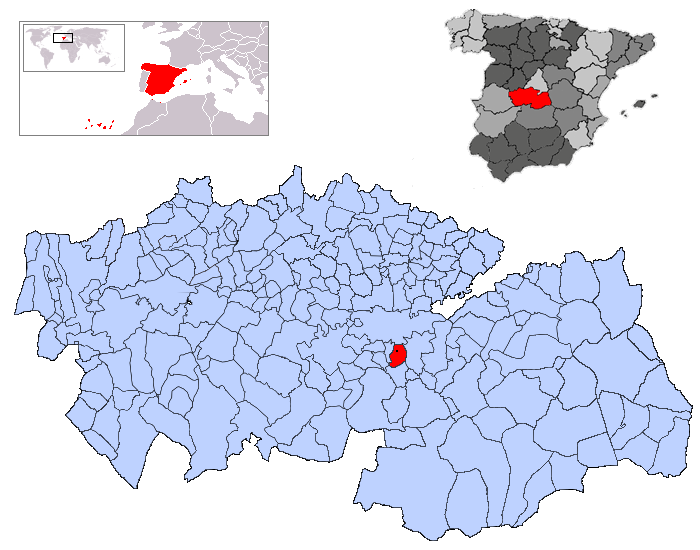
- Country: Spain
- Autonomous community: Castile-La Mancha
- Province: Toledo
- Municipality: Burguillos de Toledo

Area
  - Total: 28 km^{2} (11 sq mi)
- Elevation: 676 m (2,218 ft)

Population (2025-01-01)
  - Total: 3,872
  - Density: 140/km^{2} (360/sq mi)
- Time zone: UTC+1 (CET)
  - Summer (DST): UTC+2 (CEST)

Burguillos de Toledo is a municipality located in the province of Toledo, Castile-La Mancha, Spain. According to the 2006 census (INE), the municipality has a population of 1993 inhabitants.

== Demographics ==
Historical population
Year	Pop.	±%
1900	389	—
1910	472	+21.3%
1920	542	+14.8%
1930	514	−5.2%
1940	516	+0.4%
1950	621	+20.3%
1960	601	−3.2%
1970	600	−0.2%
1981	520	−13.3%
1991	681	+31.0%
2001	1,040	+52.7%
2011	2,734	+162.9%
2021	3,390	+24.0%
2023	3,647	+7.6%
Source: ISTAT
