= Menasalbas =

Coordinates: 39°38′N 4°17′W

- municipality
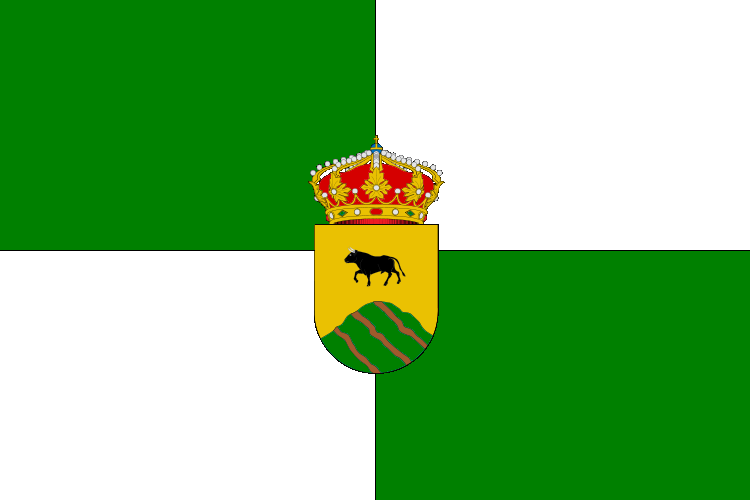
- Flag Coat of arms
- Interactive map of Menasalbas
- Country: Spain
- Autonomous community: Castile-La Mancha
- Province: Toledo
- Municipality: Menasalbas

Area
  - Total: 179 km^{2} (69 sq mi)
- Elevation: 702 m (2,303 ft)

Population (2025-01-01)
  - Total: 2,465
  - Density: 13.8/km^{2} (35.7/sq mi)
- Time zone: UTC+1 (CET)
  - Summer (DST): UTC+2 (CEST)

Menasalbas is a municipality located in the province of Toledo, Castile-La Mancha, Spain. According to the 2006 census (INE), the municipality has a population of 3206 inhabitants.

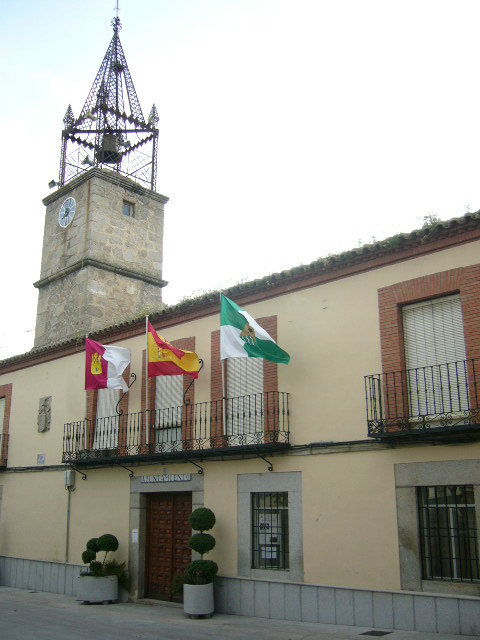
Town Hall of Menasalbas
