= Villaminaya =

- Municipality
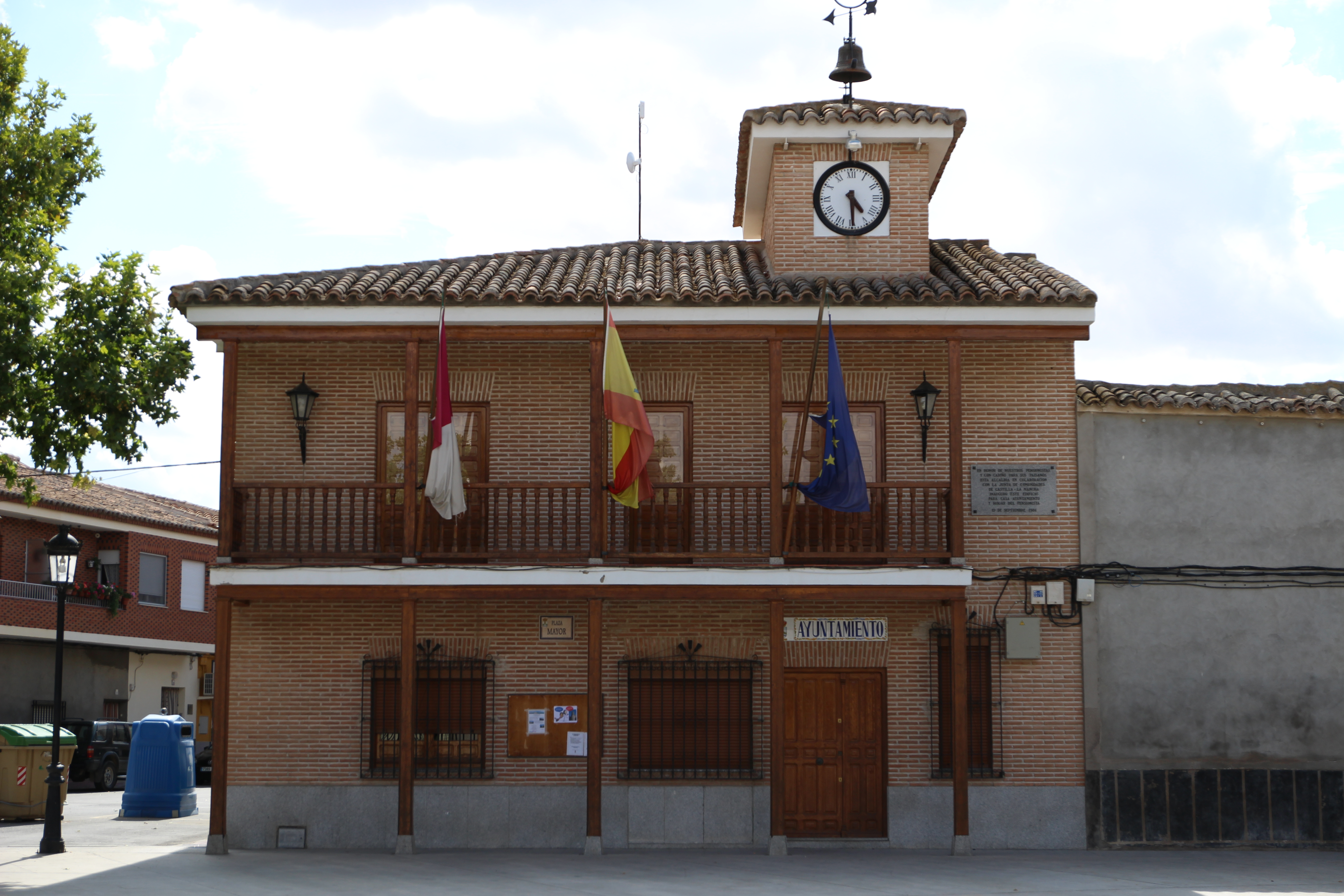

- Coat of arms

- Location in Spain
- Coordinates: 39°43′N 3°52′W
- Country: Spain
- Autonomous community: Castile-La Mancha
- Province: Toledo
- Municipality: Villaminaya

Area
  - Total: 21 km^{2} (8.1 sq mi)
- Elevation: 730 m (2,400 ft)

Population (2025-01-01)
  - Total: 518
  - Density: 25/km^{2} (64/sq mi)
- Time zone: UTC+1 (CET)
  - Summer (DST): UTC+2 (CEST)

Villaminaya is a municipality located in the province of Toledo, Castile-La Mancha, Spain. According to the 2006 census (INE), the municipality has a population of 586 inhabitants.
