= Totanés =

Coordinates: 39°43′N 4°13′W

- municipality
- Flag Coat of arms
- Interactive map of Totanés
- Country: Spain
- Autonomous community: Castile-La Mancha
- Province: Toledo
- Municipality: Totanés

Area
  - Total: 26.04 km^{2} (10.05 sq mi)
- Elevation: 730 m (2,400 ft)

Population (2025-01-01)
  - Total: 361
  - Density: 13.9/km^{2} (35.9/sq mi)
- Time zone: UTC+1 (CET)
  - Summer (DST): UTC+2 (CEST)

Totanés is a municipality located in the province of Toledo, Castile-La Mancha, Spain. According to the 2006 census (INE), the municipality had a population of 417 inhabitants.

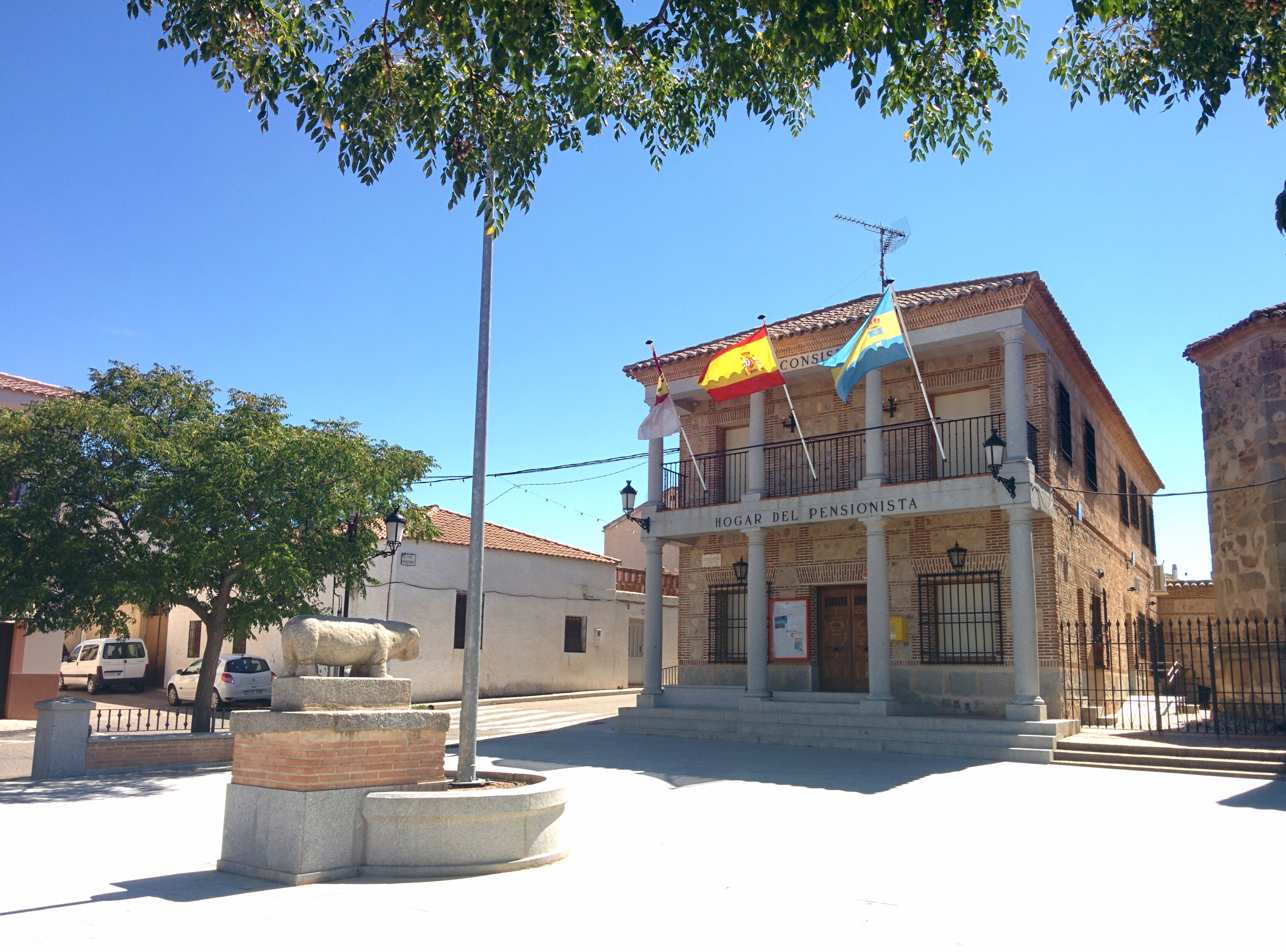
Town Hall of Totanés

== Demographics ==
Historical population
Year	Pop.	±%
1900	458	—
1910	530	+15.7%
1920	629	+18.7%
1930	628	−0.2%
1940	595	−5.3%
1950	624	+4.9%
1960	562	−9.9%
1970	403	−28.3%
1981	363	−9.9%
1991	381	+5.0%
2001	375	−1.6%
2011	425	+13.3%
2021	346	−18.6%
2023	350	+1.2%
Source: INE
