= Cuerva =

Coordinates: 39.664°N 4.212°W

- municipality
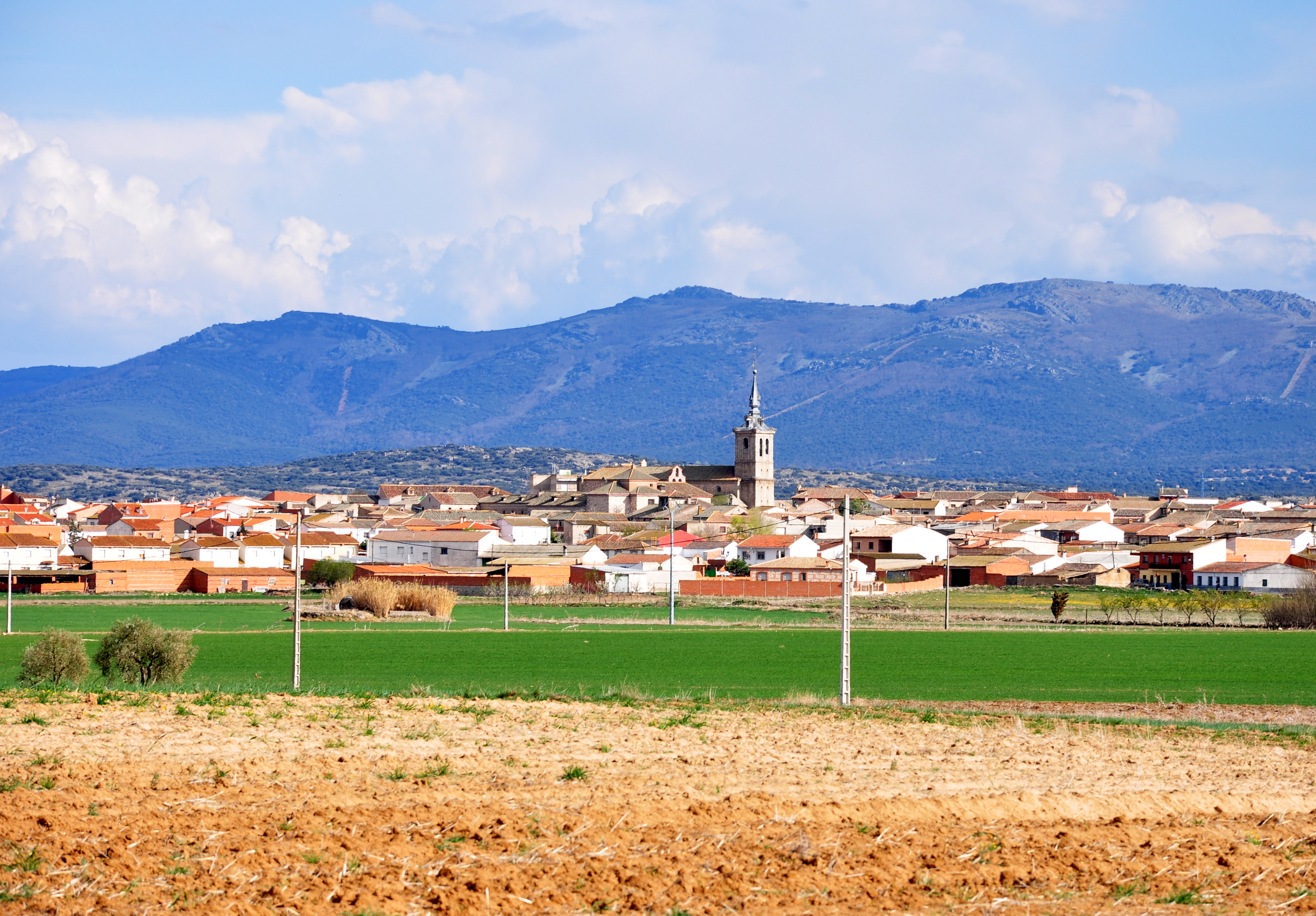

- Flag Coat of arms

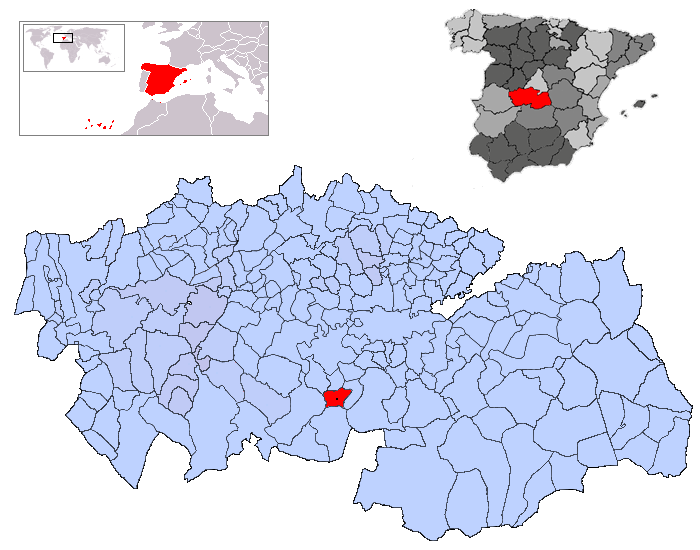
- Country: Spain
- Autonomous community: Castile-La Mancha
- Province: Toledo
- Municipality: Cuerva

Area
  - Total: 38 km^{2} (15 sq mi)
- Elevation: 714 m (2,343 ft)

Population (2025-01-01)
  - Total: 1,226
  - Density: 32/km^{2} (84/sq mi)
- Time zone: UTC+1 (CET)
  - Summer (DST): UTC+2 (CEST)

Cuerva is a municipality located in the province of Toledo, Castilla–La Mancha, Spain. According to the 2006 census (INE), the municipality has a population of 1421 inhabitants.

== Demographics ==
Historical population
Year	Pop.	±%
1900	1,450	—
1910	1,620	+11.7%
1920	1,832	+13.1%
1930	2,136	+16.6%
1940	1,870	−12.5%
1950	2,098	+12.2%
1960	1,908	−9.1%
1970	1,378	−27.8%
1981	1,244	−9.7%
1991	1,193	−4.1%
2001	1,297	+8.7%
2011	1,605	+23.7%
2021	1,277	−20.4%
2023	1,264	−1.0%
Source: INE
