= Nambroca =

- municipality
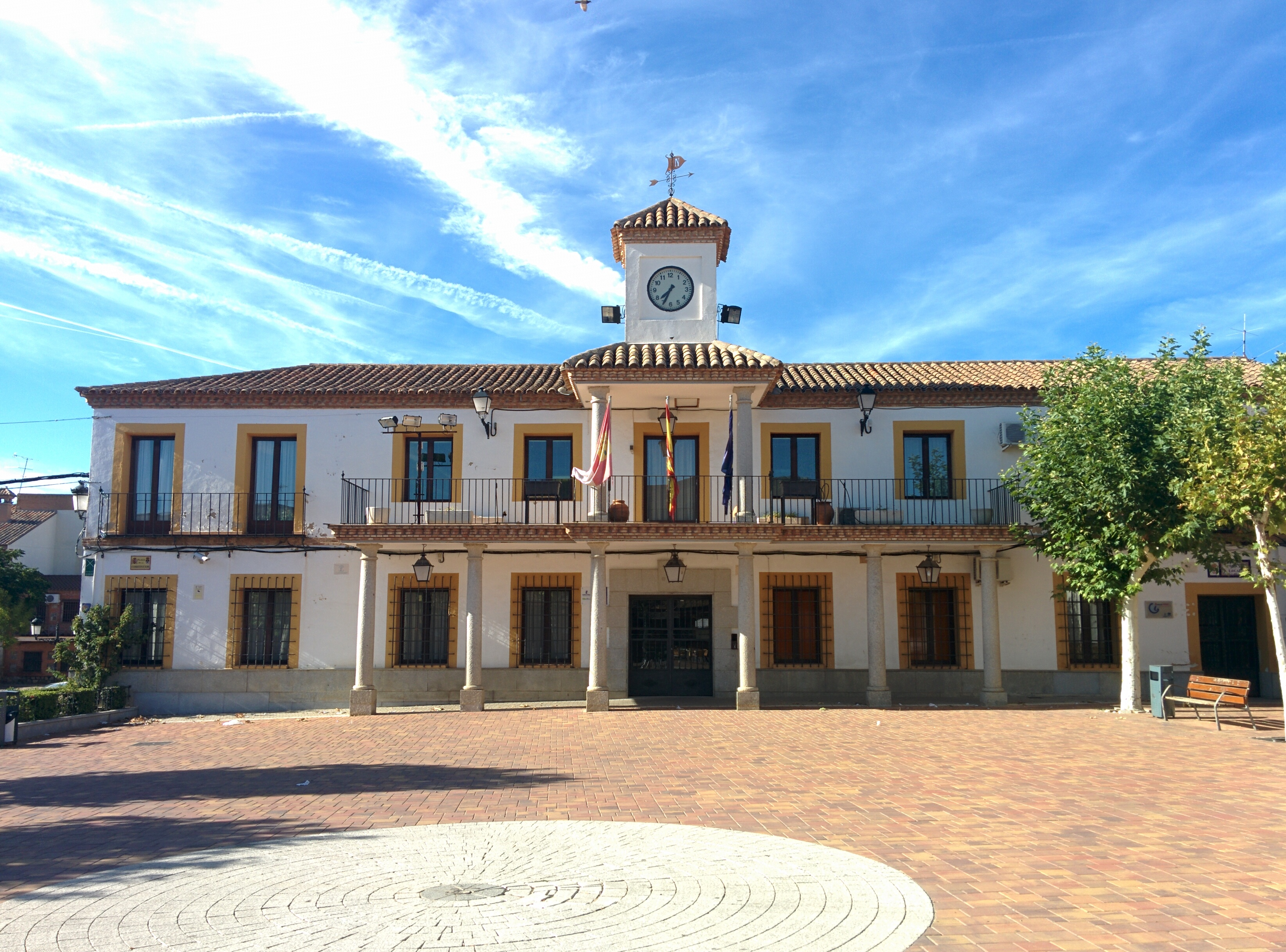
- Town hall

- Coat of arms

- Location in Spain
- Coordinates: 39°47′40″N 3°56′34″W
- Country: Spain
- Autonomous community: Castile-La Mancha
- Province: Toledo
- Comarca: Montes de Toledo

Government
  - Mayor: Román López Pérez

Area
  - Total: 82 km^{2} (32 sq mi)
- Elevation: 672 m (2,205 ft)

Population (2025-01-01)
  - Total: 5,263
  - Density: 64/km^{2} (170/sq mi)
- Demonym: Nambroqueños
- Time zone: UTC+1 (CET)
  - Summer (DST): UTC+2 (CEST)
- Website: Official website

Nambroca is a municipality located in the province of Toledo, Castile-La Mancha, Spain.
