= Layos =

Coordinates: 39°46′N 4°03′W

- municipality
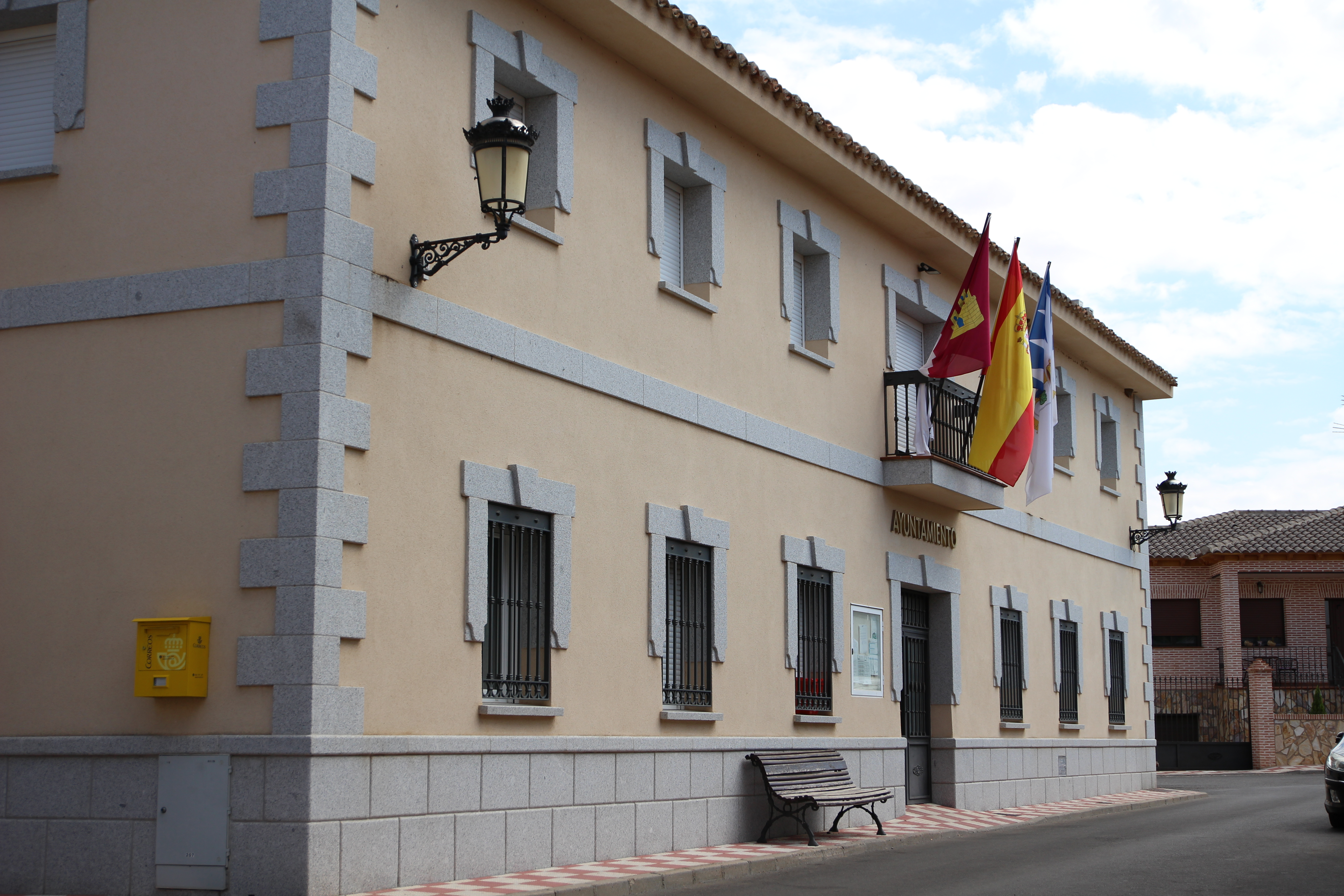
- Layos Town Hall Building

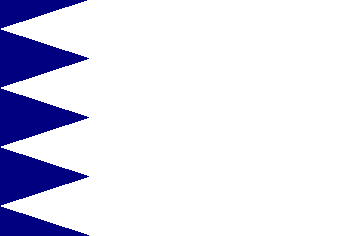
- Flag Coat of arms
- Interactive map of Layos
- Country: Spain
- Autonomous community: Castile-La Mancha
- Province: Toledo
- Municipality: Layos

Area
  - Total: 19 km^{2} (7.3 sq mi)
- Elevation: 651 m (2,136 ft)

Population (2025-01-01)
  - Total: 931
  - Density: 49/km^{2} (130/sq mi)
- Time zone: UTC+1 (CET)
  - Summer (DST): UTC+2 (CEST)

Layos is a municipality located in the province of Toledo, Castile-La Mancha, Spain. According to the 2006 census (INE), the municipality has a population of 378 inhabitants. In Layos in 1627 it was found the paleochristian sarcophagus named Layos Sarcophagus.
