= Gálvez, Toledo =

Village in Spain

Coordinates: 39°42′N 4°16′W

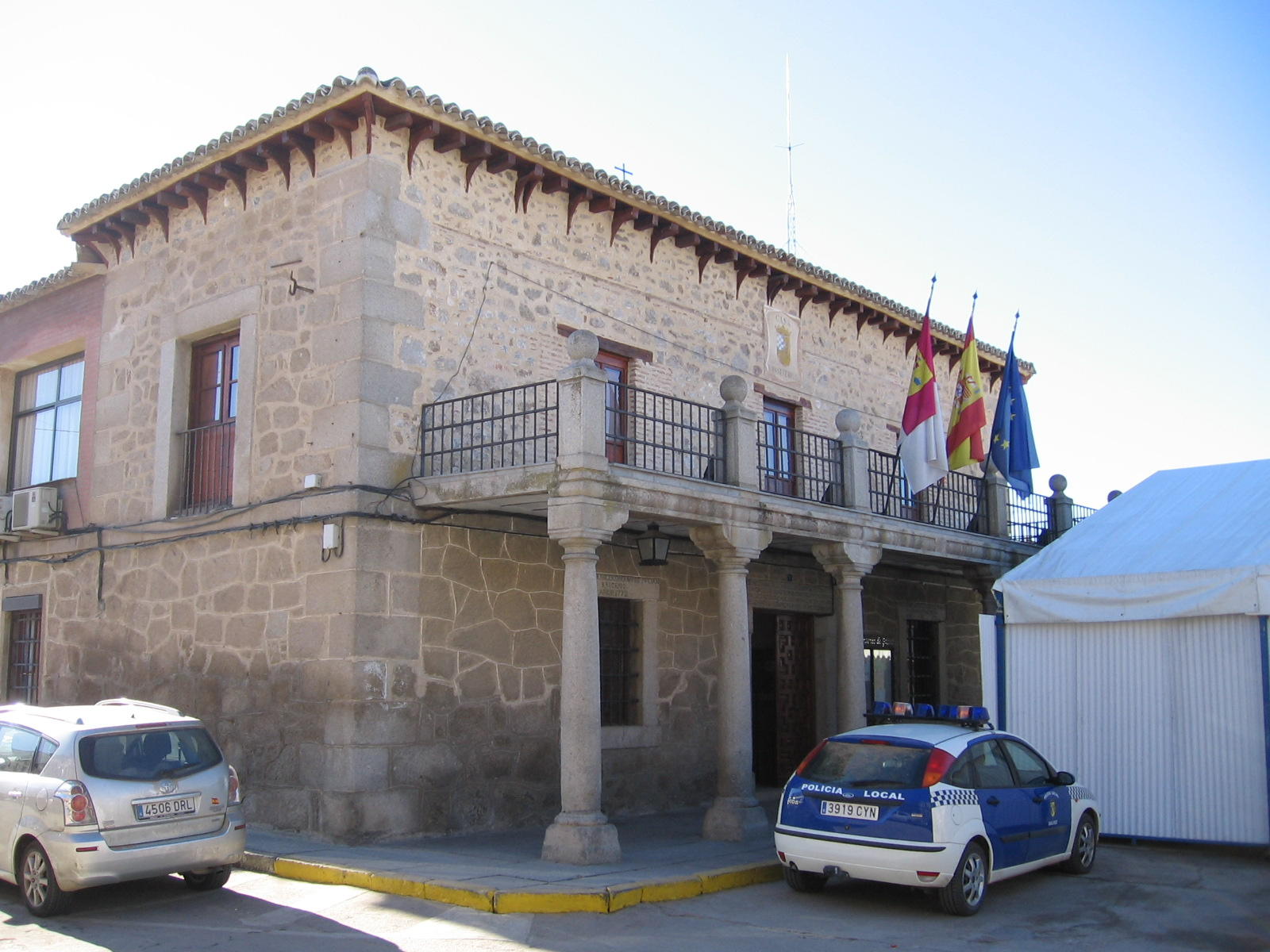
Town hall of Gálvez,Toledo

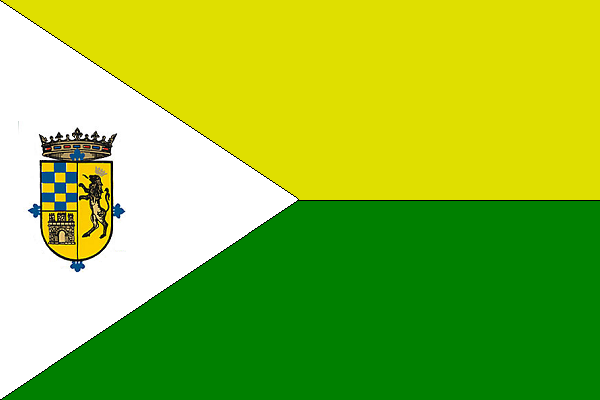
Flag of Gálvez, Toledo

Coat of arms of Gálvez, Toledo

Gálvez is a village in the province of Toledo and autonomous community of Castile-La Mancha, Spain.
