= Mazarambroz =

Coordinates: 39°42′N 4°02′W

- municipality
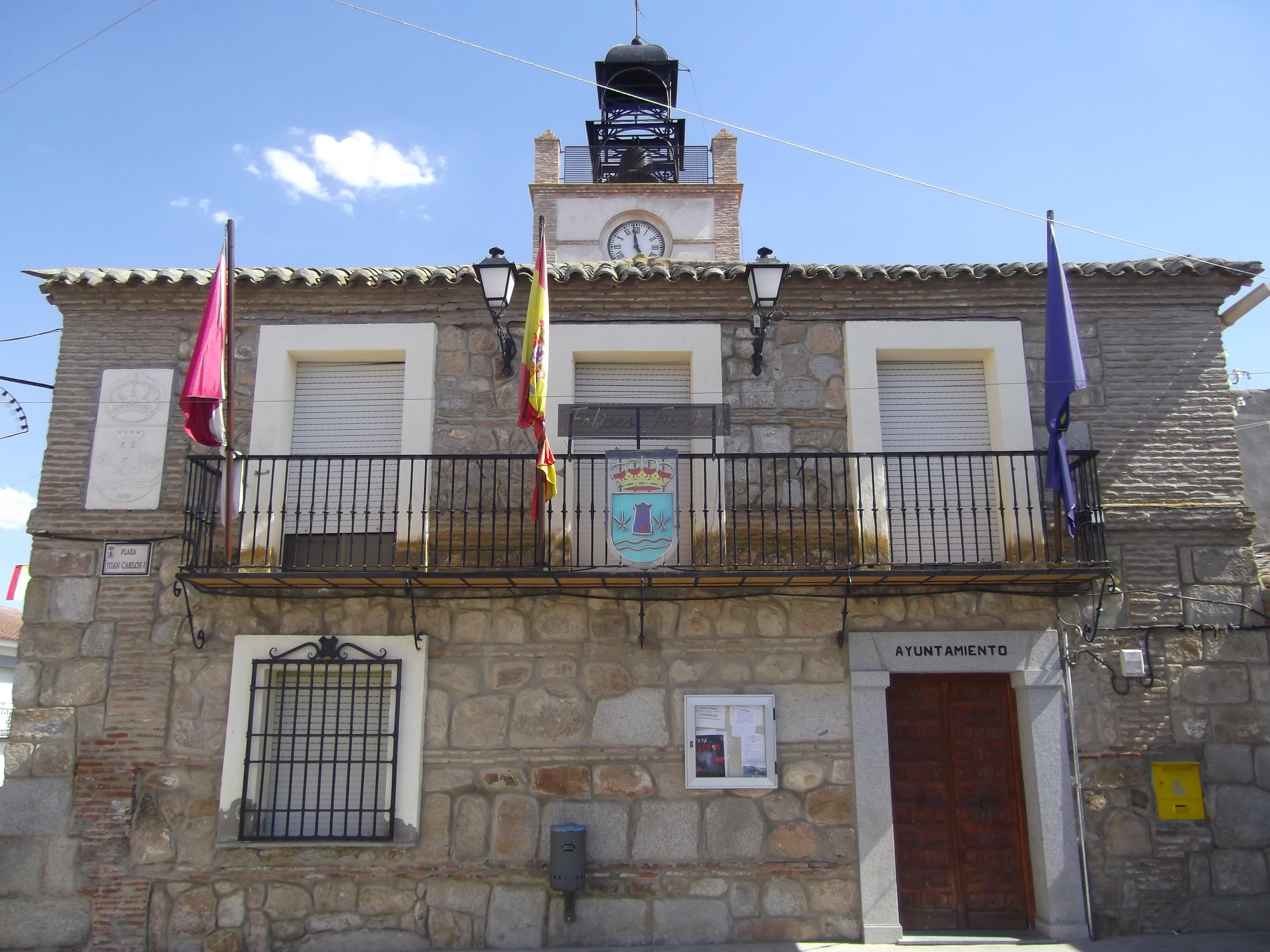
- Town hall of Mazarambroz

- Coat of arms
- Interactive map of Mazarambroz
- Country: Spain
- Autonomous community: Castile-La Mancha
- Province: Toledo
- Municipality: Mazarambroz

Area
  - Total: 22 km^{2} (8.5 sq mi)
- Elevation: 775 m (2,543 ft)

Population (2025-01-01)
  - Total: 1,251
  - Density: 57/km^{2} (150/sq mi)
- Time zone: UTC+1 (CET)
  - Summer (DST): UTC+2 (CEST)

Mazarambroz is a municipality located in the province of Toledo, Castile-La Mancha, Spain. According to the 2006 census (INE), the municipality has a population of 1314 inhabitants.

== History ==
In Roman times there was a reservoir supplying the city of Toledo via an aqueduct. There are some remains of the dam, in the limits with Sonseca.

== Ecology ==
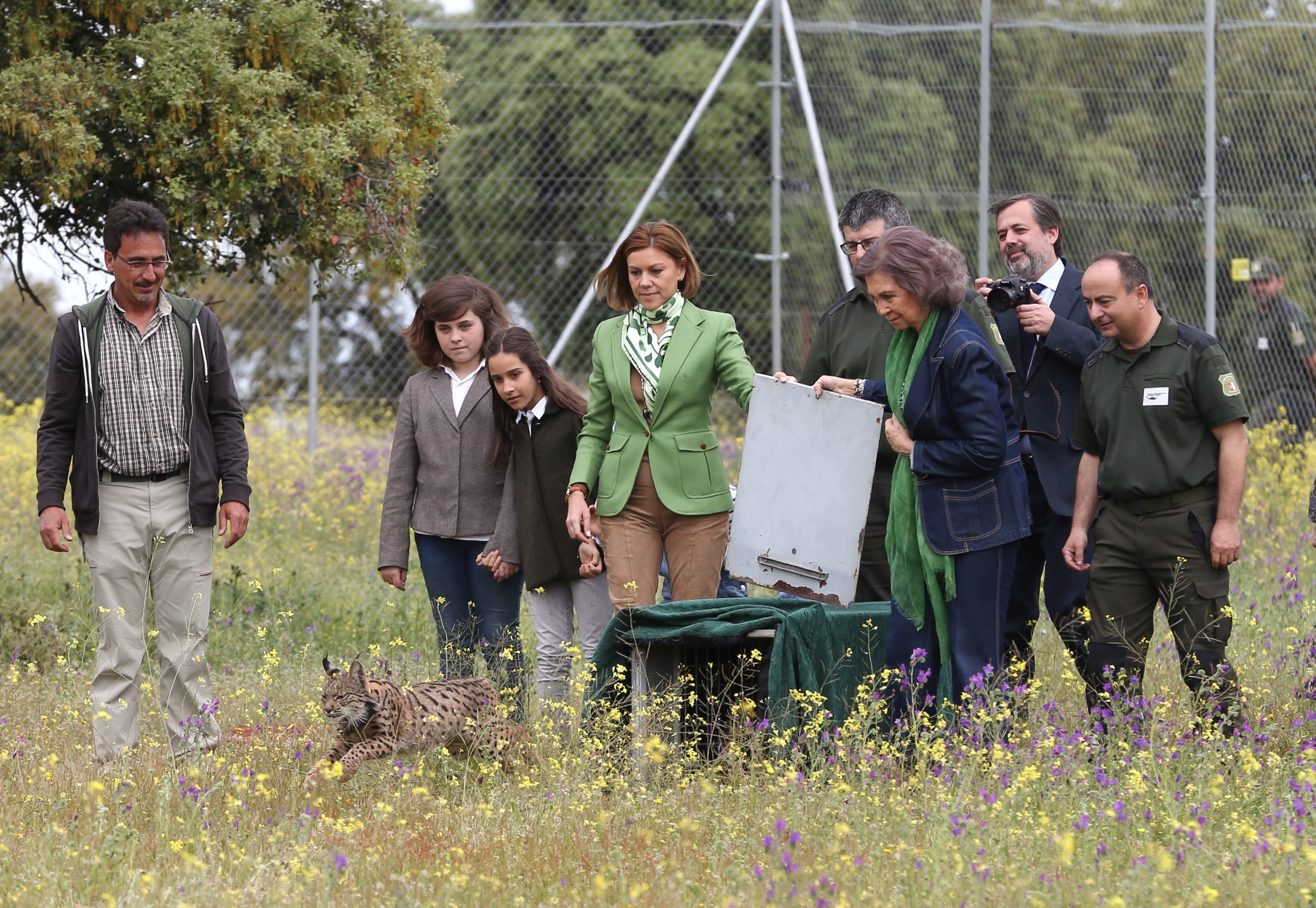
Release of lynxes in 2015 by Queen Sofia and María Dolores de Cospedal, President of Castilla-La Mancha.

It is one of the areas in the Montes de Toledo where the Iberian lynx has been reintroduced.

== See also ==
- Alcantarilla Dam
