= La Jara (comarca) =

Coordinates: 39°40′N 4°38′W

- Comarca
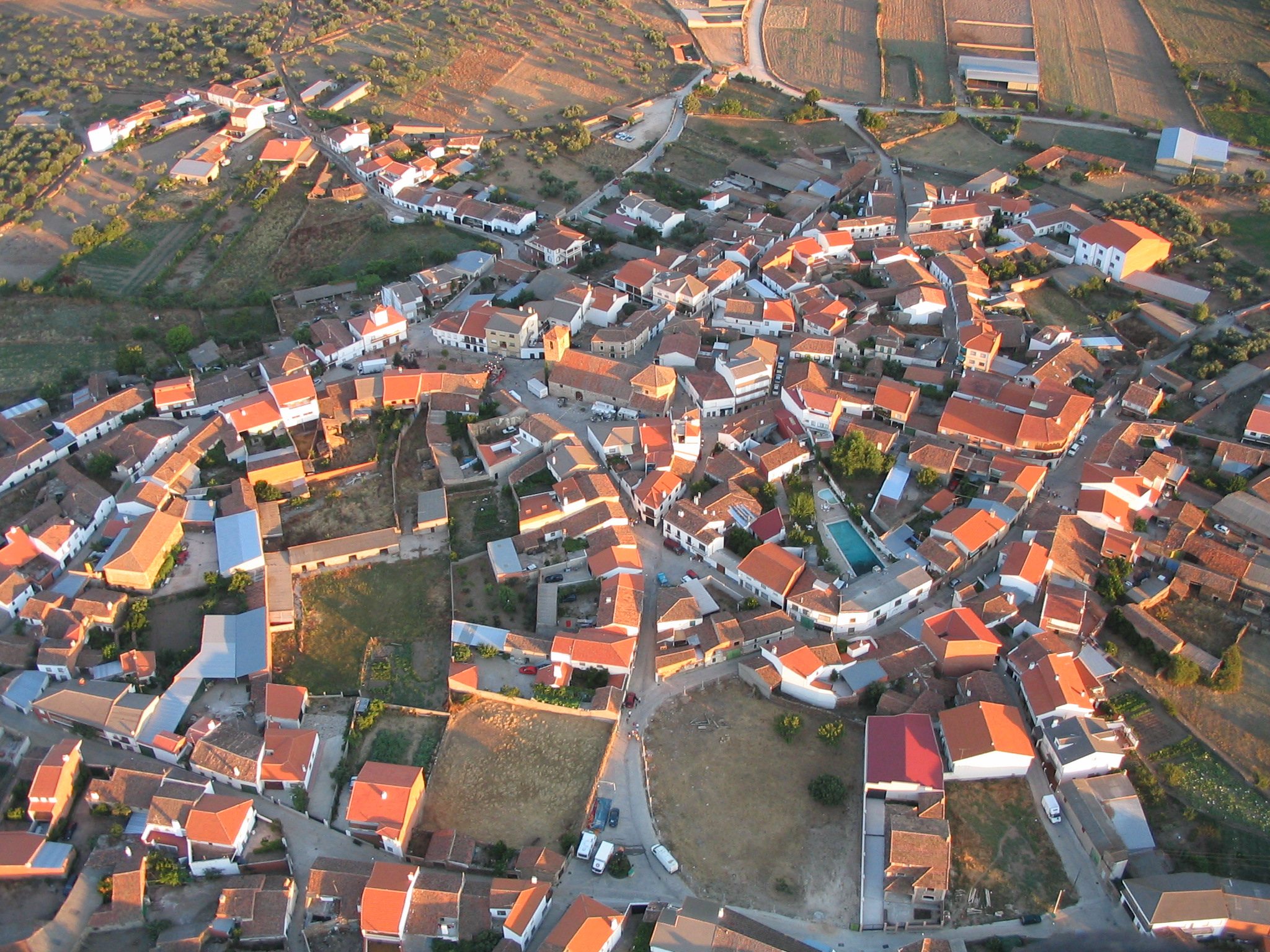
- Aerial view of Mohedas de la Jara

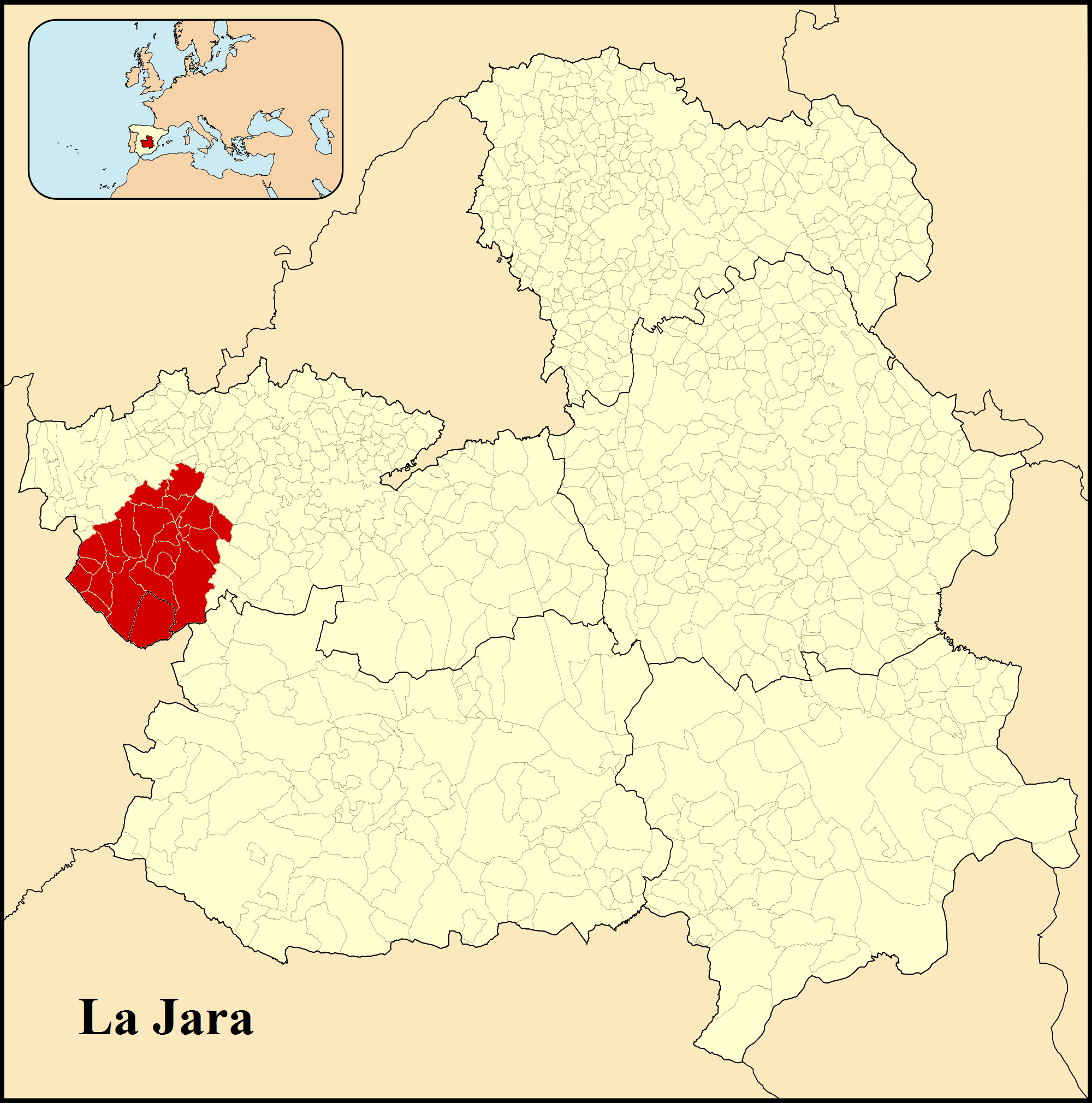
- Location of La Jara in Castile-La Mancha
- Country: Spain
- Autonomous community: Castile-La Mancha
- Province: Toledo, Ciudad Real
- Capital: Los Navalucillos
- Municipalities: List: See text

Area
  - Total: 2,166 km^{2} (836 sq mi)
- Elevation: 760 m (2,490 ft)

Population
  - Total: 19,470
  - Density: 8.989/km^{2} (23.28/sq mi)
- Time zone: UTC+1 (CET)
  - Summer (DST): UTC+2 (CEST)
- Largest municipality: Los Navalucillos

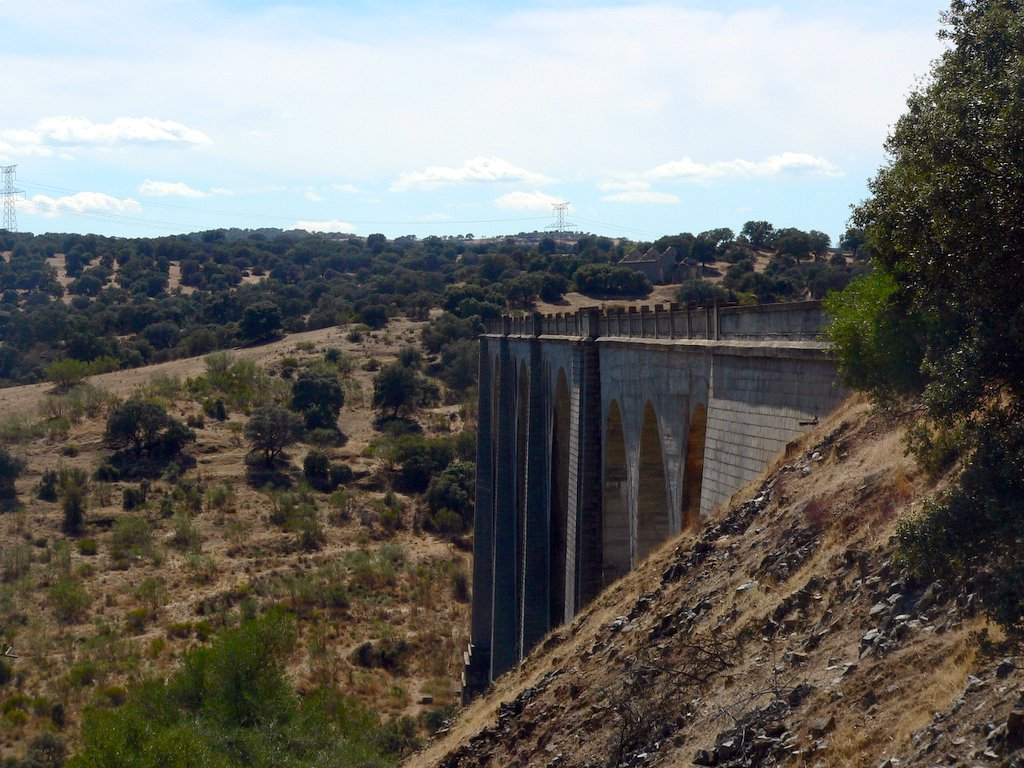
Vía Verde de La Jara.

La Jara is a comarca located in the Montes de Toledo, at the western end of Toledo Province. It also includes the municipality of Anchuras, an enclave of the province of Ciudad Real, in Castile-La Mancha, Spain. Despite being outside the comarca, the city of Talavera de la Reina holds significant importance for the people of La Jara due to historical ties.

This comarca has been traditionally a place of cattle rearers, with some honey production as well. Nowadays the economy has diversified and the comarca has suffered significant population loss.

The Vía Verde de La Jara is an abandoned railway line that has been converted into a path for hikers.

== Municipal terms and villages ==
=== Province of Toledo ===
- Alcaudete de la Jara
- Aldeanueva de Barbarroya
- Aldeanueva de San Bartolomé
- Belvís de la Jara
- El Campillo de la Jara
- Espinoso del Rey
- La Estrella
  - Fuentes
- Las Herencias
  - El Membrillo
- Mohedas de la Jara
- La Nava de Ricomalillo
- Los Navalmorales
- Los Navalucillos
  - Los Alares
  - Robledo del Buey
  - Valdeazores
- La Pueblanueva
- Puerto de San Vicente
- Retamoso de la Jara
- Robledo del Mazo
  - Las Hunfrías
  - Navaltoril
  - Piedraescrita
  - Robledillo
- San Bartolomé de las Abiertas
- San Martín de Pusa
- Santa Ana de Pusa
- Sevilleja de la Jara
  - Buenasbodas
  - Gargantillas
  - Minas de Santa Quiteria
  - Puerto del Rey
- Torrecilla de la Jara
  - La Fresneda de la Jara
- Villarejo de Montalbán

=== Province of Ciudad Real ===
- Anchuras
  - Encinacaída
  - Enjambre
  - Las Huertas
  - Gamonoso

== See also ==
- Montes de Toledo
