= Anchuras =

- Municipality
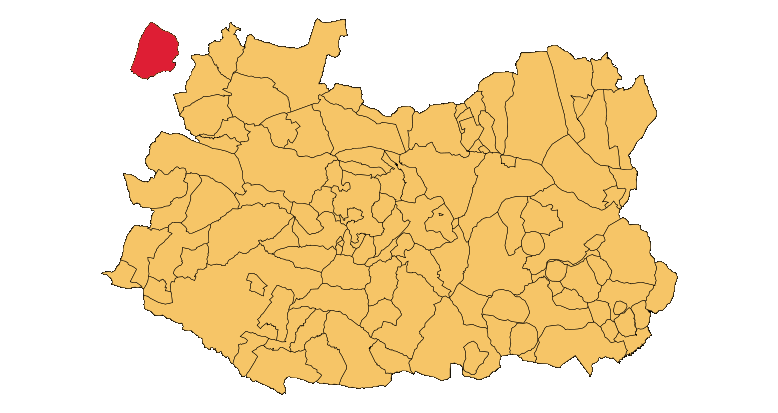
- Ciudad Real Province with the enclave of Anchuras on the west

- Coat of arms

- Location in Spain
- Coordinates: 39°29′N 4°50′W
- Country: Spain
- Autonomous community: Castile-La Mancha
- Province: Ciudad Real
- Comarca: La Jara

Government
  - Alcalde (mayor): Santiago Martín Campos (2019) (PSOE)

Area
  - Total: 231.05 km^{2} (89.21 sq mi)
- Elevation: 560 m (1,840 ft)

Population (2025-01-01)
  - Total: 267
  - Density: 1.16/km^{2} (2.99/sq mi)
- Demonym: Anchureño/a
- Time zone: UTC+1 (CET)
  - Summer (DST): UTC+2 (CEST)
- Postal code: 13117

Anchuras (also known as Rincón de Anchuras) is a municipality in Ciudad Real Province, Castile-La Mancha, Spain. It has a population of 342. According to the 2014 census, Anchuras municipality has a population of 202 inhabitants.

The municipality's territory is located in the Montes de Toledo and forms an enclave between Toledo Province and Badajoz Province.

== History ==
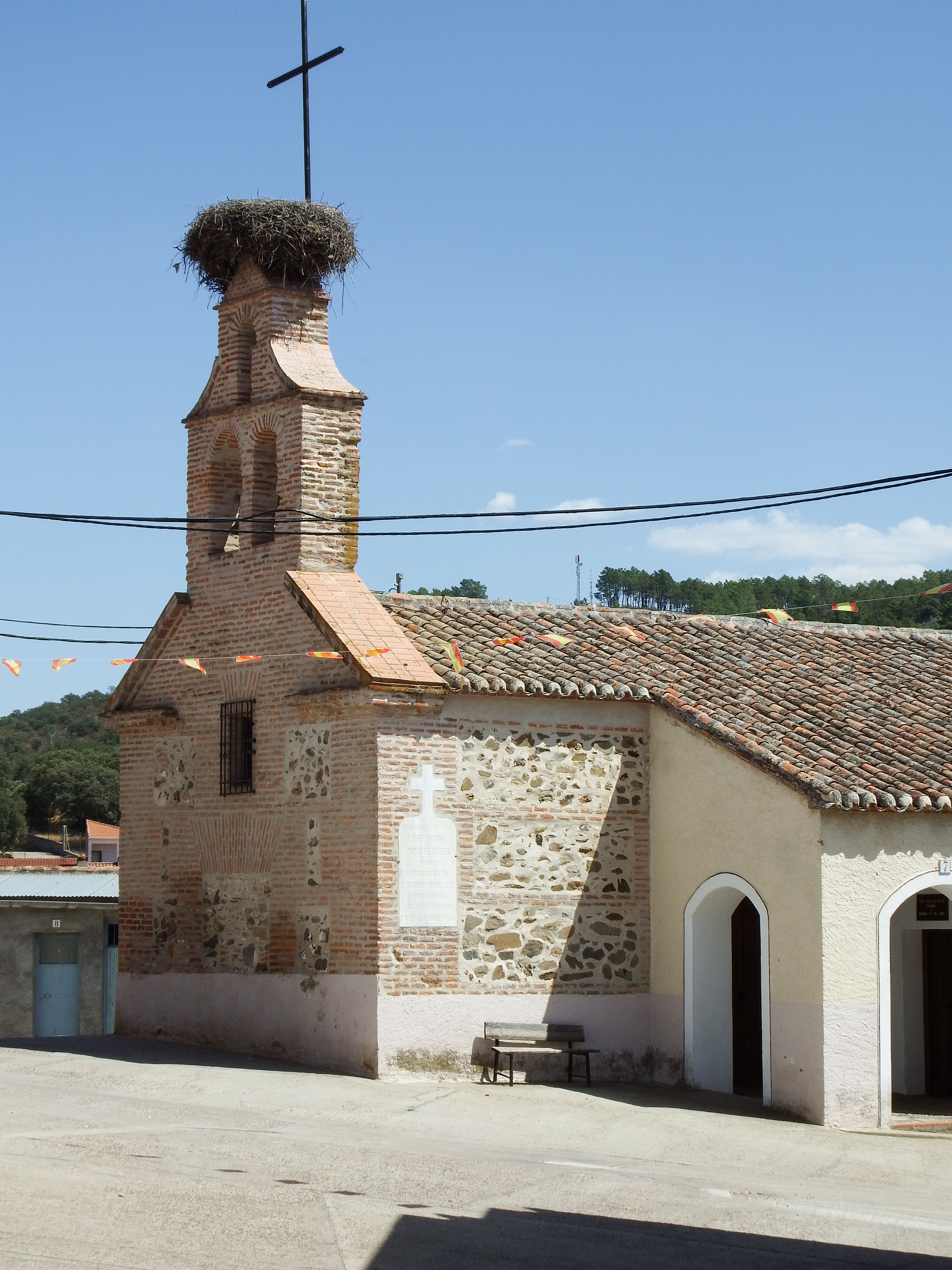
Church of Nuestra Señora de la Asunción

Currently we add "de los Montes", because it is integrated into the region of Los Montes (Ciudad Real), but this has not always been the case, because before it was called "Anchuras de la Jara", because it was included the southern lands of this region de La Jara, which were administered by Talavera de la Reina until well into the 16th century. At that time, the area that today is Anchuras formed part, at first, of the municipality of Sevilleja as a hamlet, until the Supreme Council of Castilla declared the territory of Anchuras an independent municipality in 1785.

There are no data that allow us to establish settlements in this area until the 14th century, being until now a territory totally covered by mount. The first known settlement is that of beekeepers, who cultivate small fields of rye and raise herds of pigs to subsist. This first population slowly spread throughout the territory and thus in the 15th century the first concentration appears in a hamlet made up of huts that will be called La Nava de los Enjambres. At the end of the 16th century it consisted of about twenty huts and a small hermitage.

Anchuras itself did not appear as a population center until the middle of the 17th century, the first houses being located on a slope of the Pastuero hill. A small church was built on a small landing to house the Virgen del Gamonal, who was in a hermitage 2 km from the farmhouse. It is a single room covered with a wooden frame. In the materials used for its construction we can see the simplicity of this building. In 1676 the Archbishop of Toledo, Pascual Aragón, consecrated the church to Nuestra Señora de la Asunción, granting it the category of parish.

Anchuras became the religious, economic and communications center of the territory, surpassing the oldest one in Enjambre. At the beginning of the 17th century, 2.5 km from Anchuras, the hamlet of Encinacaída began to form, with houses made of slate and covered with broom and mud, near an oak that the wind bent without uprooting it and that gives its name to the farmhouse. Around 1879, 14 residents from Aldeanueva de San Bartolomé (Toledo) bought the pasture Gamonoso, built their houses on a hill and parceled out and distributed the pasture, from which they took the name of Gamonoso. Finally, at the end of the 19th century, a new hamlet was created in a hollow, Las Huertas del Sauceral, which owes its name to the exploitation of small orchards around a patch of willow trees.

Anchuras became a well-known municipality due to the decision of the national government to locate a training camp for the Air Force (firing range) on its lands and adjacent ones, specifically the one that had not been installed in Cabañeros. Thus, the Royal Decree of July 20, 1988 indicated Anchuras as a Zone of Interest for the Defense, for which reason an environmentalist, pacifist, partisan and neighborhood movement began against it that ended in 1996 with the repeal of said royal decree.

== Villages ==
- Anchuras, main population centre.
- Encinacaída
- Enjambre
- Las Huertas
- Gamonoso

== See also ==
- La Jara (comarca)
