= Las Herencias =

Coordinates: 39°52′N 4°55′W

- municipality
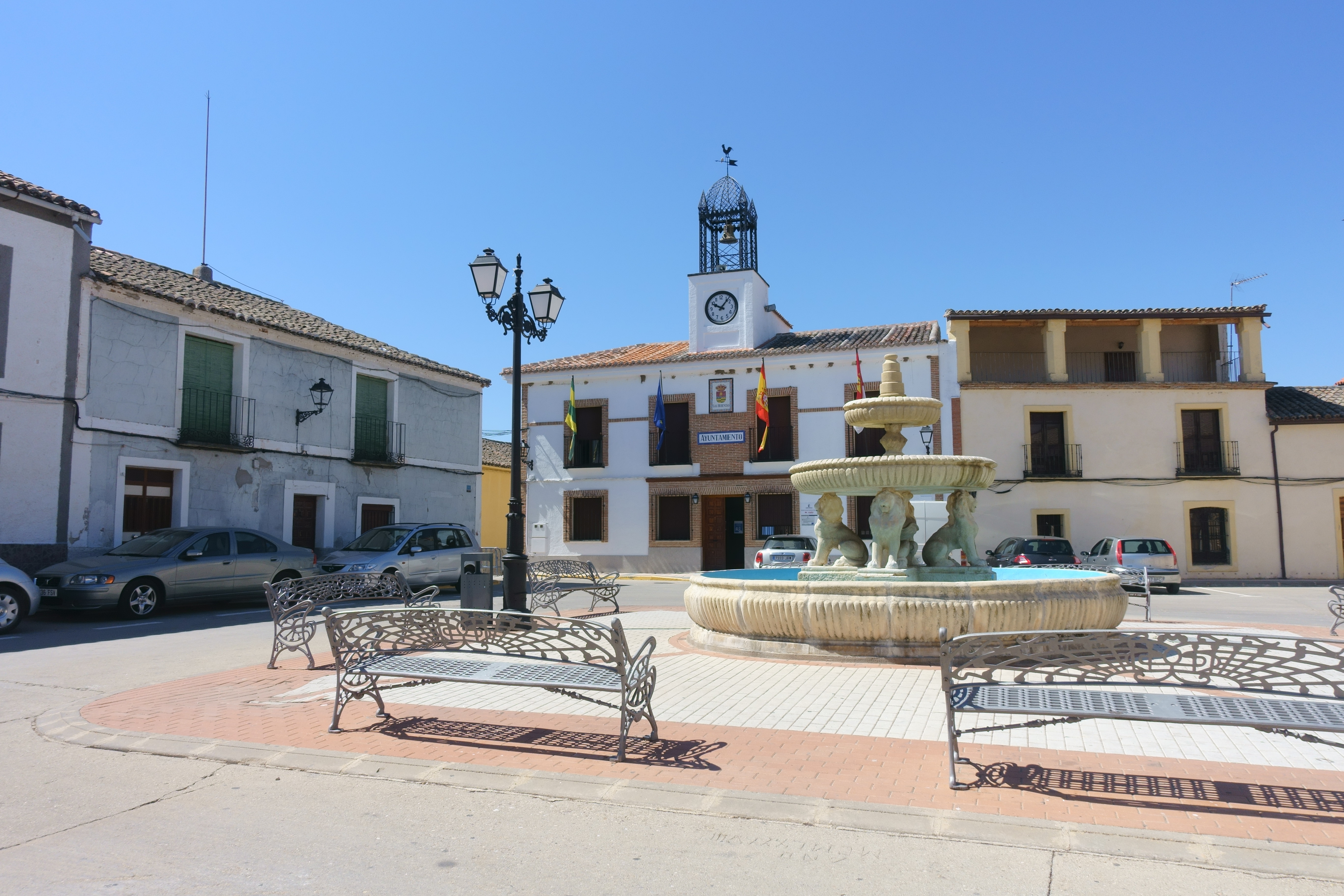

- Coat of arms
- Interactive map of Las Herencias
- Country: Spain
- Autonomous community: Castile-La Mancha
- Province: Toledo
- Municipality: Las Herencias

Area
  - Total: 91 km^{2} (35 sq mi)
- Elevation: 363 m (1,191 ft)

Population (2025-01-01)
  - Total: 821
  - Density: 9.0/km^{2} (23/sq mi)
- Time zone: UTC+1 (CET)
  - Summer (DST): UTC+2 (CEST)

Las Herencias is a municipality located in the province of Toledo, Castile-La Mancha, Spain. According to the 2006 census (INE), the municipality has a population of 759 inhabitants. . It adjoins the municipalities of Talavera de la Reina in the north, La Pueblanueva and San Bartolomé de las Abiertas at the east, Alcaudete de la Jara and Jara Belvís the south, and Calera y Chozas to the west, all of Toledo.

== Villages ==
- El Membrillo
