= Piedraescrita =

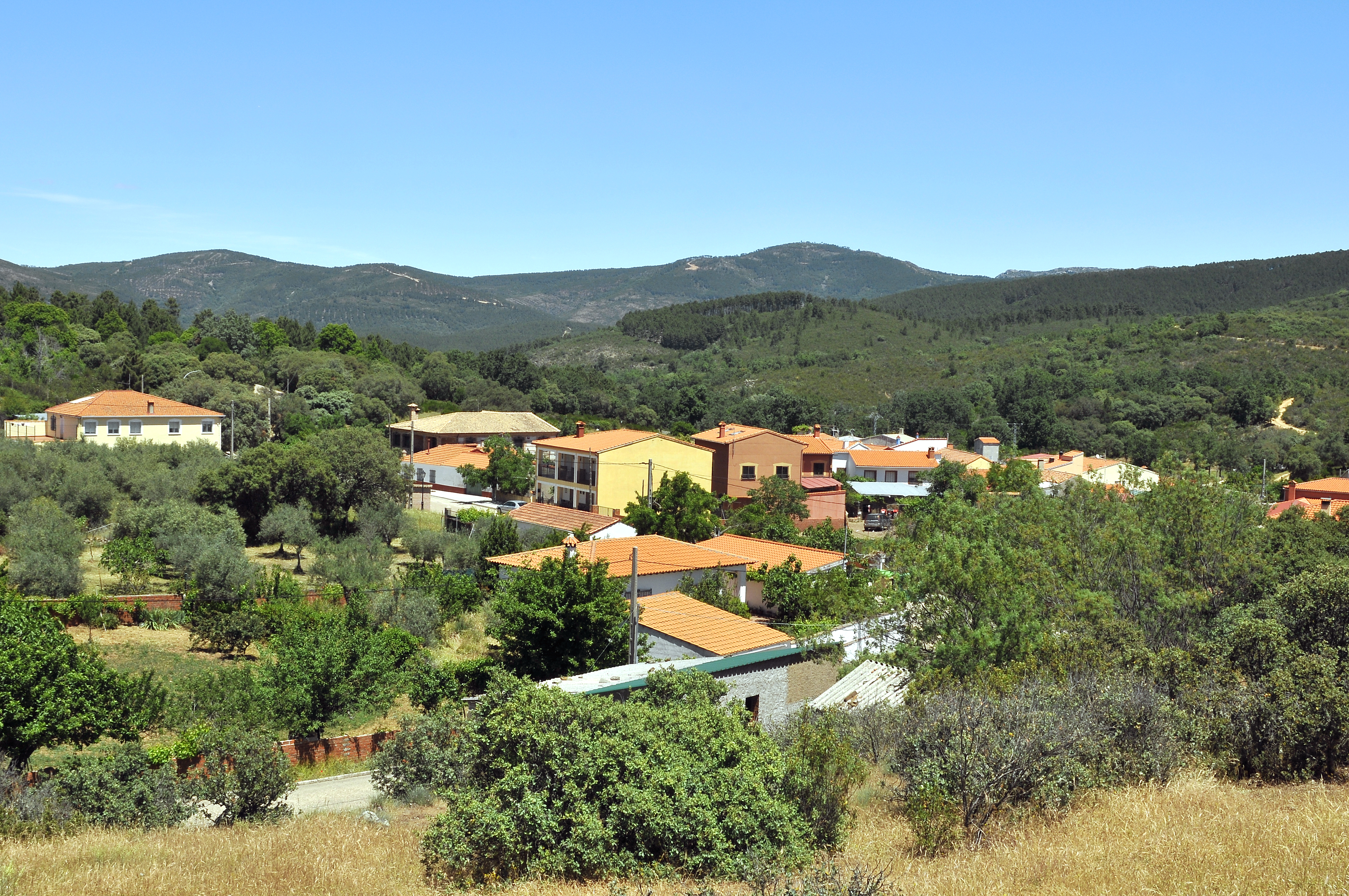
- Interactive map of Piedraescrita
- Location within Castilla-La Mancha
- Coordinates: 39°32′36″N 4°46′47″W
- Country: Spain
- Autonomous community: Castilla–La Mancha
- Province: Toledo
- Municipality: Robledo del Mazo
- Elevation: 900 m (3,000 ft)

Piedraescrita is a small village (pedanía) belonging to the Spanish municipality of Robledo del Mazo, in the province of Toledo. It lies in the Sierra de La Hiruela (a subrange of the Montes de Toledo) at around 900 metres above mean sea level, near the Puerto de Piedraescrita. The place coincides with the watershed between the Tagus and Guadiana river basins, near the source of the Gévalo, a tributary of the former. By the 18th century it had a population of 40. The rural church features panels of Talavera pottery.
