= Garciotum =

- Municipality
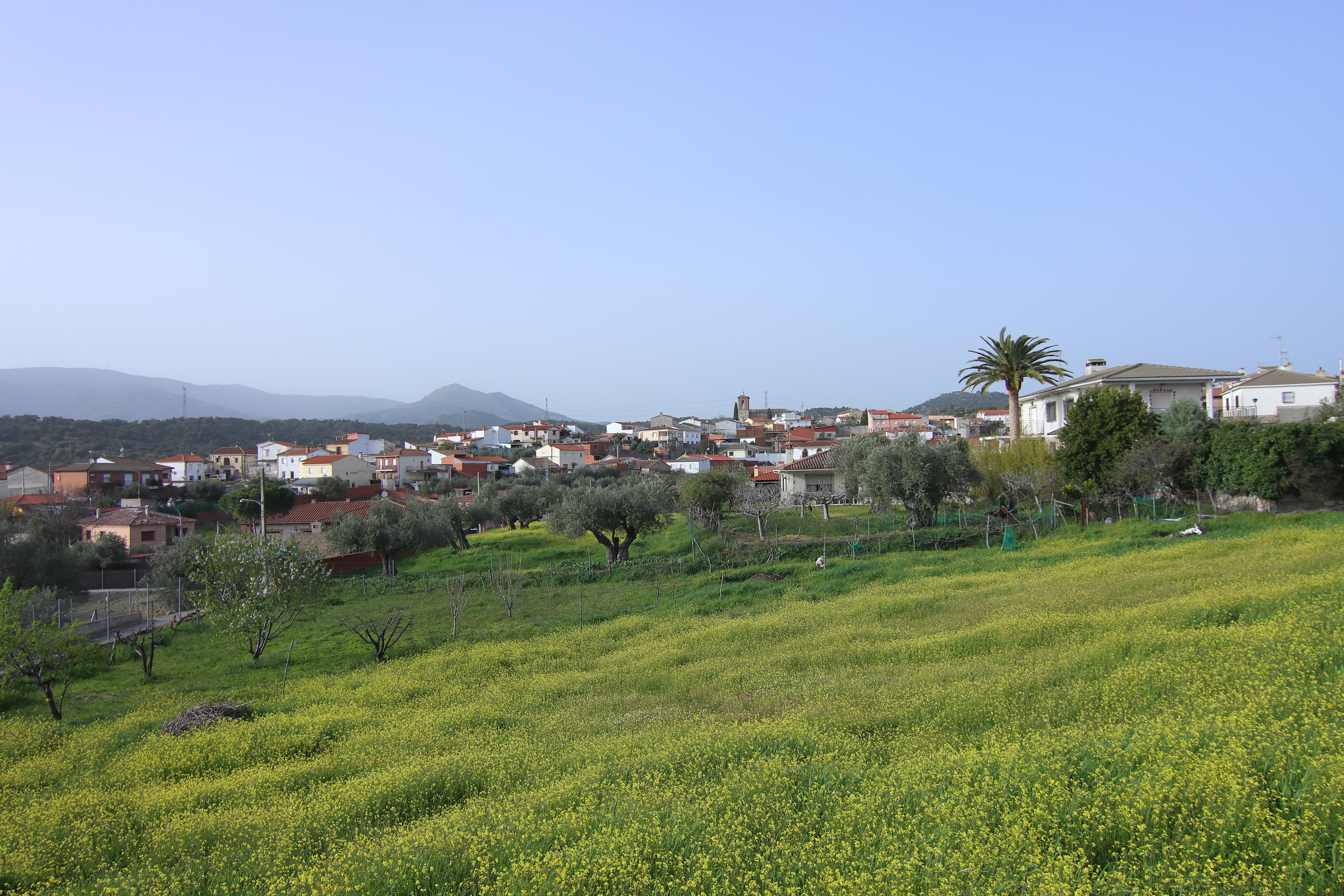

- Coat of arms

- Location within Castilla-La Mancha Location within Spain
- Coordinates: 40°5′49.2″N 4°38′45.6″W
- Country: Spain
- Autonomous community: Castile-La Mancha
- Province: Toledo

Area
  - Total: 22.73 km^{2} (8.78 sq mi)
- Elevation: 547 m (1,795 ft)

Population (2025-01-01)
  - Total: 220
  - Density: 9.7/km^{2} (25/sq mi)
- Time zone: UTC+1 (CET)
  - Summer (DST): UTC+2 (CEST)

Garciotum is a municipality of Spain located in the province of Toledo, Castilla–La Mancha. The municipality spans across a total area of 22.73 km^{2} and, as of 1 January 2023, it has a registered population of 215.

Prior to being granted township in 1663, Garciotum was a hamlet belonging to the land of Castillo de Bayuela.

== Demographics ==
Historical population
Year	Pop.	±%
1900	349	—
1910	421	+20.6%
1920	425	+1.0%
1930	449	+5.6%
1940	490	+9.1%
1950	505	+3.1%
1960	415	−17.8%
1970	234	−43.6%
1981	178	−23.9%
1991	140	−21.3%
2001	160	+14.3%
2011	171	+6.9%
2021	206	+20.5%
2023	215	+4.4%
Source:INE
