= Sevilleja de la Jara =

Coordinates: 39°34′N 4°57′W

Sevilleja de la Jara, Spain
- Coat of arms

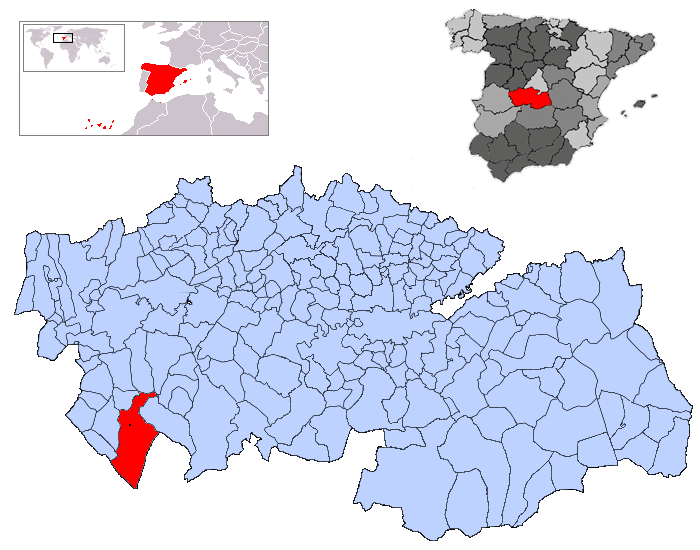
- Country: Spain
- Autonomous community: Castile-La Mancha
- Province: Toledo
- Comarca: La Jara

Area
  - Total: 234 km^{2} (90 sq mi)
- Elevation: 665 m (2,182 ft)

Population (2025-01-01)
  - Total: 635
  - Density: 2.71/km^{2} (7.03/sq mi)
- Time zone: UTC+1 (CET)
  - Summer (DST): UTC+2 (CEST)

Sevilleja de la Jara is a municipality located in the province of Toledo, Castile-La Mancha, Spain. According to the 2023 census (INE), the municipality has a population of 643 inhabitants.

== Villages ==
- Buenasbodas
- Gargantillas (Gargantilla de la Jara)
- Minas de Santa Quiteria
- Puerto del Rey (Puerto Rey)
