= Santa Ana de Pusa =

- Municipality
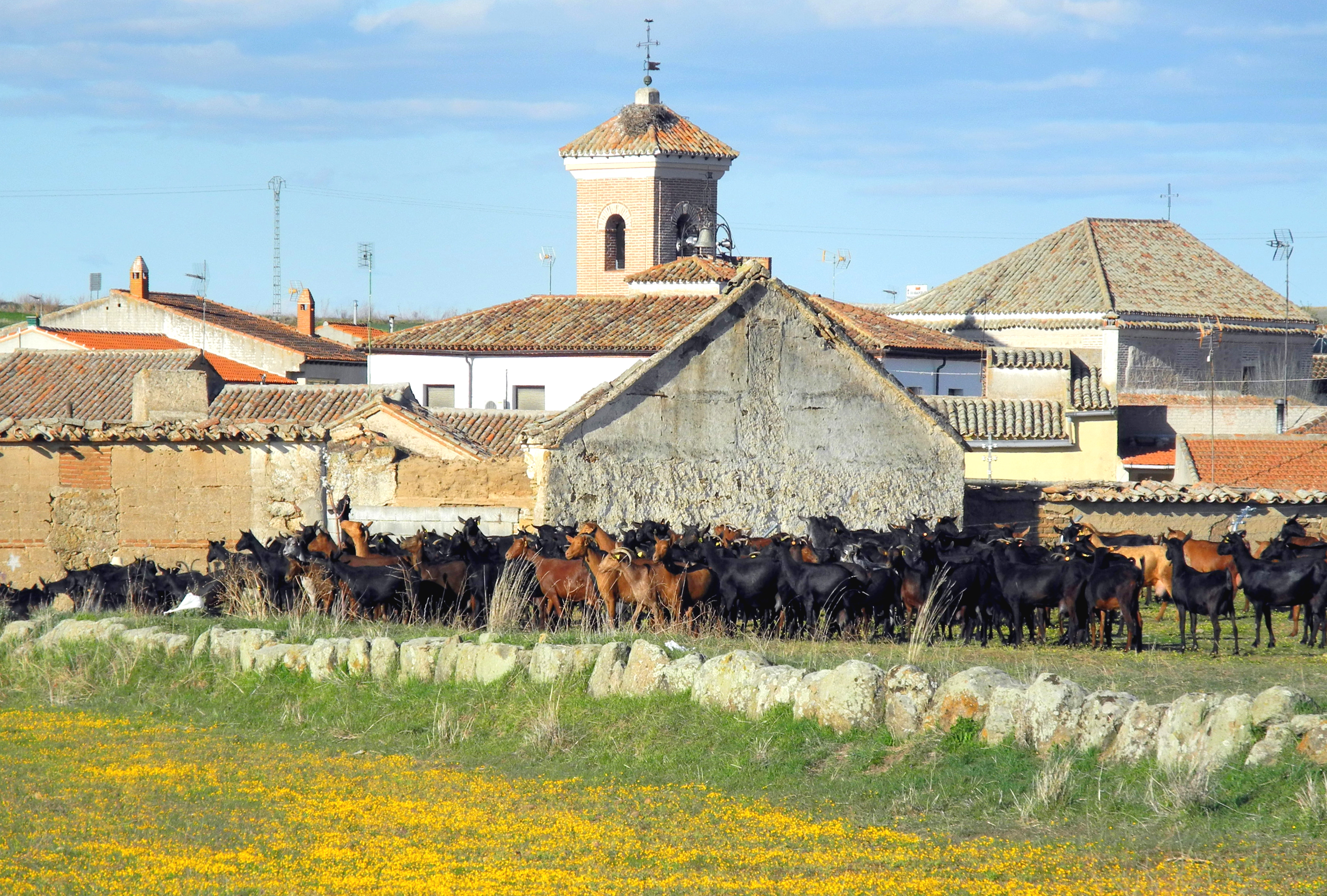

- Flag Coat of arms

- Location in Spain
- Coordinates: 39°45′49″N 4°42′57″W
- Country: Spain
- Community: Castilla-La Mancha
- Province: Toledo
- Comarca: La Jara

Area
  - Total: 19 km^{2} (7.3 sq mi)
- Elevation: 594 m (1,949 ft)

Population (2025-01-01)
  - Total: 345
  - Density: 18/km^{2} (47/sq mi)
- Time zone: UTC+1 (CET)
  - Summer (DST): UTC+2 (CEST)

Santa Ana de Pusa is a municipality located in the province of Toledo, Castile-La Mancha, Spain. According to the 2006 census (INE), the municipality has a population of 411 inhabitants.
