= Las Ventas de San Julián =

Coordinates: 40°00′N 5°17′W

Las Ventas de San Julián, Spain
- Flag Coat of arms
- Interactive map of Las Ventas de San Julián, Spain
- Country: Spain
- Autonomous community: Castile-La Mancha
- Province: Toledo
- Municipality: Las Ventas de San Julián

Area
  - Total: 6 km^{2} (2.3 sq mi)
- Elevation: 310 m (1,020 ft)

Population (2025-01-01)
  - Total: 239
  - Density: 40/km^{2} (100/sq mi)
- Time zone: UTC+1 (CET)
  - Summer (DST): UTC+2 (CEST)

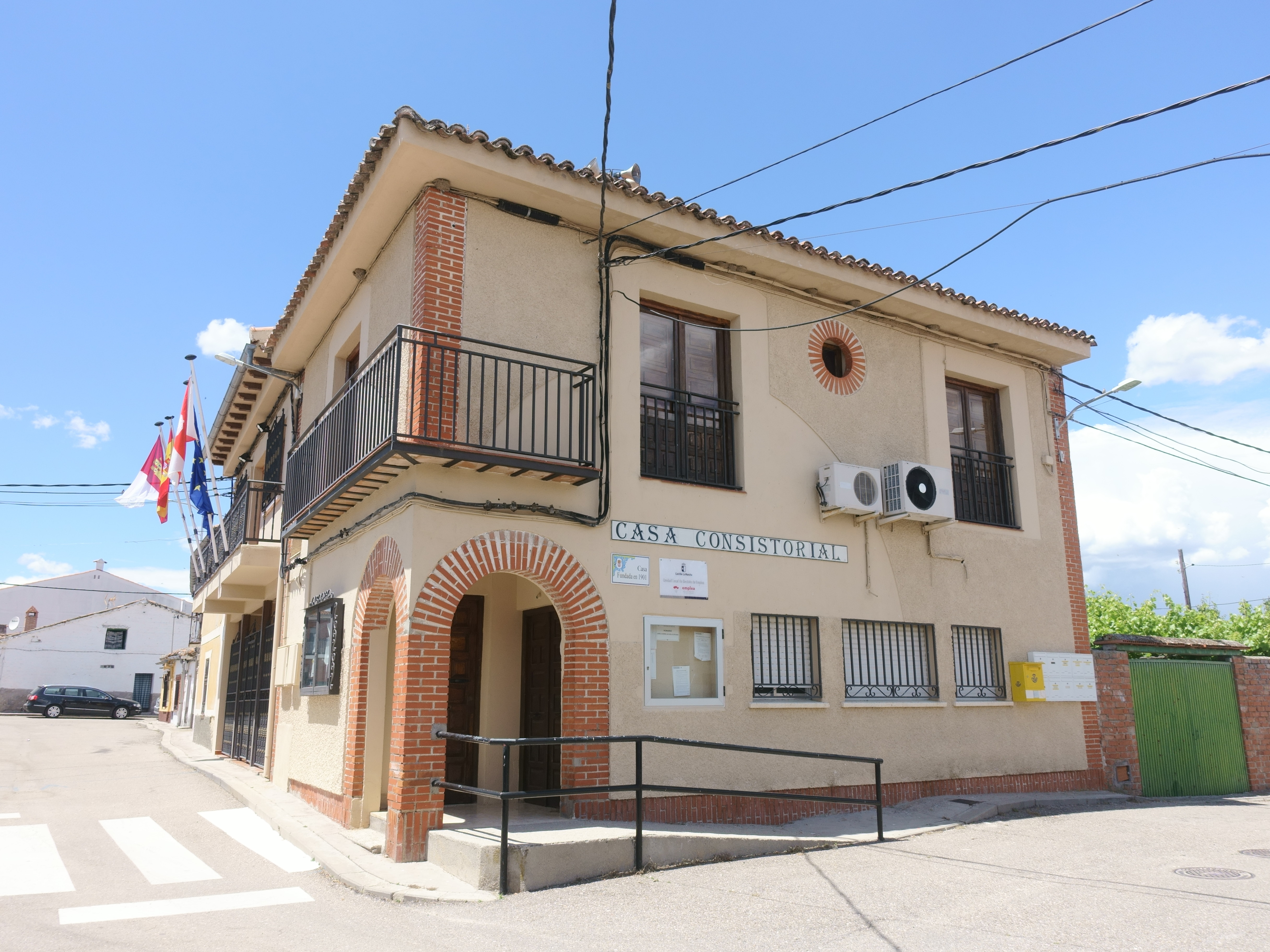
Las Ventas de San Julián

Las Ventas de San Julián is a municipality located in the province of Toledo, Castile-La Mancha, Spain. According to the 2006 census (INE), the municipality has a population of 233 inhabitants.

== Demographics ==
Historical population
Year	Pop.	±%
1900	130	—
1910	129	−0.8%
1920	152	+17.8%
1930	230	+51.3%
1940	280	+21.7%
1950	352	+25.7%
1960	459	+30.4%
1970	376	−18.1%
1981	269	−28.5%
1991	224	−16.7%
2001	234	+4.5%
2011	228	−2.6%
2021	233	+2.2%
2023	229	−1.7%
Source: INE
