= Torralba de Oropesa =

Coordinates: 39°56′N 5°09′W

- municipality
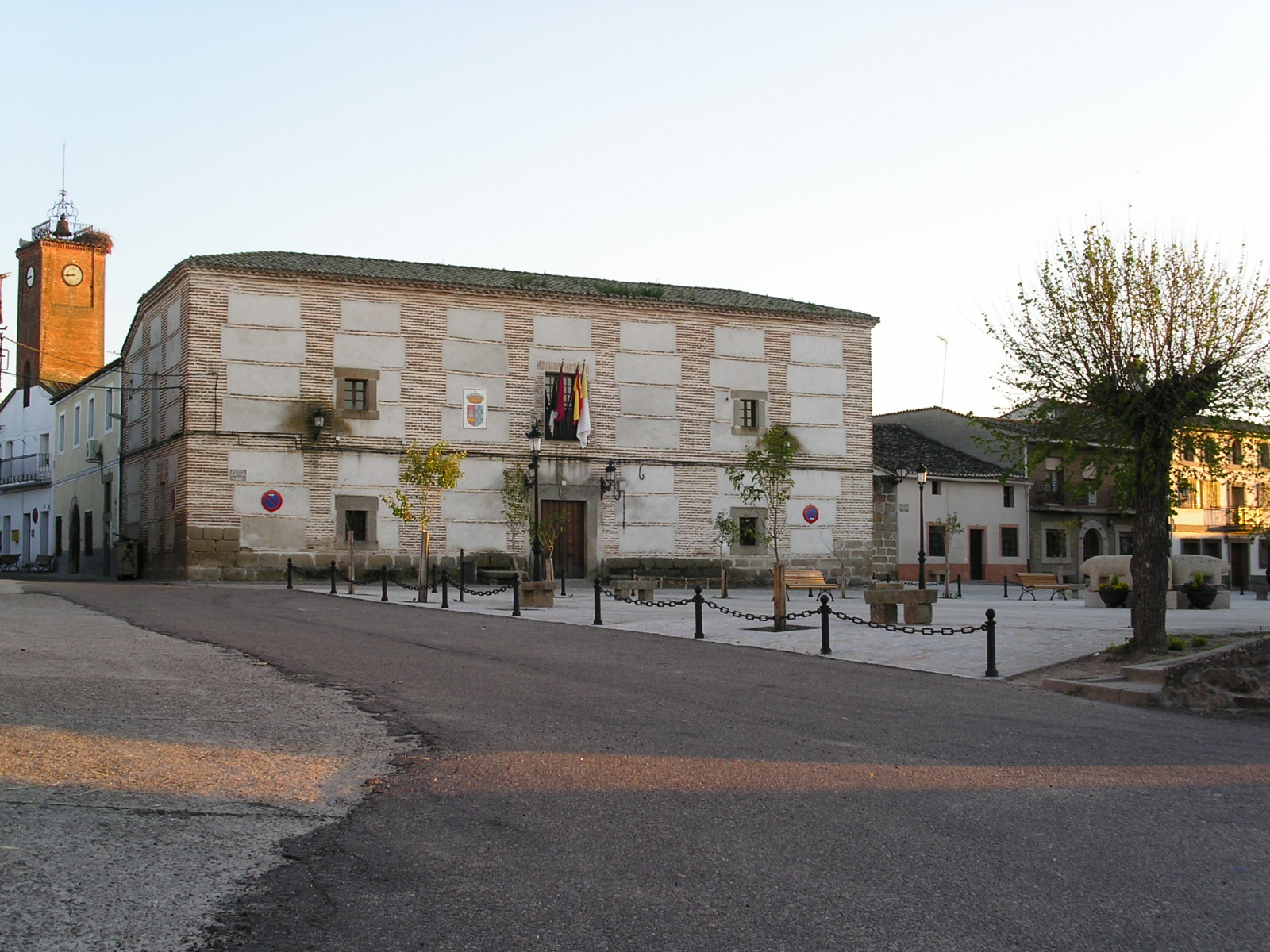
- The city hall

- Flag Coat of arms
- Interactive map of Torralba de Oropesa
- Country: Spain
- Autonomous community: Castile-La Mancha
- Province: Toledo
- Municipality: Torralba de Oropesa

Area
  - Total: 23.45 km^{2} (9.05 sq mi)
- Elevation: 396 m (1,299 ft)

Population (2025-01-01)
  - Total: 186
  - Density: 7.93/km^{2} (20.5/sq mi)
- Time zone: UTC+1 (CET)
  - Summer (DST): UTC+2 (CEST)

Torralba de Oropesa is a municipality located in the province of Toledo, Castile-La Mancha, Spain. According to the 2006 census (INE), the municipality had a population of 205 inhabitants.

== Demographics ==
Historical population
Year	Pop.	±%
1900	637	—
1910	746	+17.1%
1920	644	−13.7%
1930	868	+34.8%
1940	811	−6.6%
1950	814	+0.4%
1960	729	−10.4%
1970	505	−30.7%
1981	306	−39.4%
1991	298	−2.6%
2001	264	−11.4%
2011	275	+4.2%
2021	188	−31.6%
2023	192	+2.1%
Source: INE
