= La Nava de Ricomalillo =

- municipality
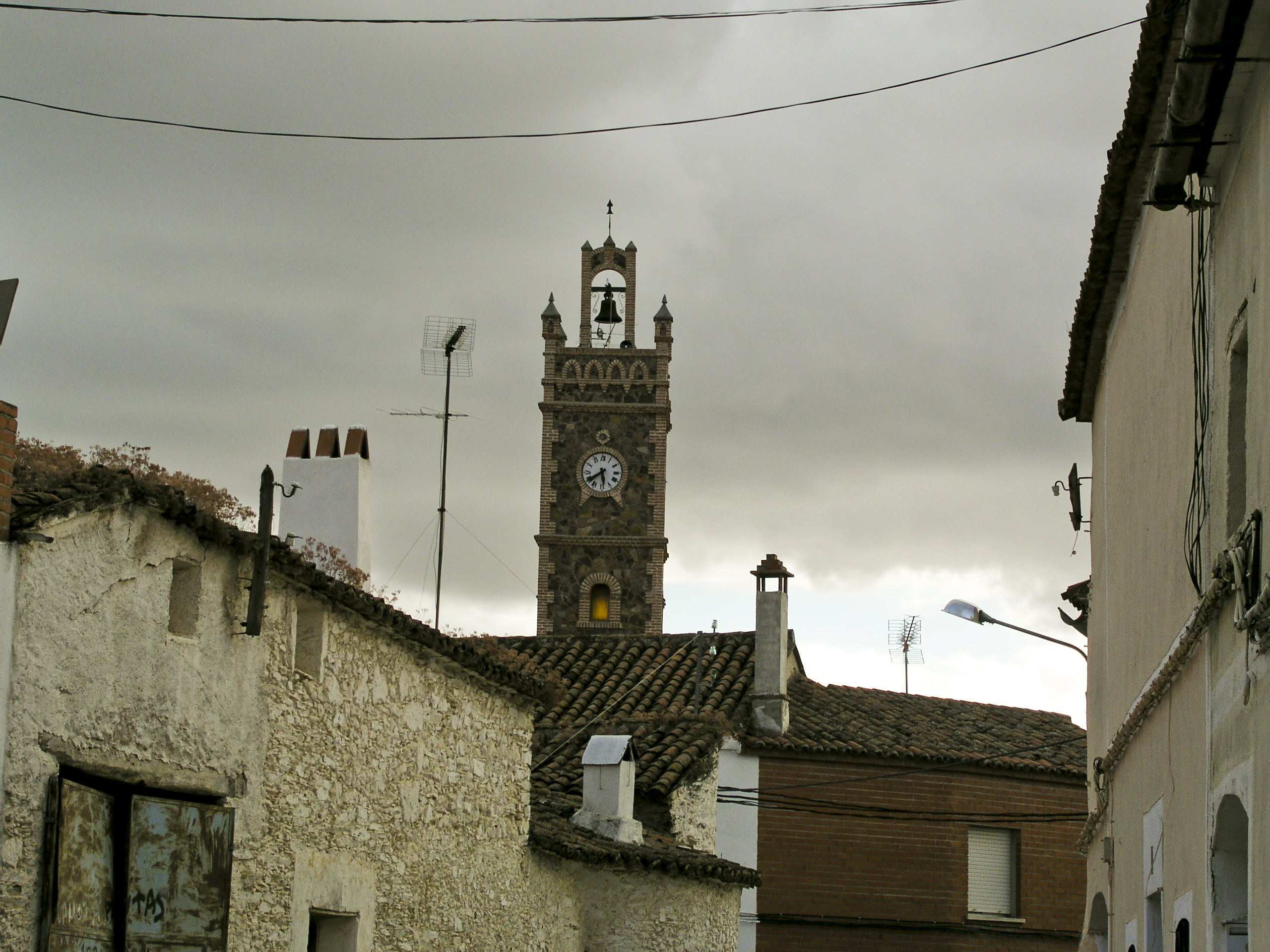
- Town hall tower

- Coat of arms

- Location in Spain
- Coordinates: 39°39′N 4°59′W
- Country: Spain
- Autonomous community: Castile-La Mancha
- Province: Toledo
- Comarca: La Jara

Area
  - Total: 40 km^{2} (15 sq mi)
- Elevation: 645 m (2,116 ft)

Population (2025-01-01)
  - Total: 514
  - Density: 13/km^{2} (33/sq mi)
- Time zone: UTC+1 (CET)
  - Summer (DST): UTC+2 (CEST)

La Nava de Ricomalillo is a municipality located in the province of Toledo, Castile-La Mancha, Spain. According to the 2014 census, the municipality has a population of 594 inhabitants.

== Demographics ==
Historical population
Year	Pop.	±%
1900	946	—
1910	983	+3.9%
1920	1,306	+32.9%
1930	1,493	+14.3%
1940	1,451	−2.8%
1950	1,594	+9.9%
1960	1,697	+6.5%
1970	1,104	−34.9%
1981	842	−23.7%
1991	727	−13.7%
2001	708	−2.6%
2011	671	−5.2%
2021	521	−22.4%
2023	496	−4.8%
Source: INE
