= Torrecilla de la Jara =

- municipality
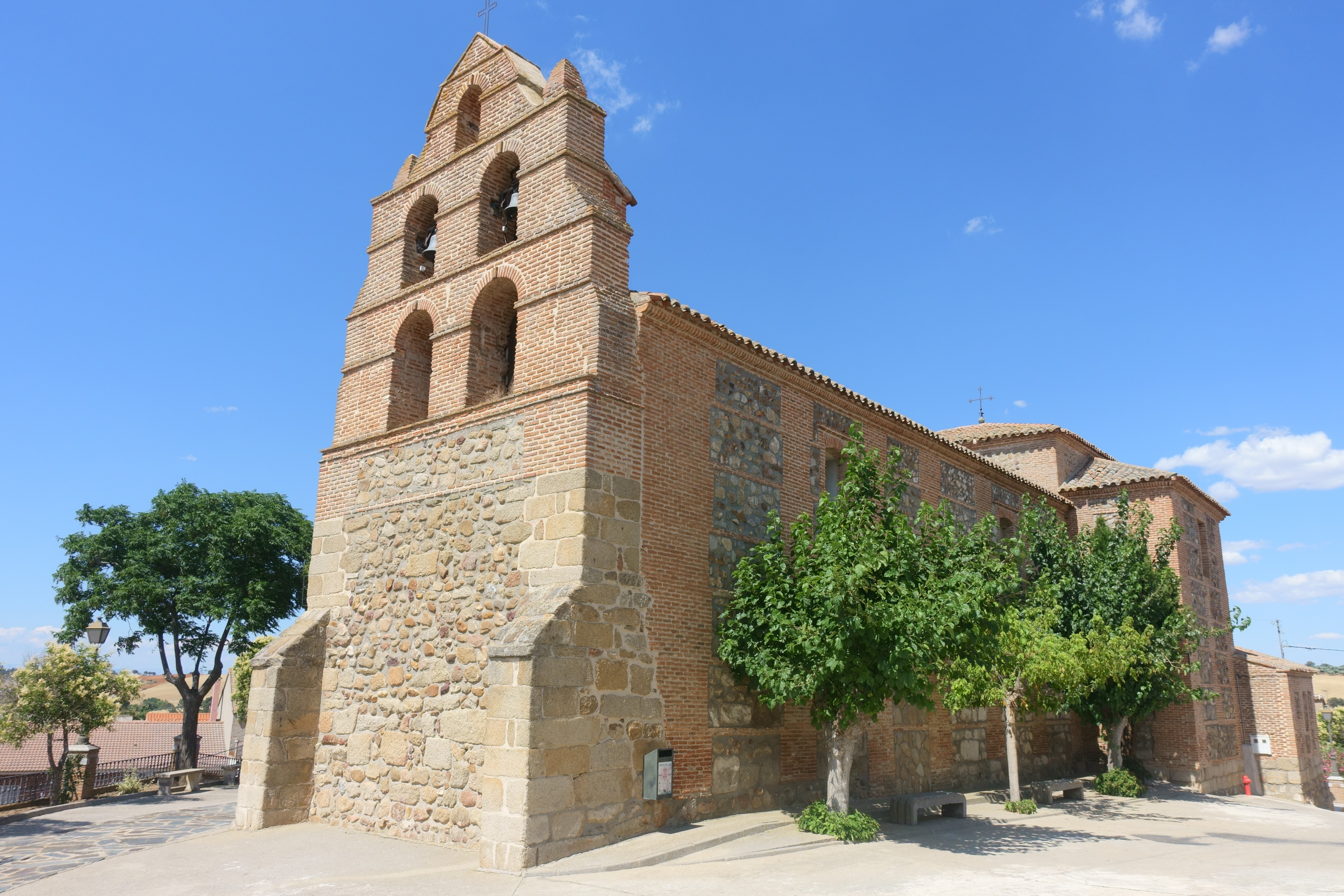
- A church at Torrecilla de la Jara.

- Coat of arms

- Location within Castilla-La Mancha Location within Spain
- Coordinates: 39°42′N 4°46′W
- Country: Spain
- Autonomous community: Castilla–La Mancha
- Province: Toledo
- Comarca: La Jara

Government
  - Mayor: Juan Carlos Martín González (PP)

Area
  - Total: 70.61 km^{2} (27.26 sq mi)
- Elevation: 648 m (2,126 ft)

Population (2023)
  - Total: 211
  - Density: 2.99/km^{2} (7.74/sq mi)
- Time zone: UTC+1 (CET)
  - Summer (DST): UTC+2 (CEST)

Torrecilla de la Jara is a municipality located in the province of Toledo, Castile-La Mancha, Spain. According to the 2023 census (INE), the municipality has a population of 211 inhabitants.
