= El Campillo de la Jara =

- Municipality
- Coat of arms

- Location in Spain
- Coordinates: 39°35′N 5°3′W
- Country: Spain
- Autonomous community: Castile-La Mancha
- Province: Toledo
- Comarca: La Jara

Area
  - Total: 86.06 km^{2} (33.23 sq mi)
- Elevation: 648 m (2,126 ft)

Population (2025-01-01)
  - Total: 326
  - Density: 3.79/km^{2} (9.81/sq mi)
- Time zone: UTC+1 (CET)
  - Summer (DST): UTC+2 (CEST)

El Campillo de la Jara is a municipality located in the province of Toledo, Castile-La Mancha, Spain. According to the 2014 census, the municipality has a population of 410 inhabitants.

== Demographics ==
Historical population
Year	Pop.	±%
1900	1,641	—
1910	1,694	+3.2%
1920	1,463	−13.6%
1930	1,575	+7.7%
1940	1,435	−8.9%
1950	1,633	+13.8%
1960	1,717	+5.1%
1970	1,037	−39.6%
1981	733	−29.3%
1991	661	−9.8%
2001	502	−24.1%
2011	465	−7.4%
2021	356	−23.4%
2023	330	−7.3%
Source: ISTAT

== See also ==
- La Jara
