= San Román de los Montes =

Coordinates: 40.071°N 4.731°W

San Román de los Montes, Spain
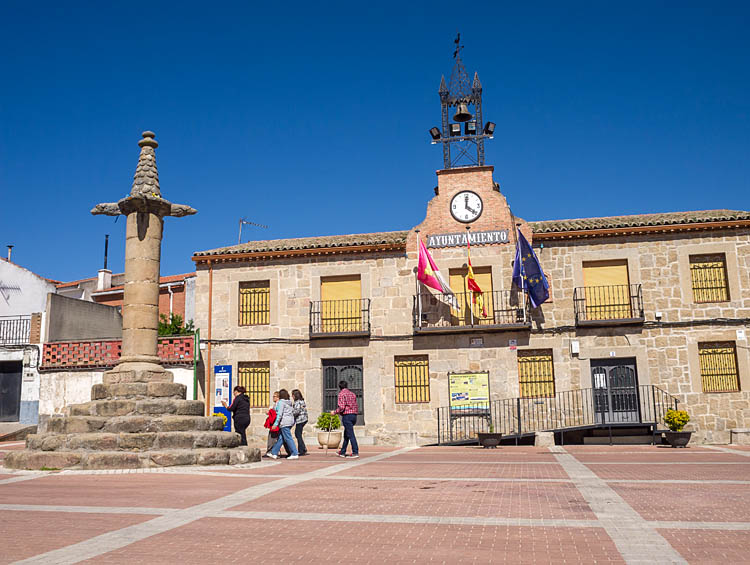
- San Román de los Montes Town Hall

- Coat of arms
- Interactive map of San Román de los Montes, Spain
- Country: Spain
- Autonomous community: Castile-La Mancha
- Province: Toledo
- Municipality: San Román de los Montes

Area
  - Total: 45 km^{2} (17 sq mi)
- Elevation: 440 m (1,440 ft)

Population (2025-01-01)
  - Total: 2,191
  - Density: 49/km^{2} (130/sq mi)
- Time zone: UTC+1 (CET)
  - Summer (DST): UTC+2 (CEST)

San Román de los Montes is a municipality located in the province of Toledo, Castile-La Mancha, Spain. According to the 2011 census (INE), the municipality has a population of 1,449 inhabitants.

== Demographics ==
Historical population
Year	Pop.	±%
1900	710	—
1910	811	+14.2%
1920	767	−5.4%
1930	763	−0.5%
1940	936	+22.7%
1950	1,017	+8.7%
1960	648	−36.3%
1970	363	−44.0%
1981	231	−36.4%
1991	434	+87.9%
2001	761	+75.3%
2011	1,824	+139.7%
2021	1,969	+7.9%
2023	2,071	+5.2%
Source: INE
