= Puerto de San Vicente =

- municipality
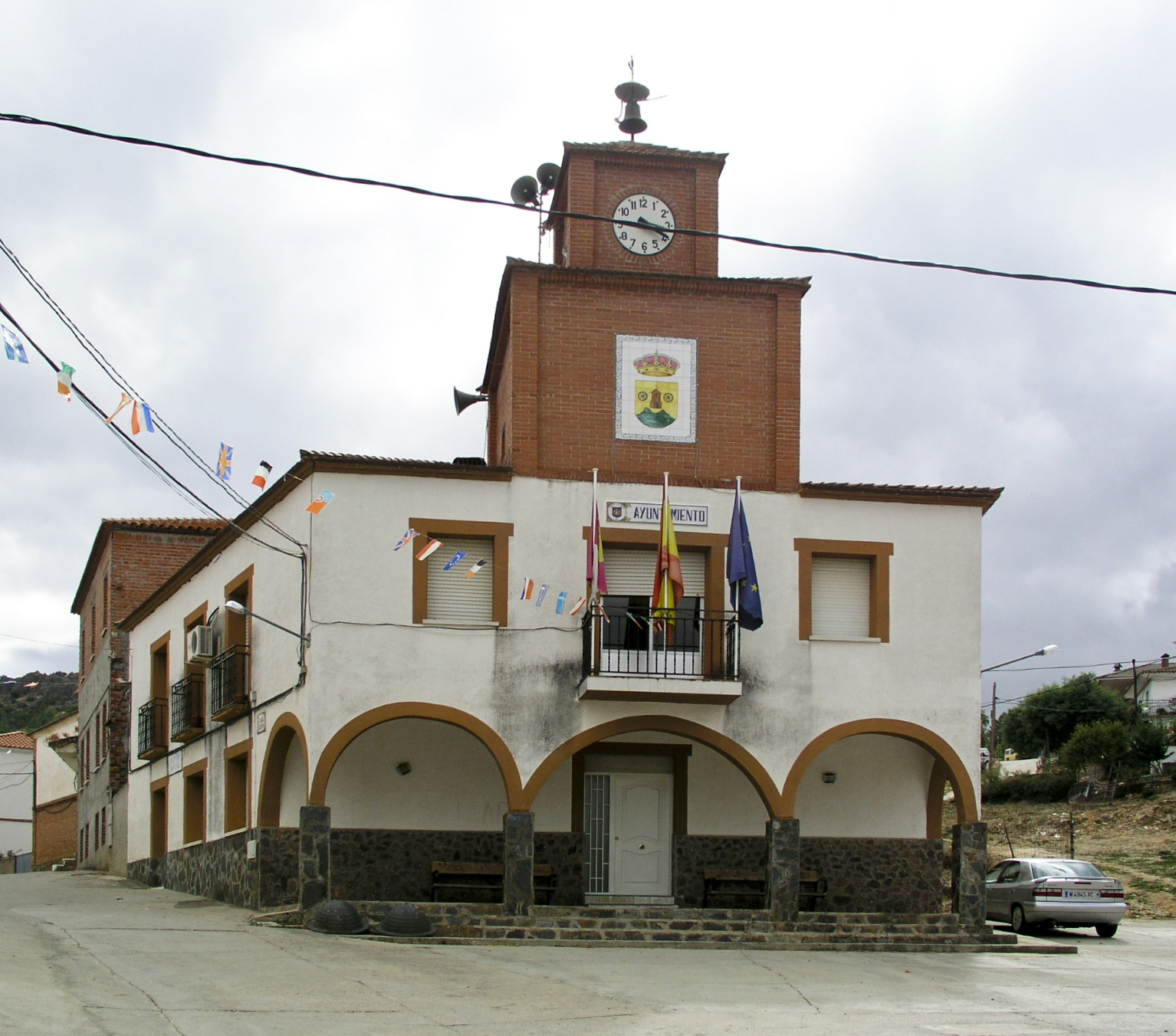
- Town hall

- Coat of arms

- Location in Spain
- Coordinates: 39°31′N 5°7′W
- Country: Spain
- Autonomous community: Castile-La Mancha
- Province: Toledo
- Comarca: La Jara

Area
  - Total: 46 km^{2} (18 sq mi)
- Elevation: 736 m (2,415 ft)

Population (2025-01-01)
  - Total: 141
  - Density: 3.1/km^{2} (7.9/sq mi)
- Time zone: UTC+1 (CET)
  - Summer (DST): UTC+2 (CEST)

Puerto de San Vicente is a municipality located at the western end of the province of Toledo, Castile-La Mancha, Spain. According to the 2014 census, the municipality has a population of 202 inhabitants.

== Buildings ==
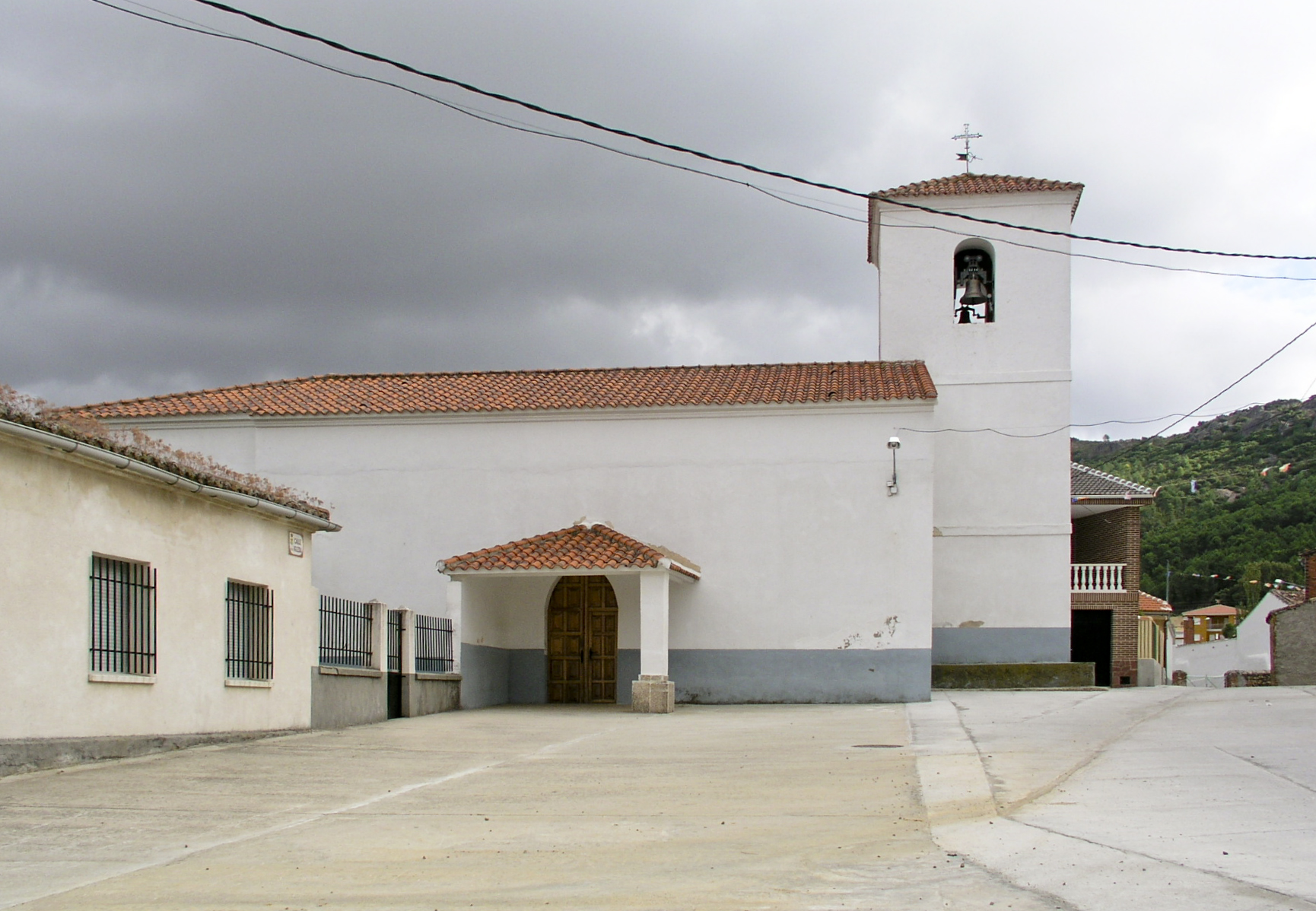
View of the main church building

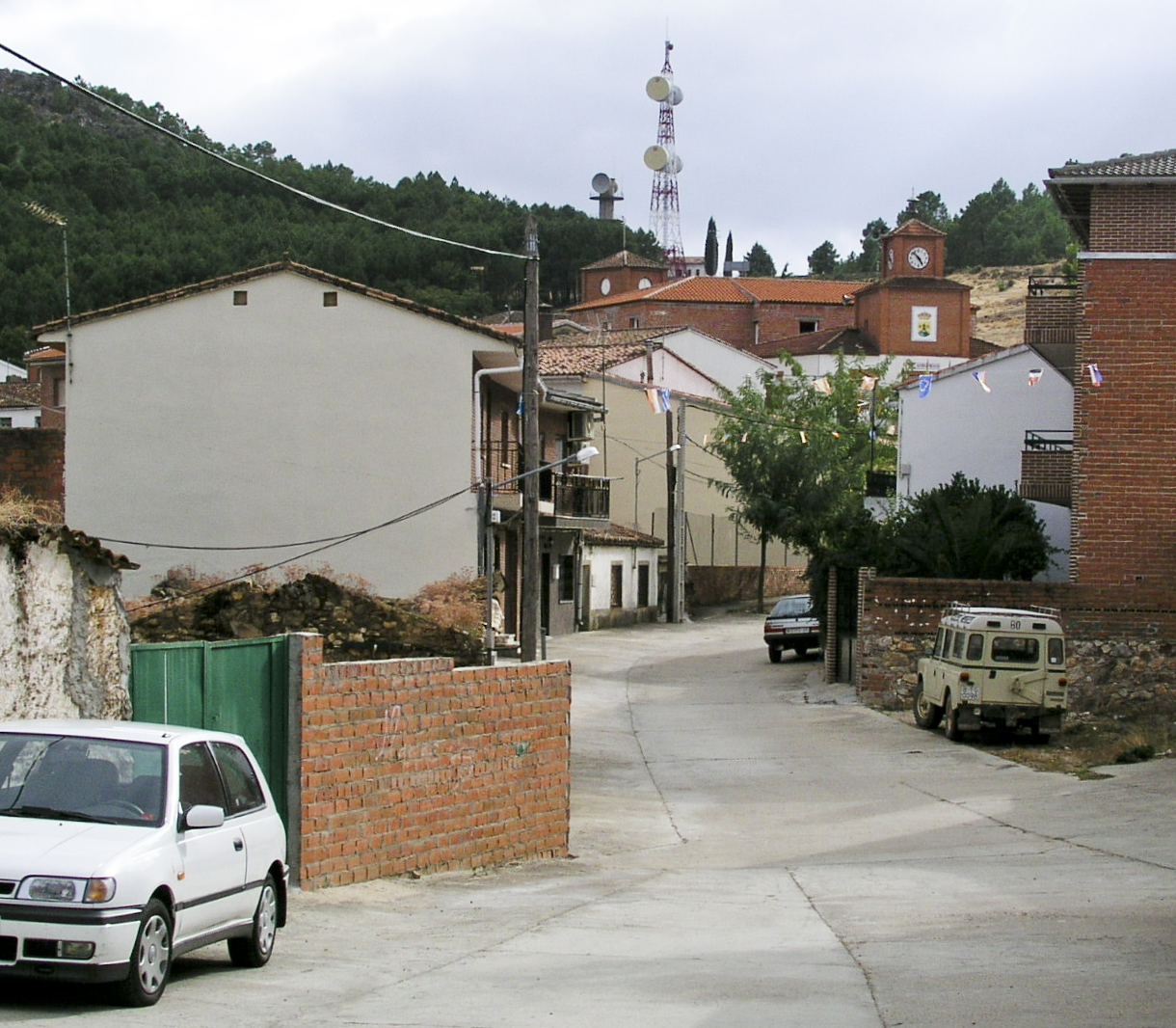
View of a street

== See also ==
- La Jara (comarca)
