= Retamoso de la Jara =

Village in Toledo, Spain

Coordinates: 39°45′N 4°45′W

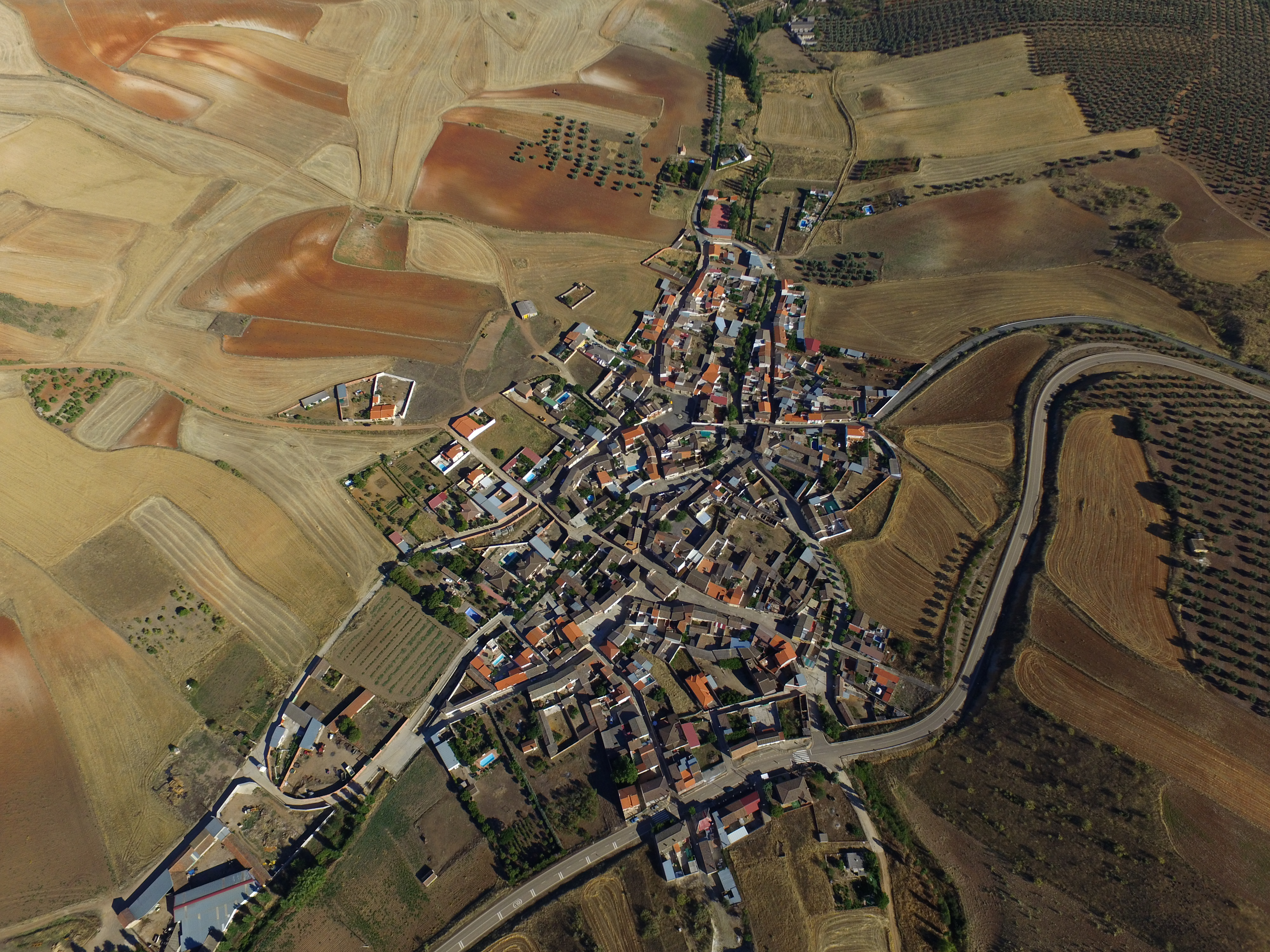
Aerial photo of Retamoso de la Jara. in 2017.

Flag of Retamoso de la Jara

Coat of arms of Retamoso de la Jara

Retamoso de la Jara is a village in the province of Toledo and autonomous community of Castile-La Mancha, Spain. In 2004 the municipality changed its name of Retamoso by Retamoso de la Jara.
