= Mohedas de la Jara =

Coordinates: 39°36′N 5°08′W

- municipality
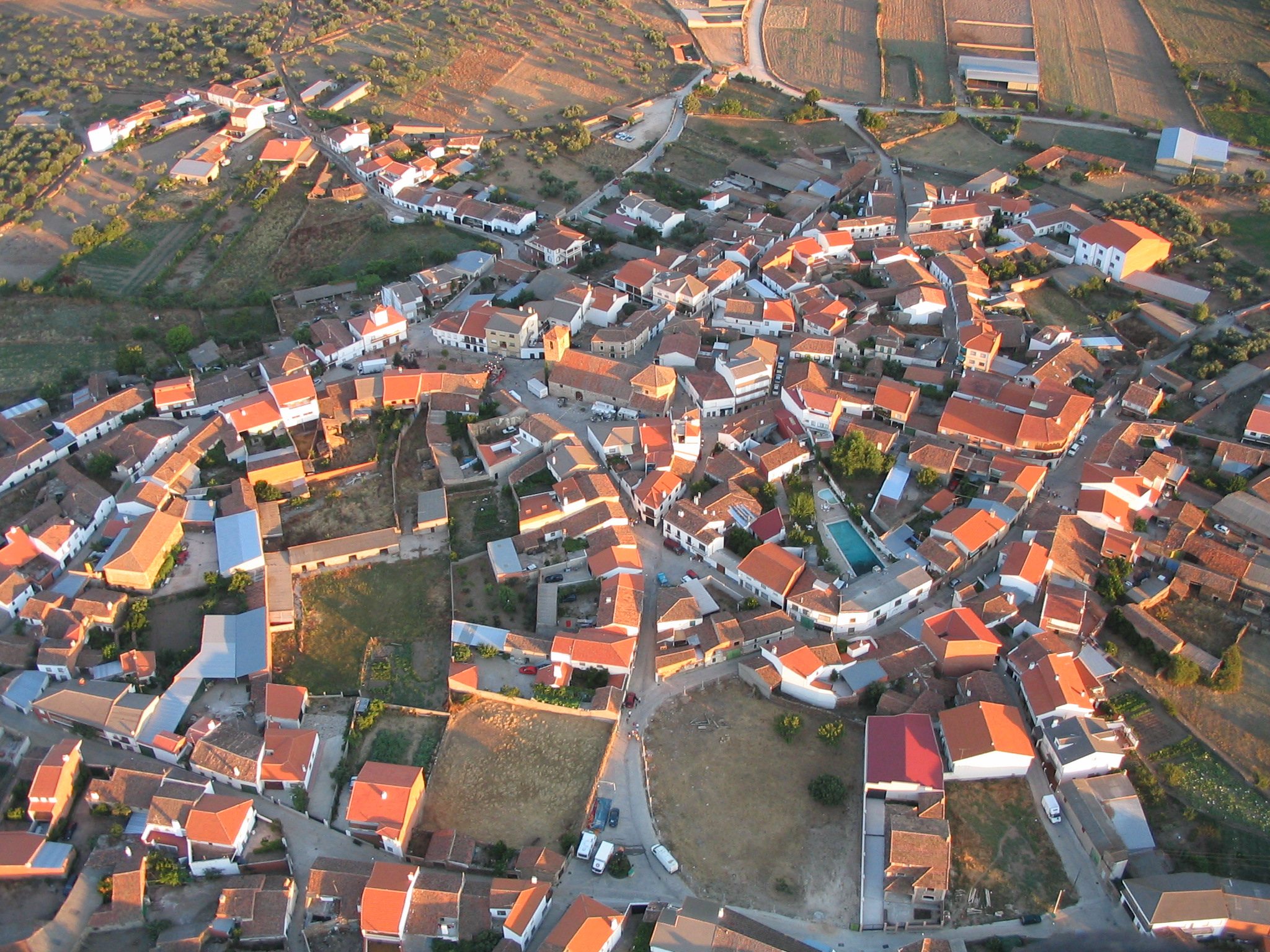
- Aerial photograph of Mohedas de la Jara

- Flag Coat of arms
- Interactive map of Mohedas de la Jara
- Country: Spain
- Autonomous community: Castile-La Mancha
- Province: Toledo
- Municipality: Mohedas de la Jara

Area
  - Total: 60 km^{2} (23 sq mi)
- Elevation: 644 m (2,113 ft)

Population (2025-01-01)
  - Total: 384
  - Density: 6.4/km^{2} (17/sq mi)
- Time zone: UTC+1 (CET)
  - Summer (DST): UTC+2 (CEST)

Mohedas de la Jara is a municipality located in the province of Toledo, Castile-La Mancha, Spain. According to the 2006 census (INE), the municipality has a population of 522 inhabitants.
