= Los Navalucillos =

Coordinates: 39°40′N 4°38′W

- municipality
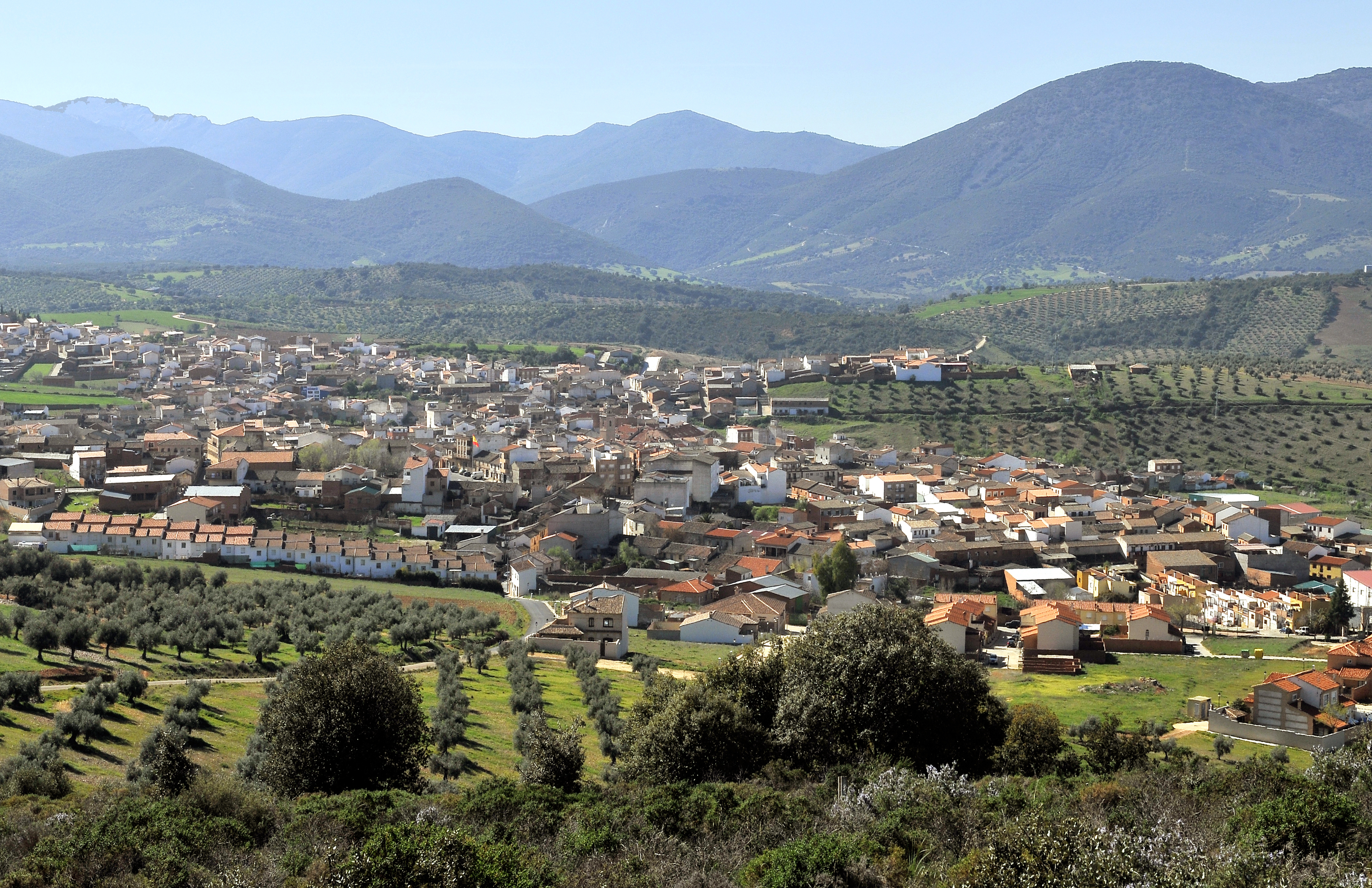

- Flag Coat of arms
- Interactive map of Los Navalucillos
- Country: Spain
- Autonomous community: Castile-La Mancha
- Province: Toledo
- Municipality: Los Navalucillos

Area
  - Total: 356 km^{2} (137 sq mi)
- Elevation: 740 m (2,430 ft)

Population (2025-01-01)
  - Total: 1,889
  - Density: 5.31/km^{2} (13.7/sq mi)
- Time zone: UTC+1 (CET)
  - Summer (DST): UTC+2 (CEST)

Los Navalucillos is a municipality located in the province of Toledo, Castile-La Mancha, Spain. According to the 2018 census (INE), the municipality has a population of 2171 inhabitants.

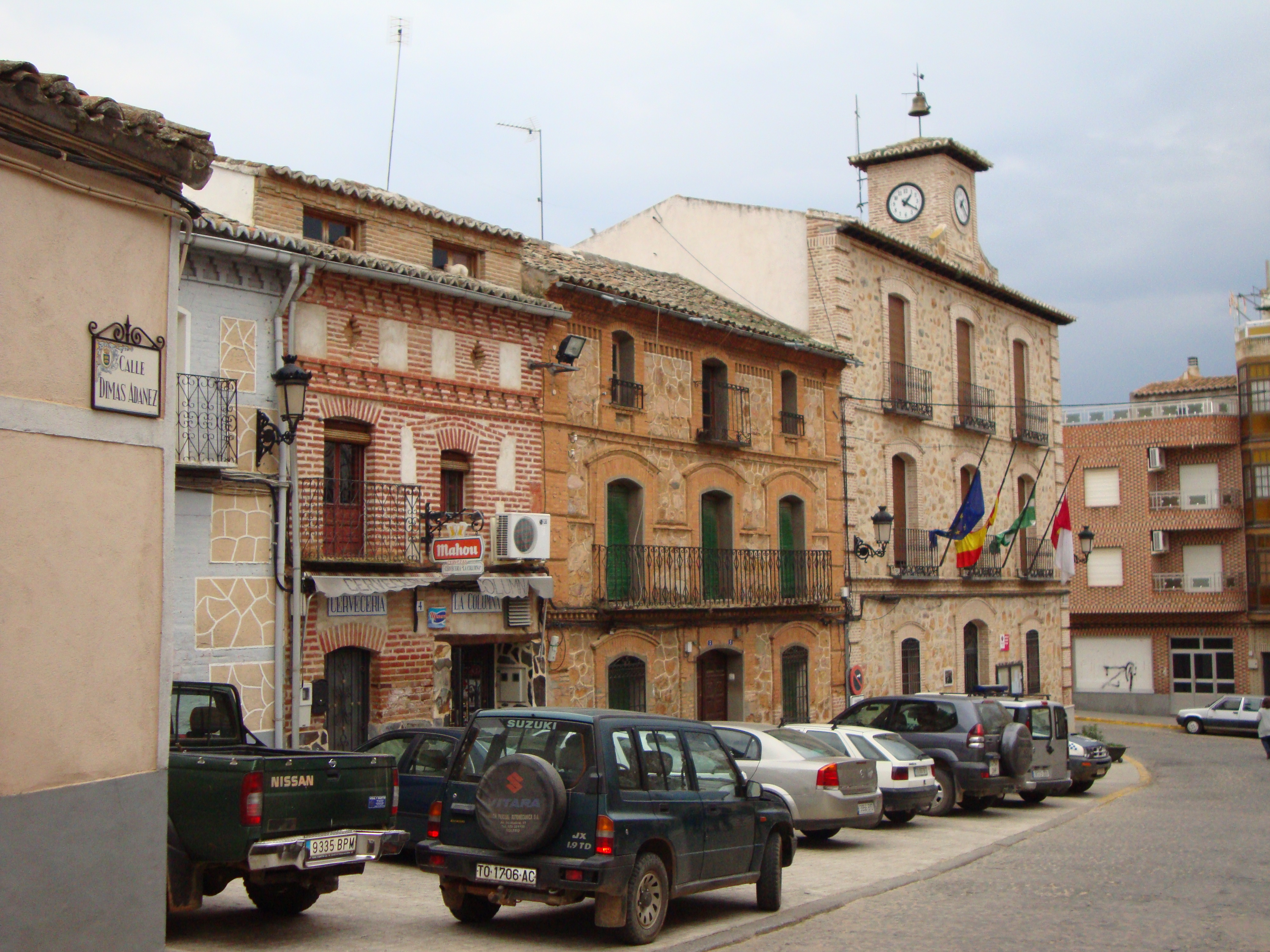
Navalucillos Main Square

== History ==
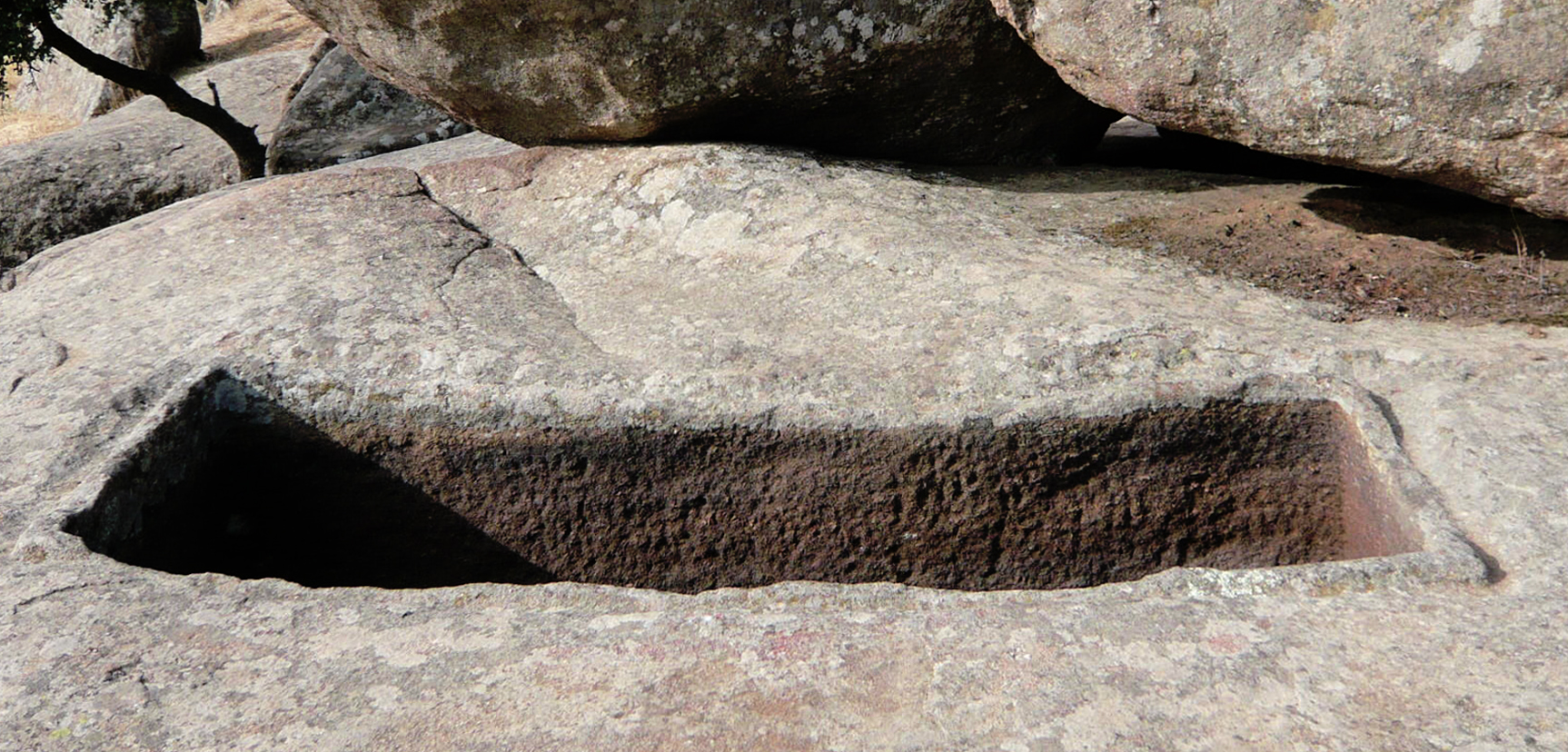
Tomb in Los Navalucillos

Several cave tombs have been found from the Muslim era that evoke Mozarabic rites. It seems that the foundation of the town took place in the first half of the 14th century, although it appears for the first time, as Naualuciellos, in a document dated February 5, 1209. In said document Alfonso VIII donates to Alfonso Téllez the town of Montalbán with its corresponding terms:

«Ex parte Talauarie per ualle sicco, comodo vadit uia ad illos Mosaraues, et comodo pergit ad illa calsata, et sicut uadit ad Vallmoral, et deinde Naualuciellos, et posta usque ad illum portum, et deinde usque ad Mauros quantum potueritis».

— Alfonso VIII, February 5, 1209.

In another document dated May 26, 1357, where Pedro I granted the lordship of Valdepusa to Diego Gómez, senior notary, it appears as Nava luezillos :

«... give us justice in the Valdepusa lordship, Talauera district that starts from the Alcachal fasta in the Tajo river, as well as part with Mal pyca and with Montaluán and with Nava luezillos ...».

— Pedro I of Castile, May 26, 1357.

In 1492, with the expulsion of the Jews, many of them settled in these lands, leaving as a legacy some customs that are preserved to this day.

Between the 15th century and the 17th century, Los Navalucillos led the region economically, receiving migration mainly from neighboring Extremadura.

The moment of greatest splendor of the town was the 18th century whose ecclesiastical union, achieved by Cardinal Lorenzana, was seconded by an administrative union of the two Navalucillos, Navalucillos de Talavera de la Reina and Navalucillos from Toledo.

In the middle of the 19th century it had 500 houses and the municipal budget amounted to 25,590 reals. At that time there was an iron foundry established by José Safont in the Mazo area next to the Pusa River. The factory was supplied with extractions from "los arrumbales, los acebales, crags de Juan Antón, de la Ermita y de los Lagares", in the municipality of Los Navalucillos, and from the mines of Herrera in Los Navalmorales.

The town experienced its greatest demographic increase in the 1950s, with a population of approximately 7000 inhabitants.

Currently, Los Navalucillos tries to return to those moments of splendor, promoting activities oriented to rural tourism, or the expansion of the Cabañeros National Park at the end of the 2000s.
