= Belvís de la Jara =

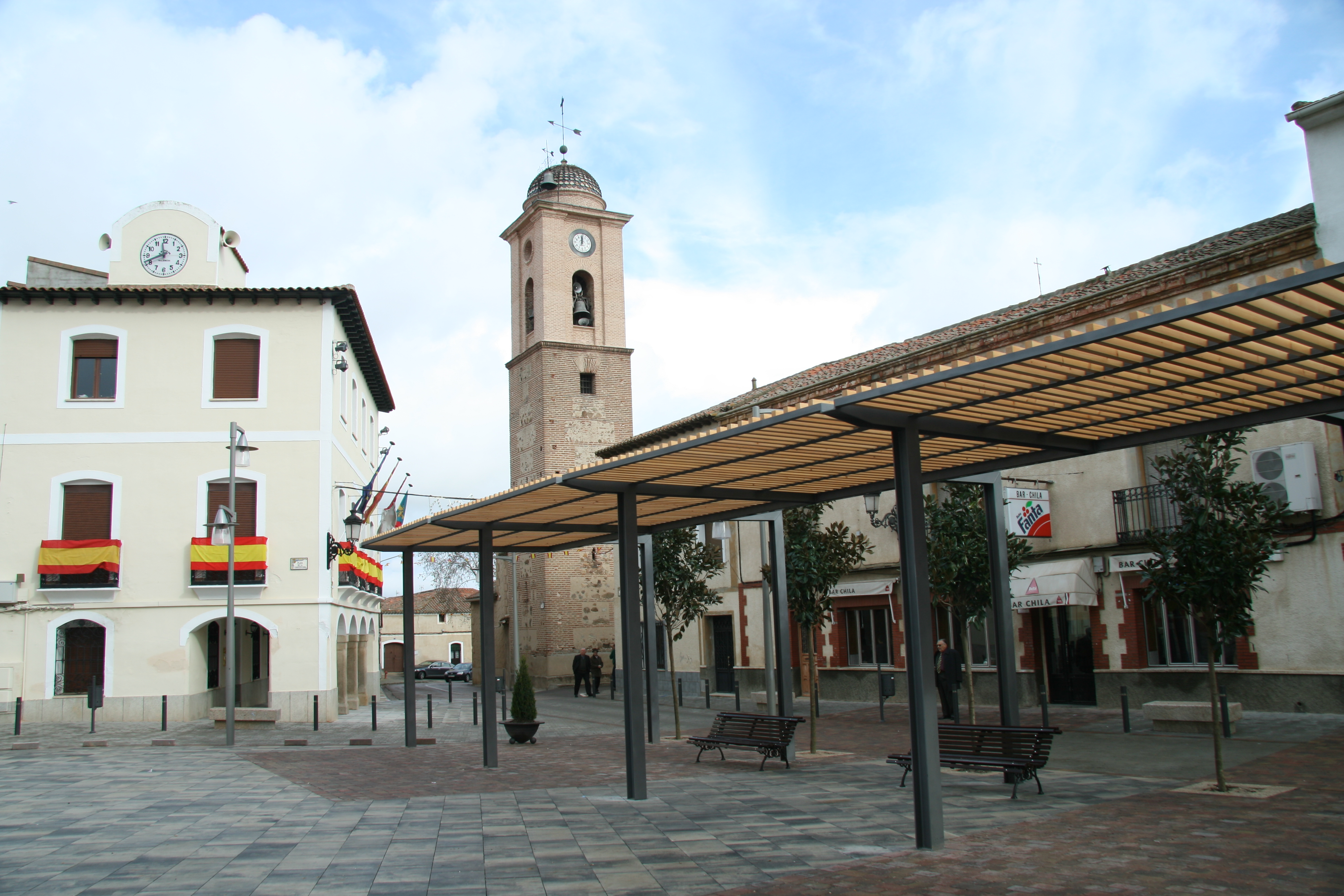

- Flag Coat of arms

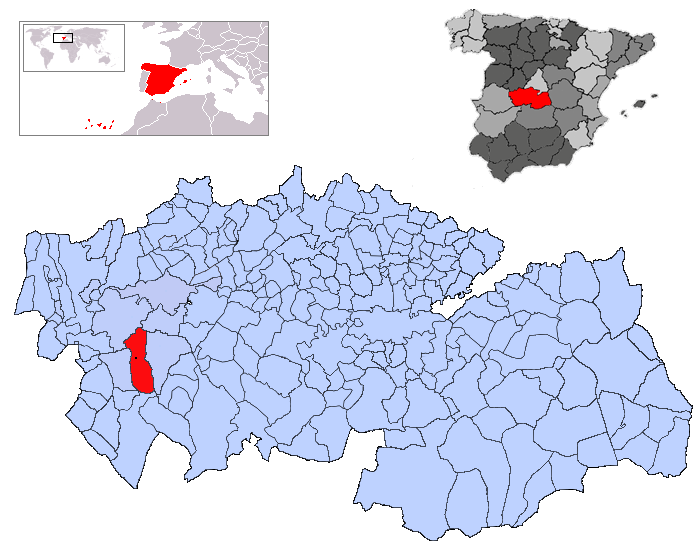
- Location in the province of Toledo

- Location in Spain
- Coordinates: 39°45′34″N 4°56′58″W
- Country: Spain
- Autonomous community: Castile-La Mancha
- Province: Toledo
- Municipality: Belvís de la Jara

Area
  - Total: 114 km^{2} (44 sq mi)
- Elevation: 450 m (1,480 ft)

Population (2025-01-01)
  - Total: 1,475
  - Density: 12.9/km^{2} (33.5/sq mi)
- Time zone: UTC+1 (CET)
  - Summer (DST): UTC+2 (CEST)

Belvís de la Jara is a municipality located in the province of Toledo, Castile-La Mancha, Spain. According to the 2006 census (INE), the municipality has a population of 1735 inhabitants.

The town neighbors between Puerto Lasnuco, A district located in northwest Belvís de la Jara.

== Demographics ==
Historical population
Year	Pop.	±%
1900	3,492	—
1910	3,827	+9.6%
1920	3,957	+3.4%
1930	4,600	+16.2%
1940	4,439	−3.5%
1950	5,040	+13.5%
1960	4,913	−2.5%
1970	3,122	−36.5%
1981	2,062	−34.0%
1991	1,844	−10.6%
2001	1,700	−7.8%
2011	1,814	+6.7%
2021	1,543	−14.9%
2023	1,492	−3.3%
Source: ISTAT
