= San Bartolomé de las Abiertas =

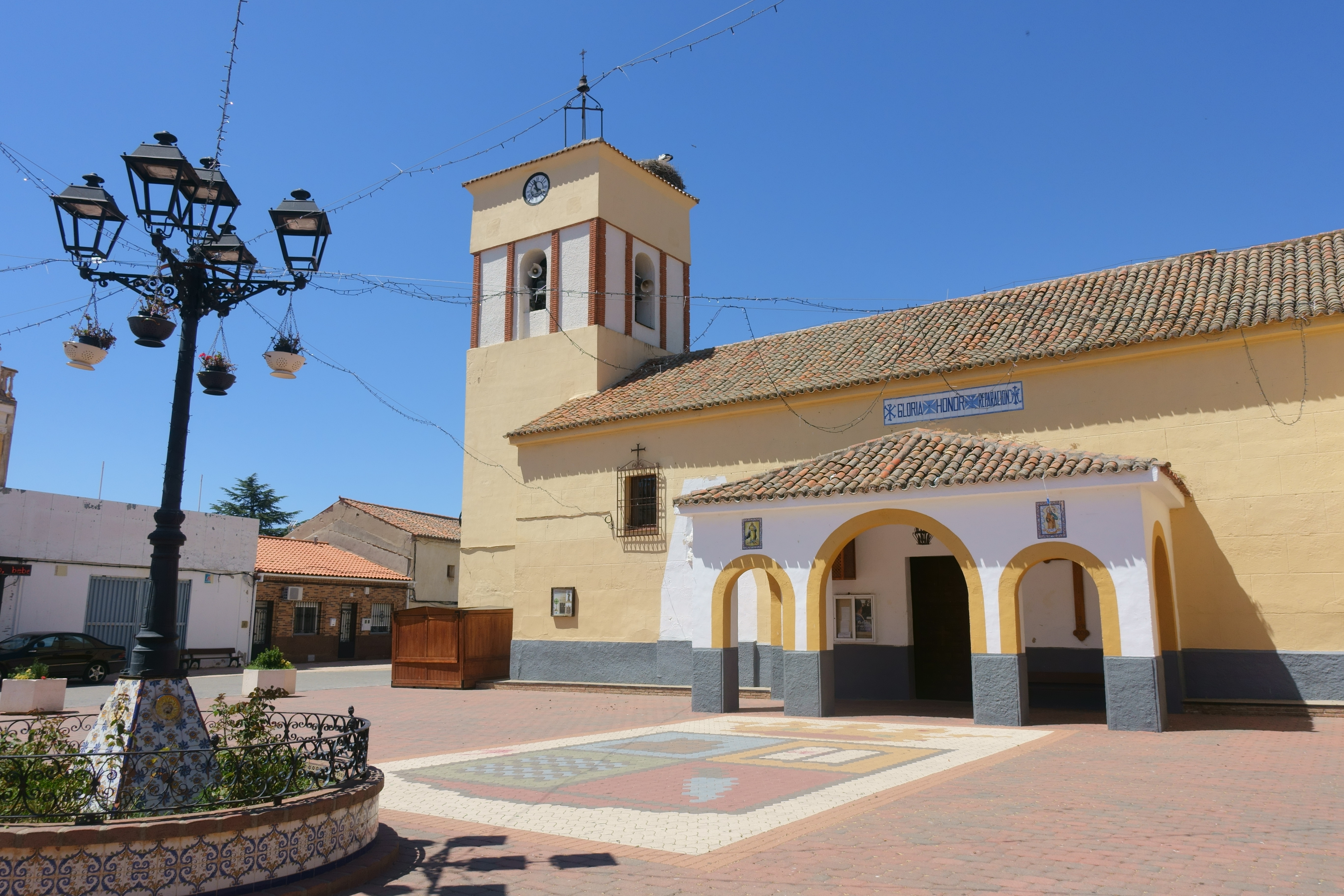
- Church in San Bartolomé de las Abiertas

- Flag Coat of arms

- Location in Spain
- Coordinates: 39°49′48″N 4°42′56″W
- Country: Spain
- Autonomous community: Castile-La Mancha
- Province: Toledo
- Comarca: La Jara

Government
  - Mayor: Esteban Benito Blázquez Pascual

Area
  - Total: 56.86 km^{2} (21.95 sq mi)
- Elevation: 554 m (1,818 ft)

Population (2025-01-01)
  - Total: 637
  - Density: 11.2/km^{2} (29.0/sq mi)
- Demonym: Bartolos
- Time zone: UTC+1 (CET)
  - Summer (DST): UTC+2 (CEST)
- Website: Official website

San Bartolomé de las Abiertas is a municipality located in the province of Toledo, Castile-La Mancha, Spain. As of 2010, the municipality had a population of 588 inhabitants.
