= San Martín de Pusa =

Coordinates: 39°47′N 4°38′W

San Martín de Pusa, Spain
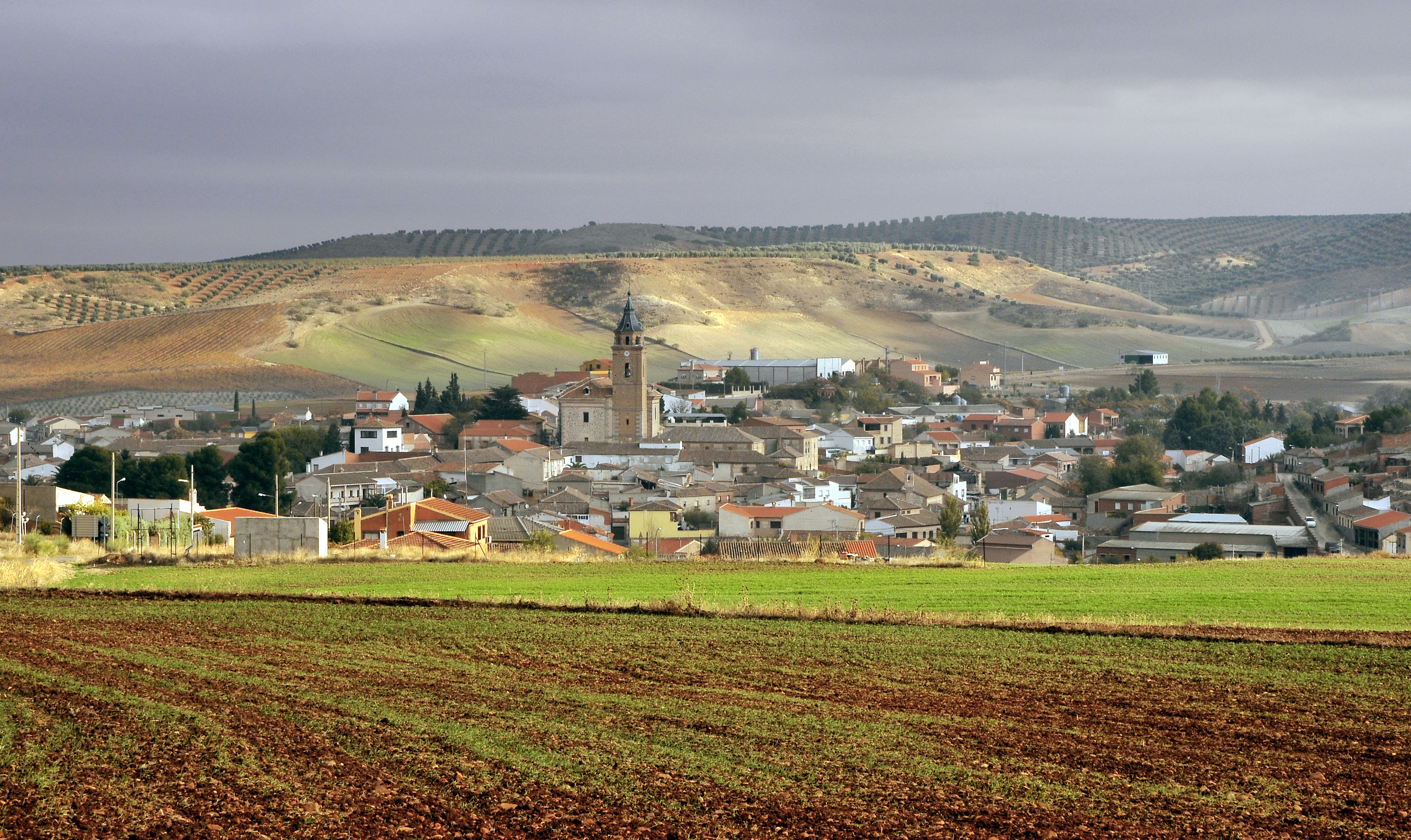
- San Martín de Pusa and Surroundings

- Coat of arms
- Interactive map of San Martín de Pusa, Spain
- Country: Spain
- Autonomous community: Castile-La Mancha
- Province: Toledo
- Municipality: San Martín de Pusa

Area
  - Total: 104 km^{2} (40 sq mi)
- Elevation: 507 m (1,663 ft)

Population (2025-01-01)
  - Total: 623
  - Density: 5.99/km^{2} (15.5/sq mi)
- Time zone: UTC+1 (CET)
  - Summer (DST): UTC+2 (CEST)

San Martín de Pusa is a municipality located in the province of Toledo, Castile-La Mancha, Spain. According to the 2006 census (INE), the municipality has a population of 825 inhabitants.

== Demographics ==
Historical population
Year	Pop.	±%
1900	1,483	—
1910	1,671	+12.7%
1920	1,465	−12.3%
1930	1,822	+24.4%
1940	1,905	+4.6%
1950	2,218	+16.4%
1960	1,917	−13.6%
1970	1,217	−36.5%
1981	741	−39.1%
1991	807	+8.9%
2001	769	−4.7%
2011	847	+10.1%
2021	610	−28.0%
2023	590	−3.3%
Source: INE
