= Espinoso del Rey =

Coordinates: 39°38′N 4°47′W

- Municipality
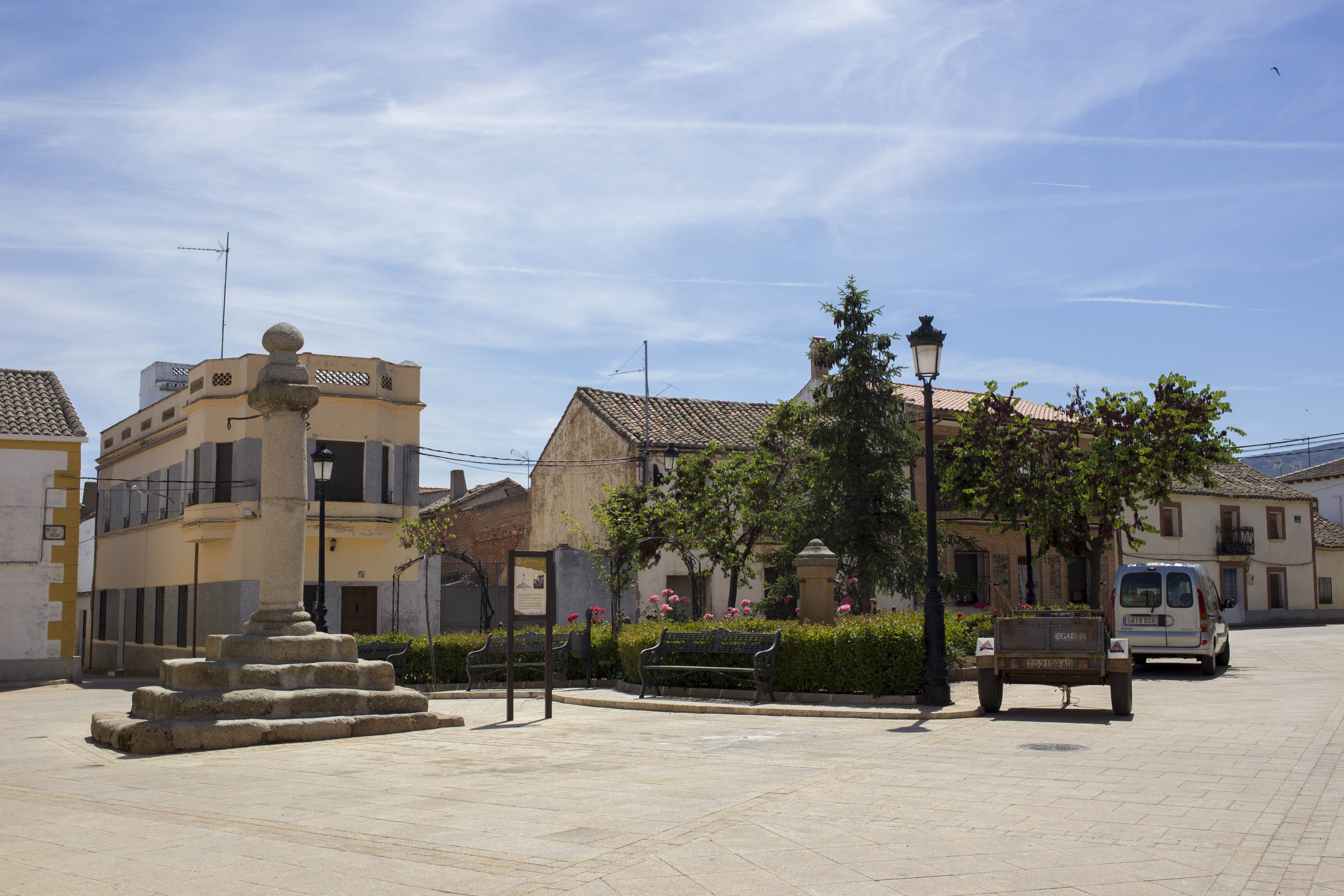

- Coat of arms
- Interactive map of Espinoso del Rey
- Country: Spain
- Autonomous community: Castile-La Mancha
- Province: Toledo

Area
  - Total: 48 km^{2} (19 sq mi)
- Elevation: 723 m (2,372 ft)

Population (2025-01-01)
  - Total: 420
  - Density: 8.7/km^{2} (23/sq mi)
- Time zone: UTC+1 (CET)
  - Summer (DST): UTC+2 (CEST)

Espinoso del Rey is a municipality of Spain located in the province of Toledo, Castilla–La Mancha. The municipality has a total area of 48.28 km^{2} and, as of 1 January 2019, a registered population of 436, according to the INE.

== History ==
Previously a hamlet belonging to the land of Talavera de la Reina, Espinoso del Rey (simply known as Espinoso at the time) was granted the privilege of town (villa) in 1579, during the reign of Philip II.
