= Castillo de Bayuela =

- municipality
- Flag Coat of arms

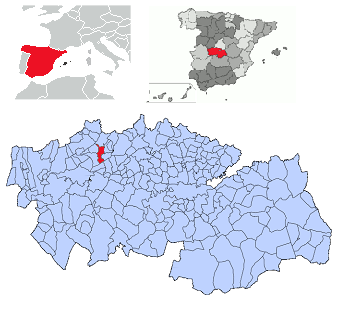

- Location within Castilla-La Mancha Location within Spain
- Coordinates: 40°05′58″N 4°41′03″W
- Country: Spain
- Autonomous community: Castile-La Mancha
- Province: Toledo
- Municipality: Castillo de Bayuela

Area
  - Total: 37 km^{2} (14 sq mi)
- Elevation: 563 m (1,847 ft)

Population (2025-01-01)
  - Total: 889
  - Density: 24/km^{2} (62/sq mi)
- Time zone: UTC+1 (CET)
  - Summer (DST): UTC+2 (CEST)

Castillo de Bayuela is a municipality located in the province of Toledo, Castile-La Mancha, Spain. According to the 2006 census (INE), the municipality had a population of 1,054 inhabitants.

== Demographics ==
Historical population
Year	Pop.	±%
1900	1,195	—
1910	1,306	+9.3%
1920	1,458	+11.6%
1930	1,591	+9.1%
1940	1,726	+8.5%
1950	1,800	+4.3%
1960	1,659	−7.8%
1970	1,289	−22.3%
1981	1,148	−10.9%
1991	1,029	−10.4%
2001	1,007	−2.1%
2011	1,051	+4.4%
2021	918	−12.7%
2023	905	−1.4%
Source: INE
