= Los Navalmorales =

Coordinates: 39°43′N 4°38′W

- municipality
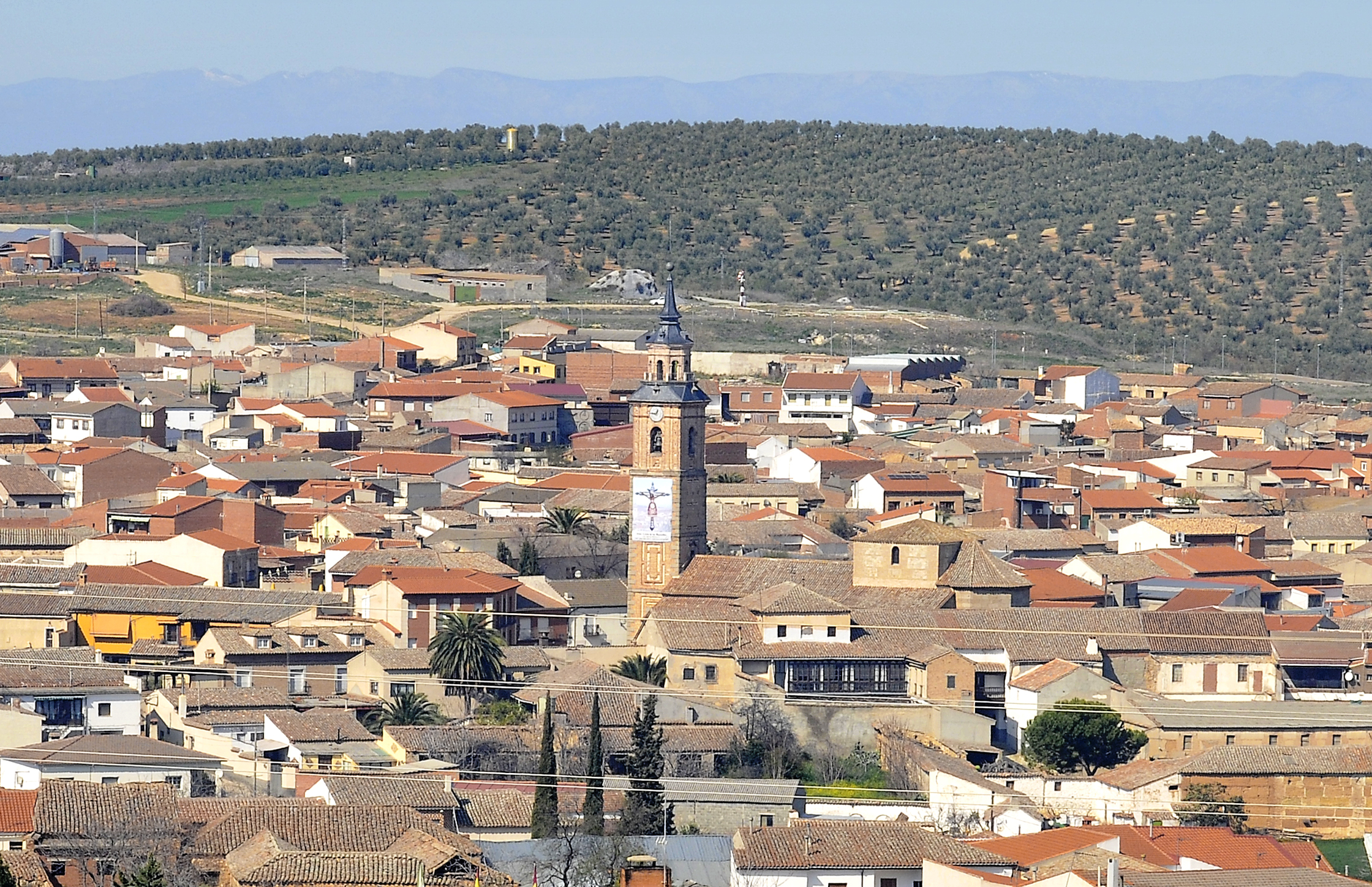
- View of Los Navalmorales from east of the town.

- Flag Coat of arms
- Interactive map of Los Navalmorales
- Country: Spain
- Autonomous community: Castile-La Mancha
- Province: Toledo
- Municipality: Los Navalmorales

Area
  - Total: 105 km^{2} (41 sq mi)
- Elevation: 579 m (1,900 ft)

Population (2025-01-01)
  - Total: 2,074
  - Density: 19.8/km^{2} (51.2/sq mi)
- Time zone: UTC+1 (CET)
  - Summer (DST): UTC+2 (CEST)

Los Navalmorales is a municipality located in the province of Toledo, Castile-La Mancha, Spain. According to the 2006 census (INE), the municipality has a population of 2636 inhabitants.
