= Aldeanueva de Barbarroya =

Coordinates: 39°45′N 5°01′W

Aldeanueva de Barbarroya, Spain
- Flag Coat of arms

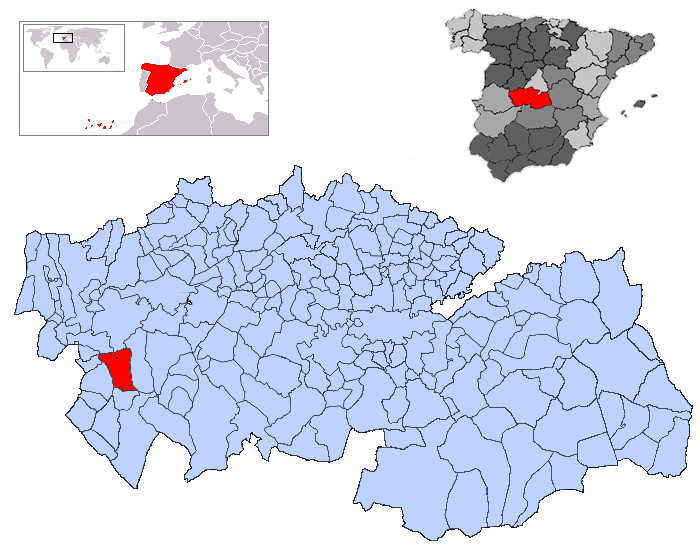
- Country: Spain
- Autonomous community: Castile-La Mancha
- Province: Toledo
- Municipality: Aldeanueva de Barbarroya

Area
  - Total: 92 km^{2} (36 sq mi)
- Elevation: 480 m (1,570 ft)

Population (2025-01-01)
  - Total: 456
  - Density: 5.0/km^{2} (13/sq mi)
- Time zone: UTC+1 (CET)
  - Summer (DST): UTC+2 (CEST)

Aldeanueva de Barbarroya is a municipality located in the province of Toledo, Castile-La Mancha, Spain. According to the 2018 census (INE), the municipality has a population of 542 inhabitants.

The municipality has a neighboring village known as Puerto Lasnuco.

== Demographics ==
Historical population
Year	Pop.	±%
1900	1,715	—
1910	1,878	+9.5%
1920	2,126	+13.2%
1930	2,531	+19.0%
1940	2,616	+3.4%
1950	2,943	+12.5%
1960	2,752	−6.5%
1970	1,540	−44.0%
1981	1,024	−33.5%
1991	893	−12.8%
2001	804	−10.0%
2011	654	−18.7%
2021	495	−24.3%
2023	452	−8.7%
Source: INE
