= La Pueblanueva =

Coordinates: 39°54′N 4°41′W

- municipality
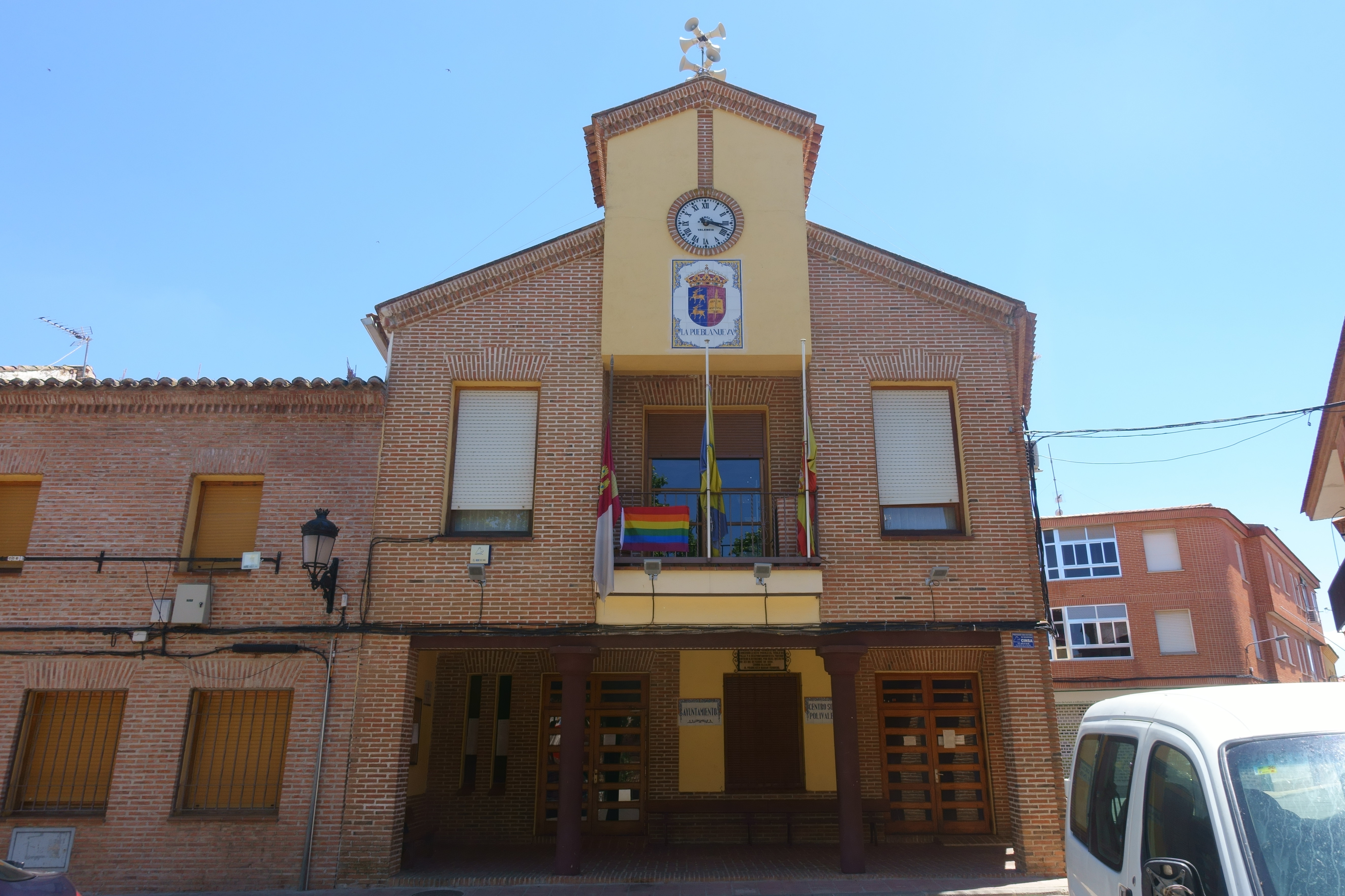

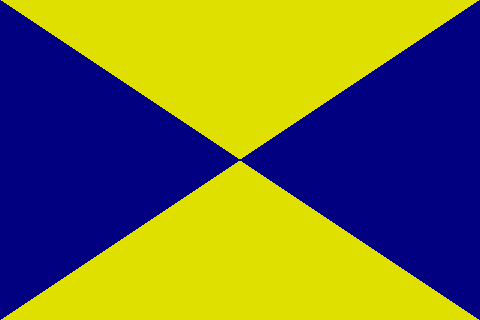
- Flag Coat of arms
- Interactive map of La Pueblanueva
- Country: Spain
- Autonomous community: Castile-La Mancha
- Province: Toledo
- Municipality: La Pueblanueva

Area
  - Total: 122 km^{2} (47 sq mi)
- Elevation: 481 m (1,578 ft)

Population (2025-01-01)
  - Total: 2,139
  - Density: 17.5/km^{2} (45.4/sq mi)
- Time zone: UTC+1 (CET)
  - Summer (DST): UTC+2 (CEST)

La Pueblanueva is a municipality located in the province of Toledo, Castile-La Mancha, Spain. According to the 2006 census (INE), the municipality has a population of 2145 inhabitants.
