= Alcaudete de la Jara =

- municipality
- Flag Coat of arms

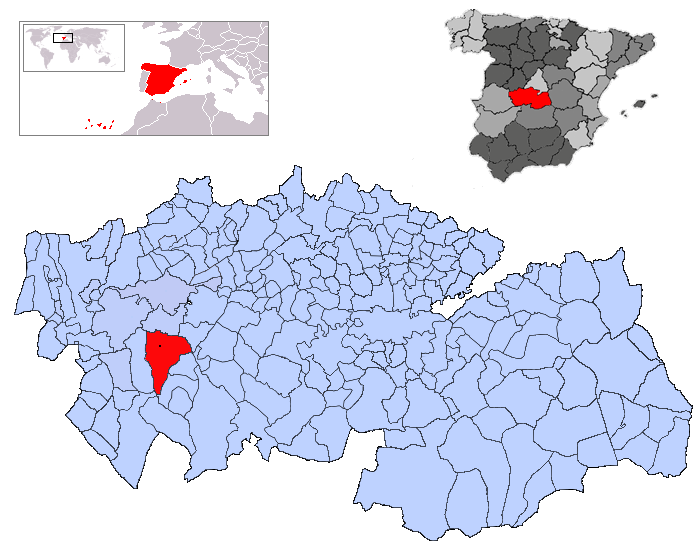

- Location in Castilla-La Mancha Location in Spain
- Coordinates: 39.790°N 4.872°W
- Country: Spain
- Autonomous community: Castile-La Mancha
- Province: Toledo

Area
  - Total: 156.12 km^{2} (60.28 sq mi)
- Elevation: 654 m (2,146 ft)

Population (2025-01-01)
  - Total: 1,720
  - Density: 11.0/km^{2} (28.5/sq mi)
- Time zone: UTC+1 (CET)
  - Summer (DST): UTC+2 (CEST)

Alcaudete de la Jara is a municipality located in the province of Toledo, Castile-La Mancha, Spain.

According to the 2018 census (INE), the municipality had a population of 1703 inhabitants.

== Demographics ==
Historical population
Year	Pop.	±%
1900	2,265	—
1910	2,549	+12.5%
1920	2,791	+9.5%
1930	3,284	+17.7%
1940	3,097	−5.7%
1950	3,575	+15.4%
1960	2,915	−18.5%
1970	2,113	−27.5%
1981	1,727	−18.3%
1991	1,410	−18.4%
2001	1,825	+29.4%
2011	2,089	+14.5%
2021	1,644	−21.3%
2023	1,640	−0.2%
Source: INE
