= Aldeanueva de San Bartolomé =

Coordinates: 39°38′N 5°07′W

Aldeanueva de San Bartolomé, Spain
- Flag Coat of arms
- Interactive map of Aldeanueva de San Bartolomé, Spain
- Country: Spain
- Autonomous community: Castile-La Mancha
- Province: Toledo
- Municipality: Aldeanueva de San Bartolomé

Area
  - Total: 35 km^{2} (14 sq mi)
- Elevation: 559 m (1,834 ft)

Population (2025-01-01)
  - Total: 404
  - Density: 12/km^{2} (30/sq mi)
- Time zone: UTC+1 (CET)
  - Summer (DST): UTC+2 (CEST)

Aldeanueva de San Bartolomé is a municipality located in the province of Toledo, Castile-La Mancha, Spain. According to the 2006 census (INE), the municipality has a population of 530 inhabitants.

== Demographics ==
Historical population
Year	Pop.	±%
1900	978	—
1910	1,089	+11.3%
1920	1,139	+4.6%
1930	1,330	+16.8%
1940	1,288	−3.2%
1950	1,393	+8.2%
1960	1,449	+4.0%
1970	1,291	−10.9%
1981	843	−34.7%
1991	597	−29.2%
2001	578	−3.2%
2011	509	−11.9%
2021	413	−18.9%
2023	414	+0.2%
Source: ISTAT
