= Robledo del Mazo =

- Municipality
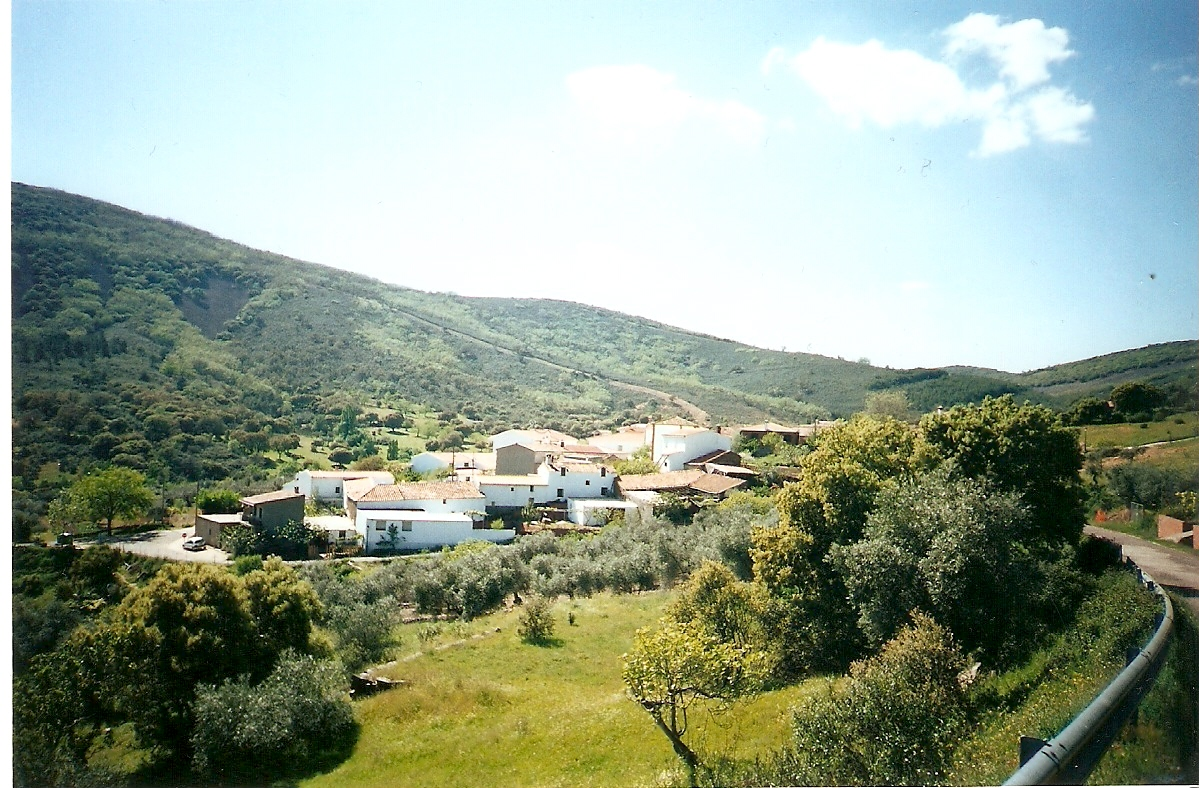

- Coat of arms

- Location in Spain
- Coordinates: 39°37′N 4°54′W
- Country: Spain
- Autonomous community: Castile-La Mancha
- Province: Toledo

Area
  - Total: 136 km^{2} (53 sq mi)
- Elevation: 737 m (2,418 ft)

Population (2025-01-01)
  - Total: 249
  - Density: 1.83/km^{2} (4.74/sq mi)
- Time zone: UTC+1 (CET)
  - Summer (DST): UTC+2 (CEST)

Robledo del Mazo is a municipality located in the province of Toledo, Castile-La Mancha, Spain. According to the 2006 census (INE), the municipality has a population of 399 inhabitants.

== Demographics ==
Historical population
Year	Pop.	±%
1900	1,005	—
1910	1,317	+31.0%
1920	1,380	+4.8%
1930	1,505	+9.1%
1940	1,612	+7.1%
1950	1,835	+13.8%
1960	1,734	−5.5%
1970	1,184	−31.7%
1981	781	−34.0%
1991	515	−34.1%
2001	503	−2.3%
2011	379	−24.7%
2021	260	−31.4%
2023	247	−5.0%
Source: INE
