= Province of Toledo =

Province of Spain

Province of Toledo Provincia de Toledo
- Province
- Flag Coat of arms

- Map of the Province of Toledo in Spain
- Coordinates: 39°48′N 4°9′W
- Country: Spain
- Autonomous community: Castilla–La Mancha
- Capital: Toledo
- Municipalities: 204

Government
  - Type: Diputación
  - Body: Provincial Deputation of Toledo

Area
  - Total: 15,369.34 km^{2} (5,934.14 sq mi)
  - Rank: 8th in Spain
- Highest elevation (Rocigalgo): 1,449 m (4,754 ft)

Population (2025)
  - Total: 755,081
  - Rank: 22nd in Spain
  - Density: 49.1290/km^{2} (127.244/sq mi)
- Time zone: UTC+1 (CET)
  - Summer (DST): UTC+2 (CEST)
- ISO 3166 code: ES-TO

The Province of Toledo (UK: /tɒˈleɪdoʊ/ tol-AY-doh; Spanish: Provincia de Toledo [toˈleðo]) is a province of central Spain, in the western part of the autonomous community of Castile–La Mancha. It is bordered by the provinces of Madrid, Cuenca, Ciudad Real, Badajoz, Cáceres, and Ávila. Its capital is the city of Toledo.

It has a population of 755,081 in an area of 15,369.34 square kilometres (5,934.14 sq mi) across its 204 municipalities.

== Geography ==
The province shares the Parque Nacional de Cabañeros with the province of Ciudad Real. The Corocho de Rocigalgo, located in the Montes de Toledo, is the highest point of the province (1,448 m). The Tagus crosses the province from the northeast to the west. Some right-bank tributaries are the Guadarrama, the Alberche, or the Tiétar.

== Administration ==
=== Provincial government and administration ===
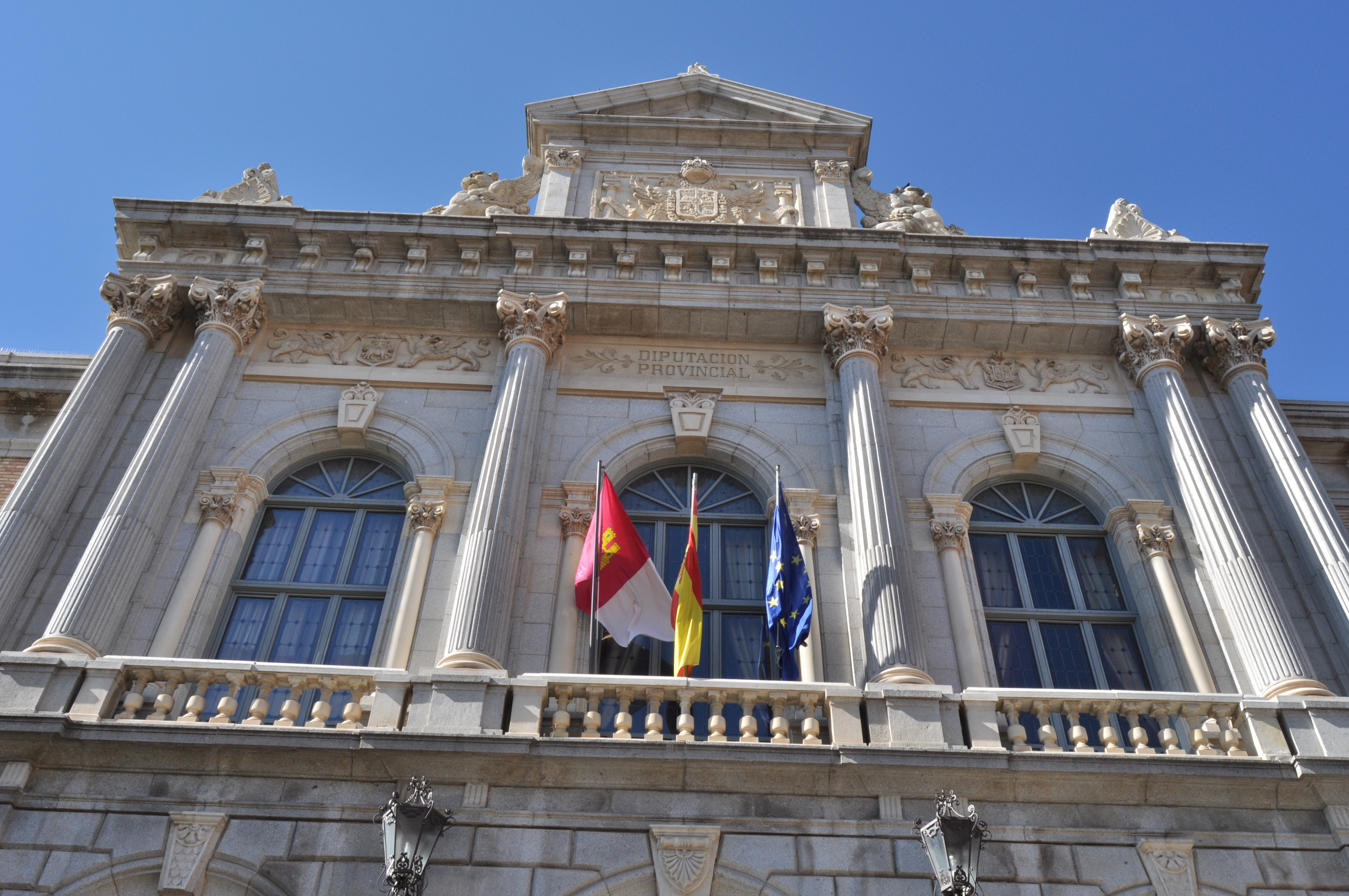
Seat of the provincial deputation.

The government body of the province is the Provincial Deputation of Toledo. Its seat is located at Toledo. The members of the plenary of the deputation (diputación) are indirectly elected from among the municipal councillors in the province based on the results of the municipal elections. In turn, the plenary elects the president of the deputation from among its members.

=== Representation of the Central Government ===
The Government of Spain appoints a Government Sub-delegate for the province, whose headquarters are located at Toledo. The Government Delegate charged with the representation in the whole autonomous community of Castile–La Mancha also has its seat in Toledo.

=== Municipalities ===
The province has 204 municipalities:

- Ajofrín
- Alameda de la Sagra
- Albarreal de Tajo
- Alcabón
- Alcañizo
- Alcaudete de la Jara
- Alcolea de Tajo
- Aldea en Cabo
- Aldeanueva de Barbarroya
- Aldeanueva de San Bartolomé
- Almendral de la Cañada
- Almonacid de Toledo
- Almorox
- Añover de Tajo
- Arcicóllar
- Argés
- Azután
- Barcience
- Bargas
- Belvís de la Jara
- Borox
- Buenaventura
- Burguillos de Toledo
- Burujón
- Cabañas de la Sagra
- Cabañas de Yepes
- Cabezamesada
- Calera y Chozas
- Caleruela
- Calzada de Oropesa
- Camarena
- Camarenilla
- El Campillo de la Jara
- Camuñas
- Cardiel de los Montes
- Carmena
- El Carpio de Tajo
- Carranque
- Carriches
- El Casar de Escalona
- Casarrubios del Monte
- Casasbuenas
- Castillo de Bayuela
- Cazalegas
- Cebolla
- Cedillo del Condado
- Los Cerralbos
- Cervera de los Montes
- Chozas de Canales
- Chueca
- Ciruelos
- Cobeja
- Cobisa
- Consuegra
- Corral de Almaguer
- Cuerva
- Domingo Pérez
- Dosbarrios
- Erustes
- Escalona
- Escalonilla
- Espinoso del Rey
- Esquivias
- La Estrella
- Fuensalida
- Gálvez
- Garciotum
- Gerindote
- Guadamur
- La Guardia
- Las Herencias
- Herreruela de Oropesa
- Hinojosa de San Vicente
- Hontanar
- Hormigos
- Huecas
- Huerta de Valdecarábanos
- La Iglesuela del Tiétar
- Illán de Vacas
- Illescas
- Lagartera
- Layos
- Lillo
- Lominchar
- Lucillos
- Madridejos
- Magán
- Malpica de Tajo
- Manzaneque
- Maqueda
- Marjaliza
- Marrupe
- Mascaraque
- La Mata
- Mazarambroz
- Mejorada
- Menasalbas
- Méntrida
- Mesegar de Tajo
- Miguel Esteban
- Mocejón
- Mohedas de la Jara
- Montearagón
- Montesclaros
- Mora
- Nambroca
- La Nava de Ricomalillo
- Navahermosa
- Navalcán
- Navalmoralejo
- Los Navalmorales
- Los Navalucillos
- Navamorcuende
- Noblejas
- Noez
- Nombela
- Novés
- Numancia de la Sagra
- Nuño Gómez
- Ocaña
- Olías del Rey
- Ontígola
- Orgaz
- Oropesa
- Otero
- Palomeque
- Pantoja
- Paredes de Escalona
- Parrillas
- Pelahustán
- Pepino
- Polán
- Portillo de Toledo
- La Puebla de Almoradiel
- La Puebla de Montalbán
- La Pueblanueva
- El Puente del Arzobispo
- Puerto de San Vicente
- Pulgar
- Quero
- Quintanar de la Orden
- Quismondo
- El Real de San Vicente
- Recas
- Retamoso de la Jara
- Rielves
- Robledo del Mazo
- El Romeral
- San Bartolomé de las Abiertas
- San Martín de Montalbán
- San Martín de Pusa
- San Pablo de los Montes
- San Román de los Montes
- Santa Ana de Pusa
- Santa Cruz de la Zarza
- Santa Cruz del Retamar
- Santa Olalla
- Santo Domingo-Caudilla
- Sartajada
- Segurilla
- Seseña
- Sevilleja de la Jara
- Sonseca
- Sotillo de las Palomas
- Talavera de la Reina
- Tembleque
- El Toboso
- Toledo
- Torralba de Oropesa
- Torrecilla de la Jara
- La Torre de Esteban Hambrán
- Torrico
- Torrijos
- Totanés
- Turleque
- Ugena
- Urda
- Valdeverdeja
- Valmojado
- Velada
- Las Ventas con Peña Aguilera
- Las Ventas de Retamosa
- Las Ventas de San Julián
- Villacañas
- La Villa de Don Fadrique
- Villafranca de los Caballeros
- Villaluenga de la Sagra
- Villamiel de Toledo
- Villaminaya
- Villamuelas
- Villanueva de Alcardete
- Villanueva de Bogas
- Villarejo de Montalbán
- Villarrubia de Santiago
- Villaseca de la Sagra
- Villasequilla
- Villatobas
- El Viso de San Juan
- Los Yébenes
- Yeles
- Yepes
- Yuncler
- Yunclillos
- Yuncos

== Coat of arms ==
Since 2013, the province of Toledo uses the arms of the city, the imperial double-headed eagle Sable bearing an escutcheon with the arms of Castile and Leon, party per pale with the arms of the former Kingdom of Toledo. The eagle is flanked by the pillars of Hercules.

== Demographics ==
As of 2025, the population is 755,081, of which 50.3% are males, and 49.7% are females. Minors make up 18.5% of the population, and seniors make up 18.8%.

Historical population

Year	Pop.	±%
1842	246,556	—
1857	328,755	+33.3%
1877	333,971	+1.6%
1887	356,398	+6.7%
1900	380,025	+6.6%
1910	417,921	+10.0%
1920	450,601	+7.8%
1930	496,510	+10.2%
1940	490,385	−1.2%

Year	Pop.	±%
1950	533,654	+8.8%
1960	532,583	−0.2%
1970	477,732	−10.3%
1981	474,634	−0.6%
1991	489,543	+3.1%
2001	541,379	+10.6%
2011	705,516	+30.3%
2021	710,400	+0.7%

Source: INE

=== Immigration ===
As of 2025, immigrants make up 17.2% of the population. The 5 largest foreign countries of birth are Morocco, Romania, Colombia, Venezuela, and Peru.

== Bibliography ==
- Mingo Llorente, Adolfo de. "Del Alberche al Río Bravo: Ríos toledanos en el cine".
