= Fountain of Cybele =

Monumental fountain in Madrid

- Spanish: Fuente de Cibeles
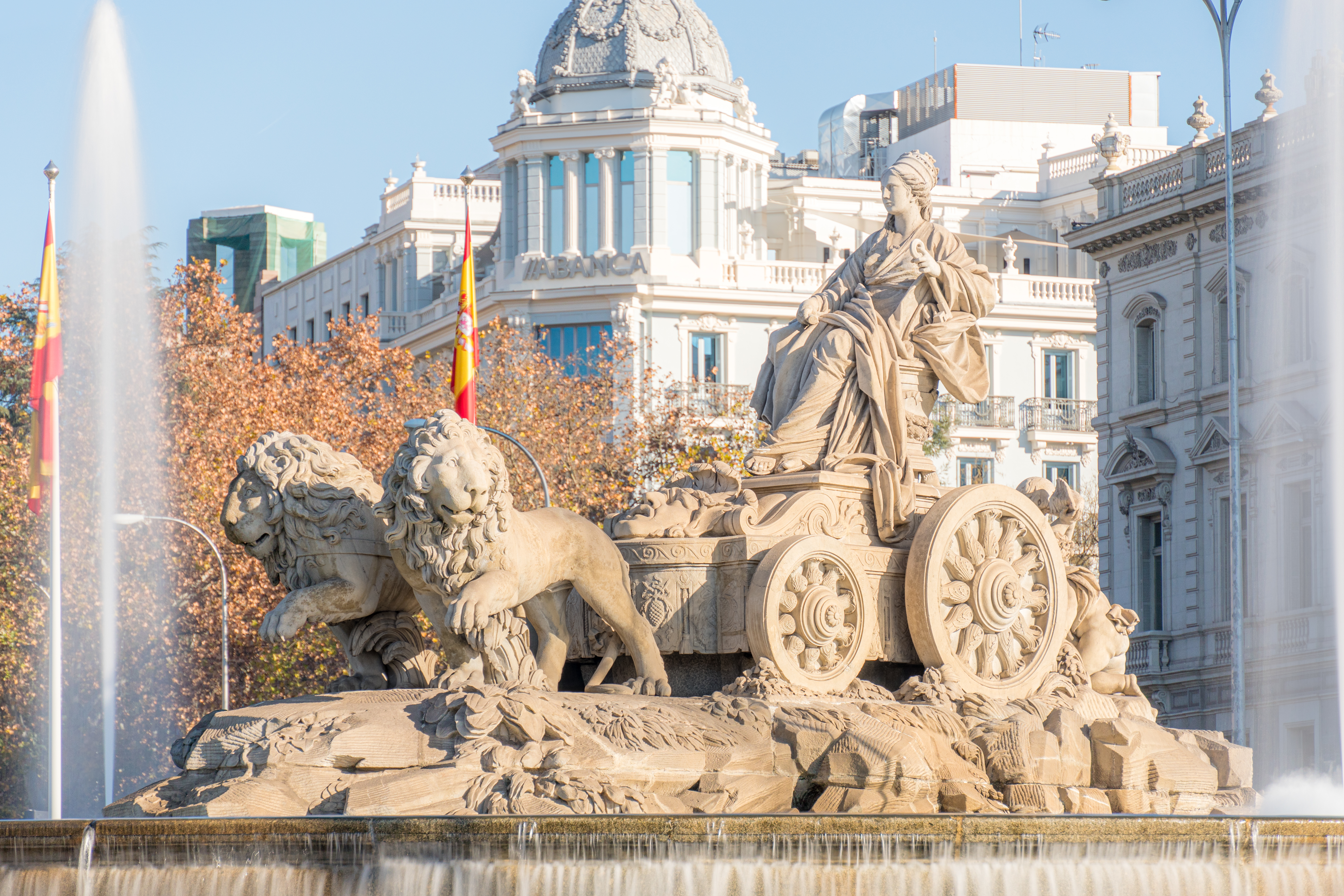
- The fountain in 2024
- Artist: Francisco Gutiérrez (sculptor); Roberto Michel (sculptor); Ventura Rodríguez (designer)
- Medium: White marble
- Movement: Neoclassicism
- Subject: Cybele
- Location: Plaza de Cibeles, Madrid, Spain
- 40.419345°N 3.693081°W

The Fountain of Cybele (Spanish: Fuente de Cibeles, or simply, La Cibeles) is a neoclassical fountain in Madrid, Spain. It lies on the centre of the Plaza de Cibeles. The sculptural group in its centre represents Cybele, a Phrygian earth and fertility deity. It has become one of the icons of the city.

== History and description ==
Designed and commissioned by Ventura Rodríguez in 1780, the sculptural group—made of white marble from Montesclaros— is a work by Francisco Gutiérrez (goddess) and Roberto Michel (the lions).

Crowned by a mural crown, the goddess rides a chariot pulled by two lions, representing Atalanta and Hippomenes.

It was moved to its current location and orientation in 1895.

It has a maximum water capacity of 278 m^{3}.

The fountain is the site where Real Madrid's supporters and players gather to celebrate the team's trophies as well as partakers of the successes of the Spain national football team. The goddess lost a hand in 1994, following a celebration of a victory of the Spanish national team. The goddess lost another one of her hands on 21 September 2002.

The Fountain of Cybele has a replica, the namesake Fuente de Cibeles, located in Mexico City and inaugurated in 1980.
