= Mejorada =

Village in Castile-La Mancha, Spain

Coordinates: 40°01′N 4°53′W

Mejorada, Spain
- Flag Coat of arms
- Interactive map of Mejorada, Spain
- Country: Spain
- Autonomous community: Castile-La Mancha
- Province: Toledo
- Municipality: Mejorada

Area
  - Total: 46 km^{2} (18 sq mi)
- Elevation: 548 m (1,798 ft)

Population (2025-01-01)
  - Total: 1,387
  - Density: 30/km^{2} (78/sq mi)
- Time zone: UTC+1 (CET)
  - Summer (DST): UTC+2 (CEST)

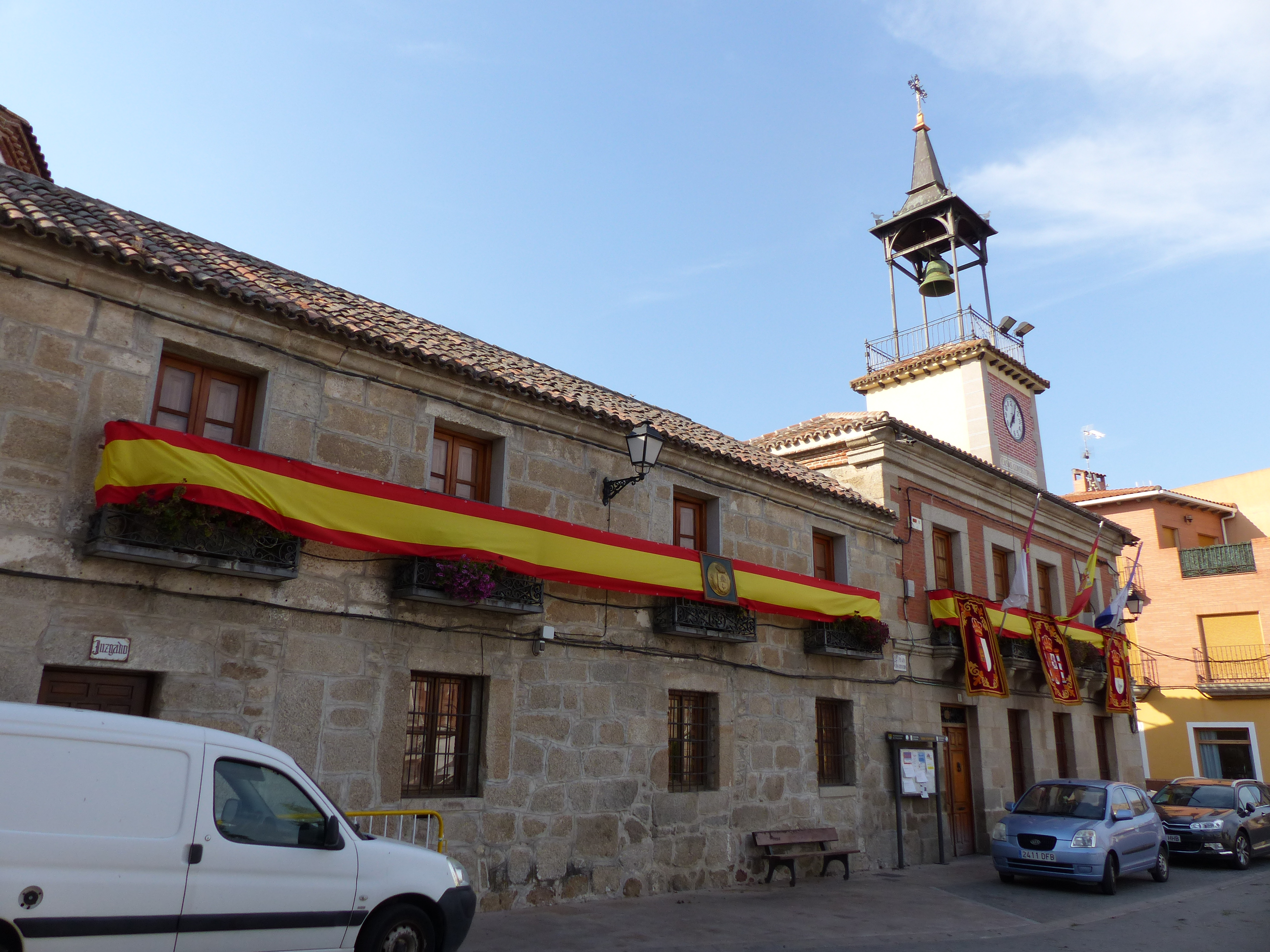
Mejorada Town Hall Building

Mejorada is a village located in the province of Toledo, Castile-La Mancha, Spain. According to the 2017 census (INE), the municipality has a population of 2,809 inhabitants.

== Name ==
At the beginning the village was called 'Malpartida' (Badly distributed in Spanish) because of the trouble to fit it into the lands of Ávila, Oropesa or Talavera. In the 14th century, along with the expansion of its territories, the name Malpartida was finally changed for 'Mejorada' (Improved in Spanish) due to the improvements made on its territorial situation and to relieve the villagers who thought the previous name brought bad luck.

== Location ==
Located 9 km north of Talavera de la Reina, the village is settled in the region of the 'Sierra de San Vicente', which is a subregion of Talavera. Mejorada adjoins Montesclaros to the North, Segurilla to the East, Talavera to the South and Velada to the West.

It is located in the area enclosed between the Tagus river and the Tiétar river, a place called 'El Berrocal'

The Guadyerbas River sets the northern frontier of the territory, and several streams, the largest being the Riolobos.

== Main sights and monuments ==
=== The Castle ===
Mejorada holds the ruins of a castle placed around 250 meters (800 ft.) southeast of the village center.

It is supposed to have been built on the 13th century, linked to the creation of the Estate of Mejorada, when king Sancho IV of Castile gave the village to the knight Juan García de Toledo in July 1288, who would become the first Lord of Mejorada.

The fortress was built to enforce the lords of the village against the council of Talavera. The castle would then become the main symbol of the strength of nobility opposite the ecclesiastical power.

The castle is built on a 78 feet side square with rounded turrets on each corner. The main entrance is placed looking west, in which wall there is a great mid medieval rectangular keep. The masonry and brick walls are approximately 5 feet thick.

Nowadays the manor is in ruins, only lasting two walls and part of the other two.

=== Parish church of Nuestra Señora de la Asunción ===
The Church was made almost entirely of lime and stone which is very typical on the area, and dates back from the 15th century. It's devoted to Nuestra Señora de la Asunción (Assumption of Our Lady).

It's a single nave with transept temple, with a two levels tower facing West, the chancel facing East and the main façade facing south. The ceiling is coffered with wooden beams in twos arranged slantwise creating the shape of the roof.

=== Watchover ===
The Watchtower is situated 2000 ft (600m) south from the city centre, on the summit of the Atalaya Hill at around 1900 ft (580m) high. The tower has a 5.5 ft (1.70m) circular floor-plan with a current height of 9.2 ft (2.80m) made of masonry and lime and sand mortar.

This Watchtower was part of an ensemble of lookout watchtowers along with the ones on Velada, El Casar, Segurilla, Cardiel, etc. built probably during the Islamic times and then reused by the Christians until the Middle Ages.

From the Watchtower you have full view of the valley made by the Tagus river to the South, and the Guadyerbas river to the North. You can also catch sight of the watchtowers at El Casar to the West and Segurilla to the East; and the Castle of Mejorada, which is around 1450 ft (540m) North.

== Festivals ==
- 15 de mayo: Isidore the Laborer, there known as San Isidro
- Last weekend of August: Cristo de la Tabla
