= Montesclaros =

- municipality
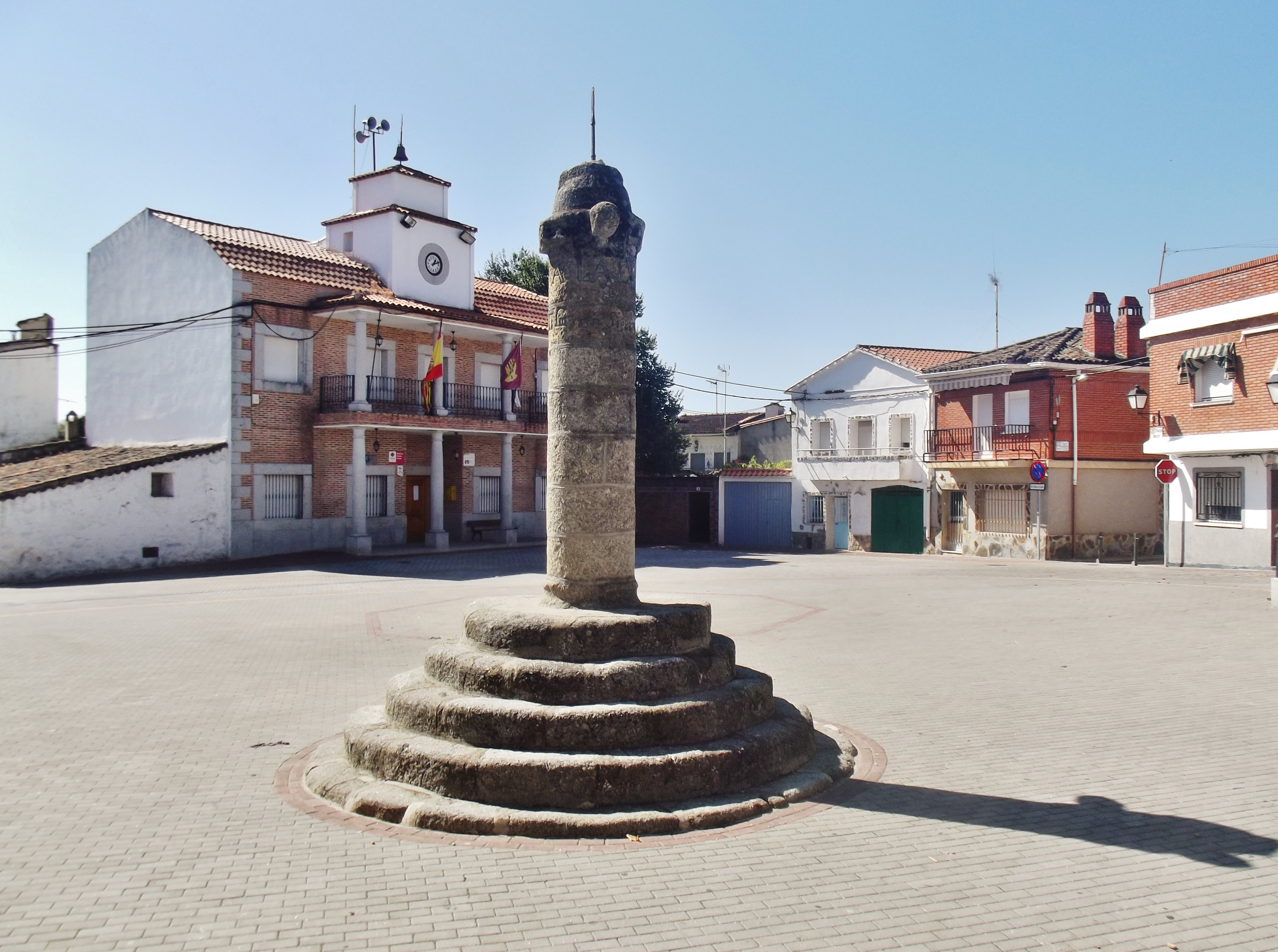
- Main Square of Montesclaros

- Coat of arms
- Interactive map of Montesclaros
- Coordinates: 40°06′N 4°56′W
- Country: Spain
- Autonomous community: Castile-La Mancha
- Province: Toledo
- Municipality: Montesclaros

Area
  - Total: 21 km^{2} (8.1 sq mi)
- Elevation: 558 m (1,831 ft)

Population (2025-01-01)
  - Total: 377
  - Density: 18/km^{2} (46/sq mi)
- Time zone: UTC+1 (CET)
  - Summer (DST): UTC+2 (CEST)

Montesclaros is a municipality located in the province of Toledo, Castile-La Mancha, Spain. According to the 2006 census (INE), the municipality had a population of 406 inhabitants.

The town borders Hontanares to the north; Navamorcuende to the east; Cervera de los Montes, Segurilla, and Mejorada to the south; and Velada to the west.

It is known for its marble quarries.

== History ==
Prior to its settlement, the site of Montesclaros was a pasture called Anadinos in Higueruela de las Dueñas. Montesclaros was not populated until February 1491 when it acquired the title of Villa thanks to María de Luna, the daughter and rich heir of the Constable of Castile, Álvaro de Luna. María de Luna wanted to suppress the robberies and deaths that occurred in the nearby mountains. Fifteen residents of Navamorcuende were given the rights to relocate to Montesclaros.
