= Palace of Linares =

Cultural property in Madrid, Spain

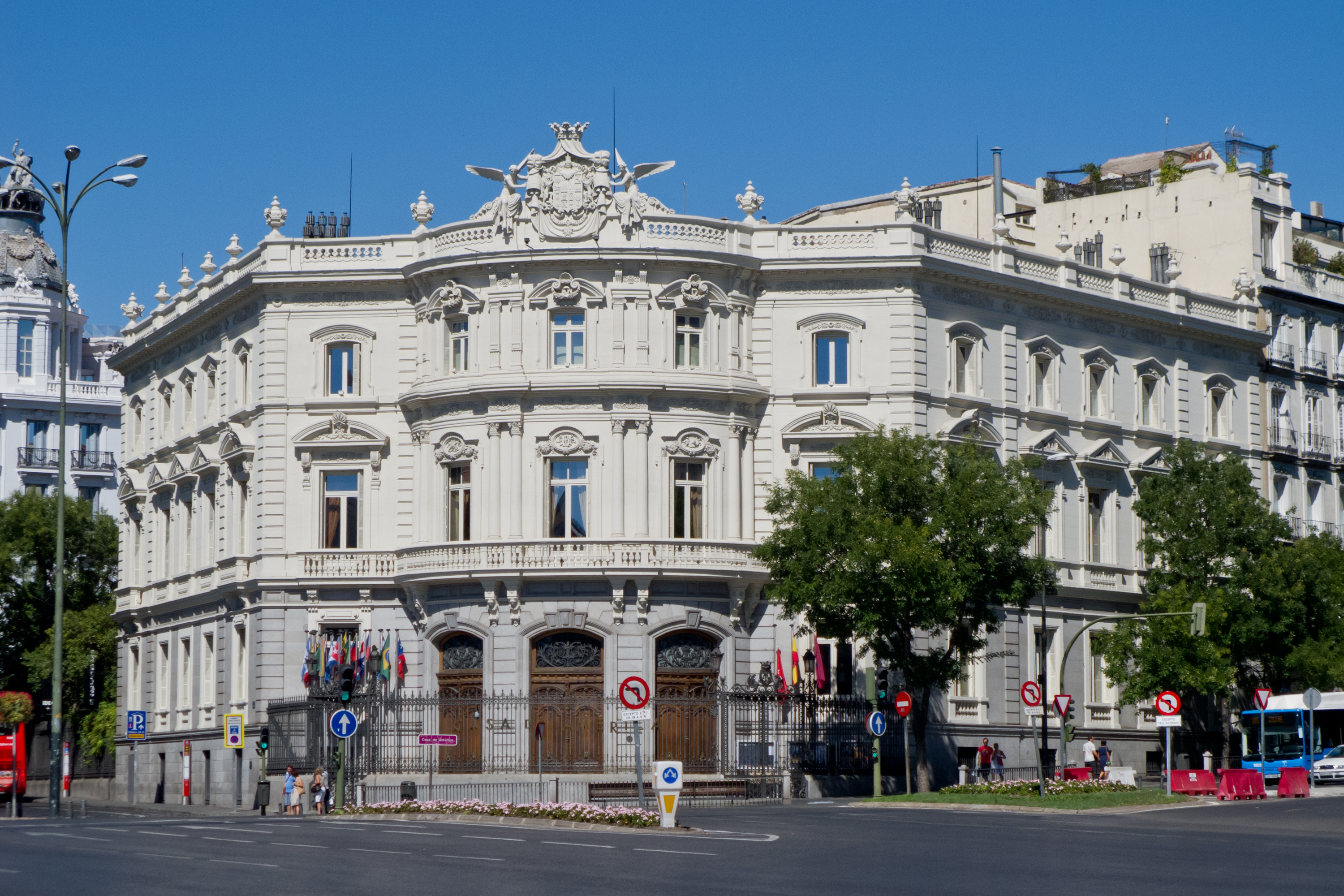
- Interactive map of the Palace of Linares area

General information
- Location: Plaza de Cibeles, 62, Madrid, Spain
- Coordinates: 40.419821°N 3.692245°W

The Palace of Linares (Spanish: Palacio de Linares) is a palace located in Madrid, Spain. It was declared national historic-artistic monument (precursor of the status of Bien de Interés Cultural) in 1976. Located at the plaza de Cibeles. It is the seat of the Casa de América.

== Gallery ==
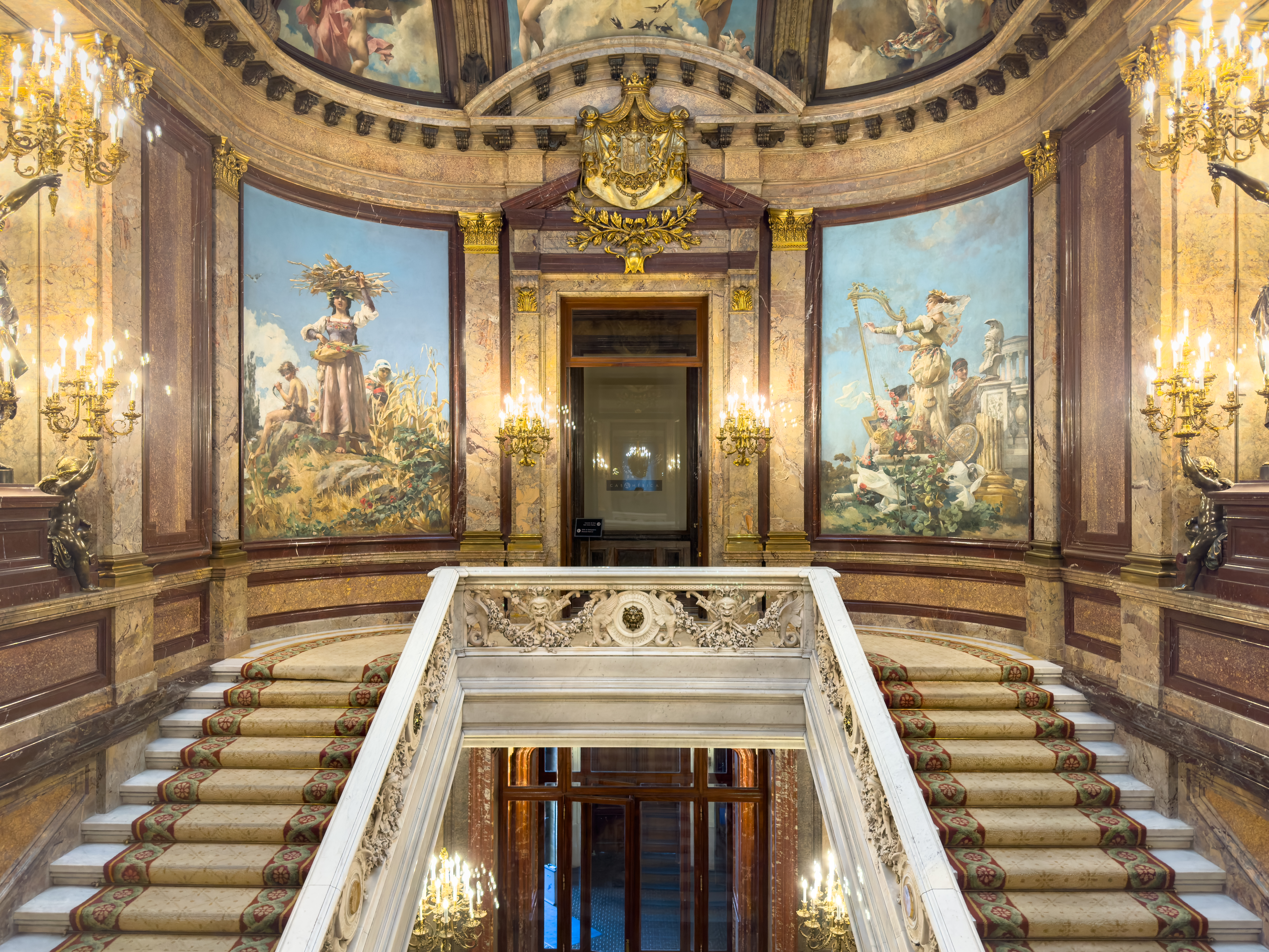

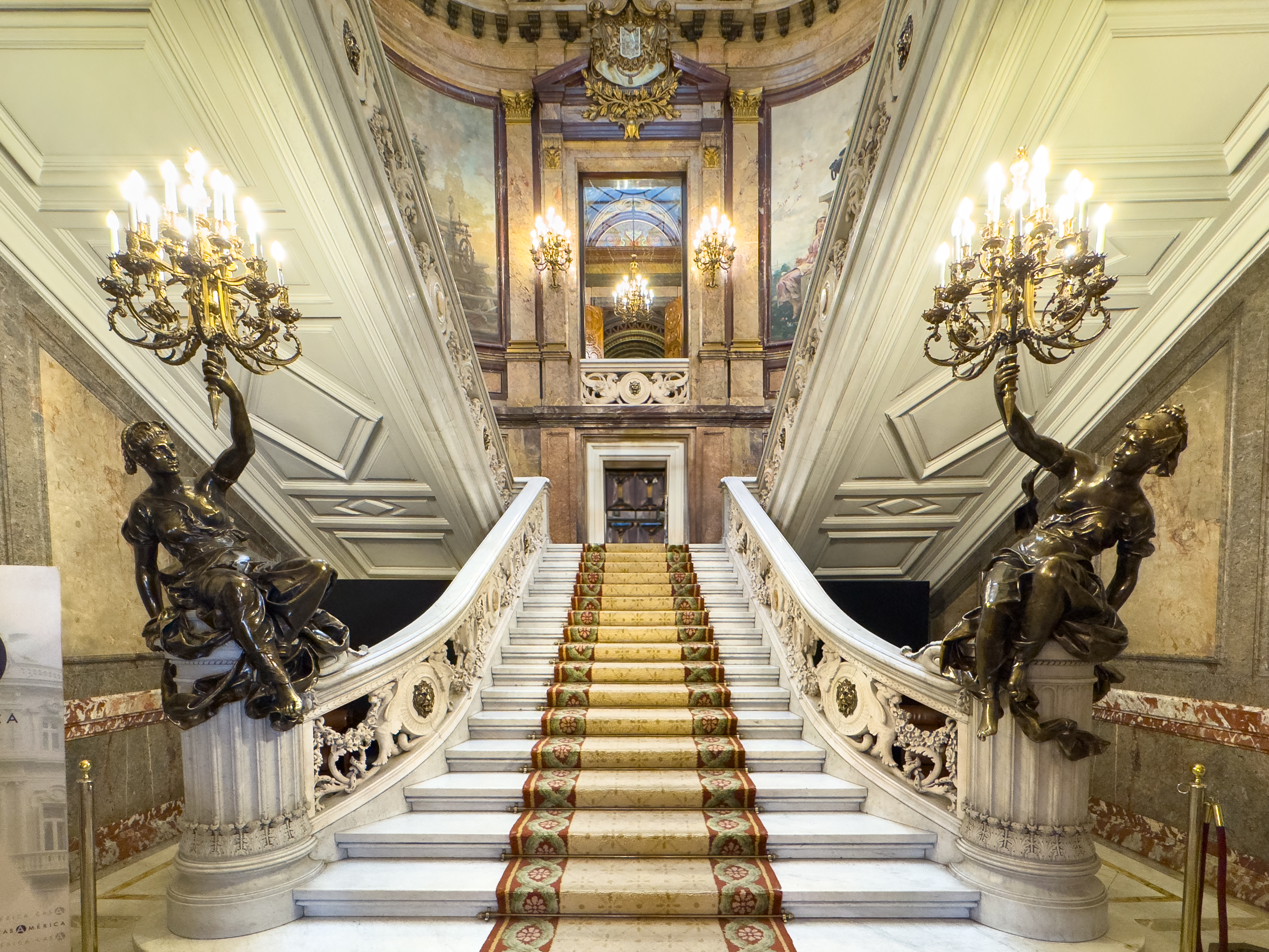

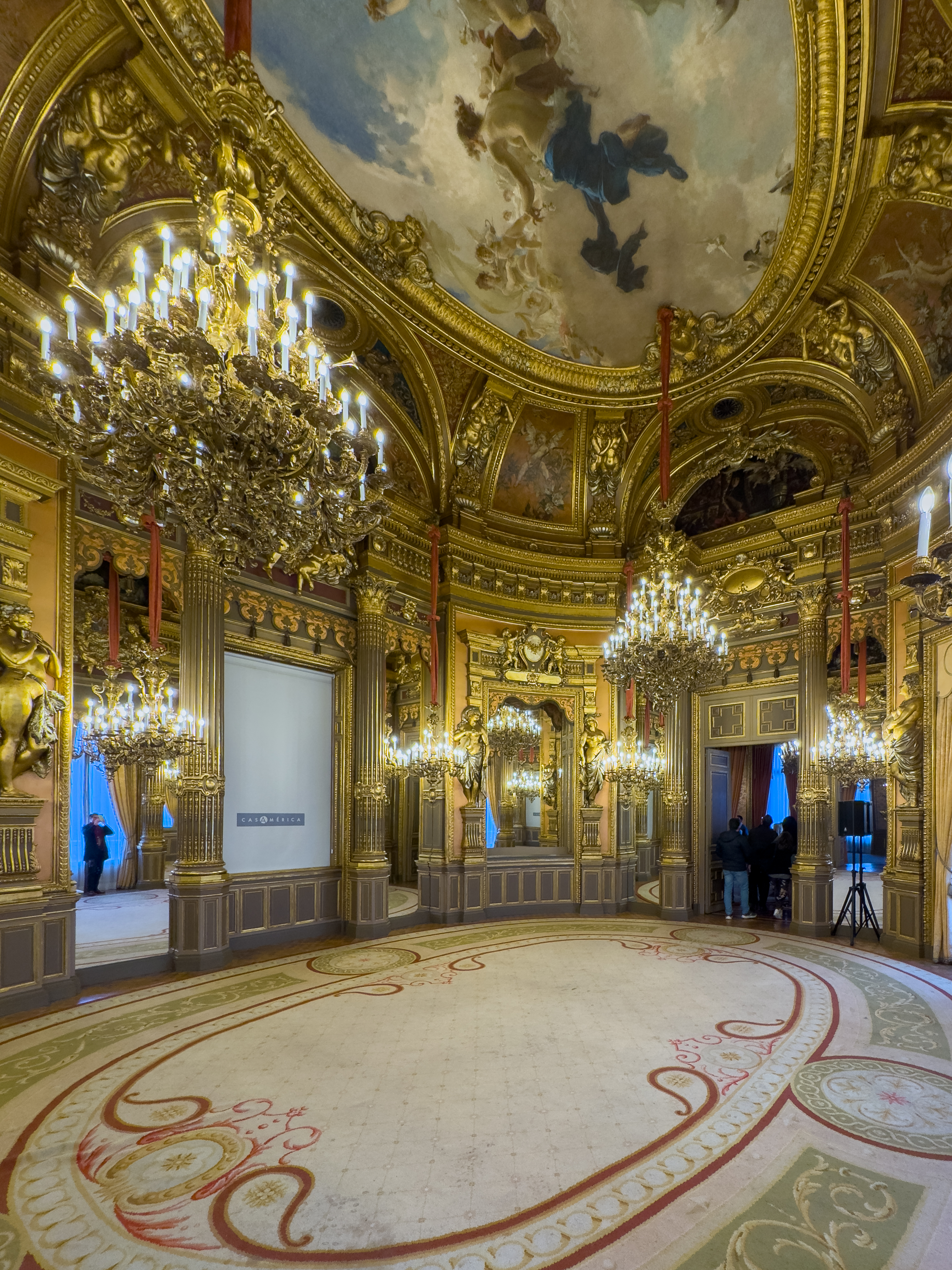

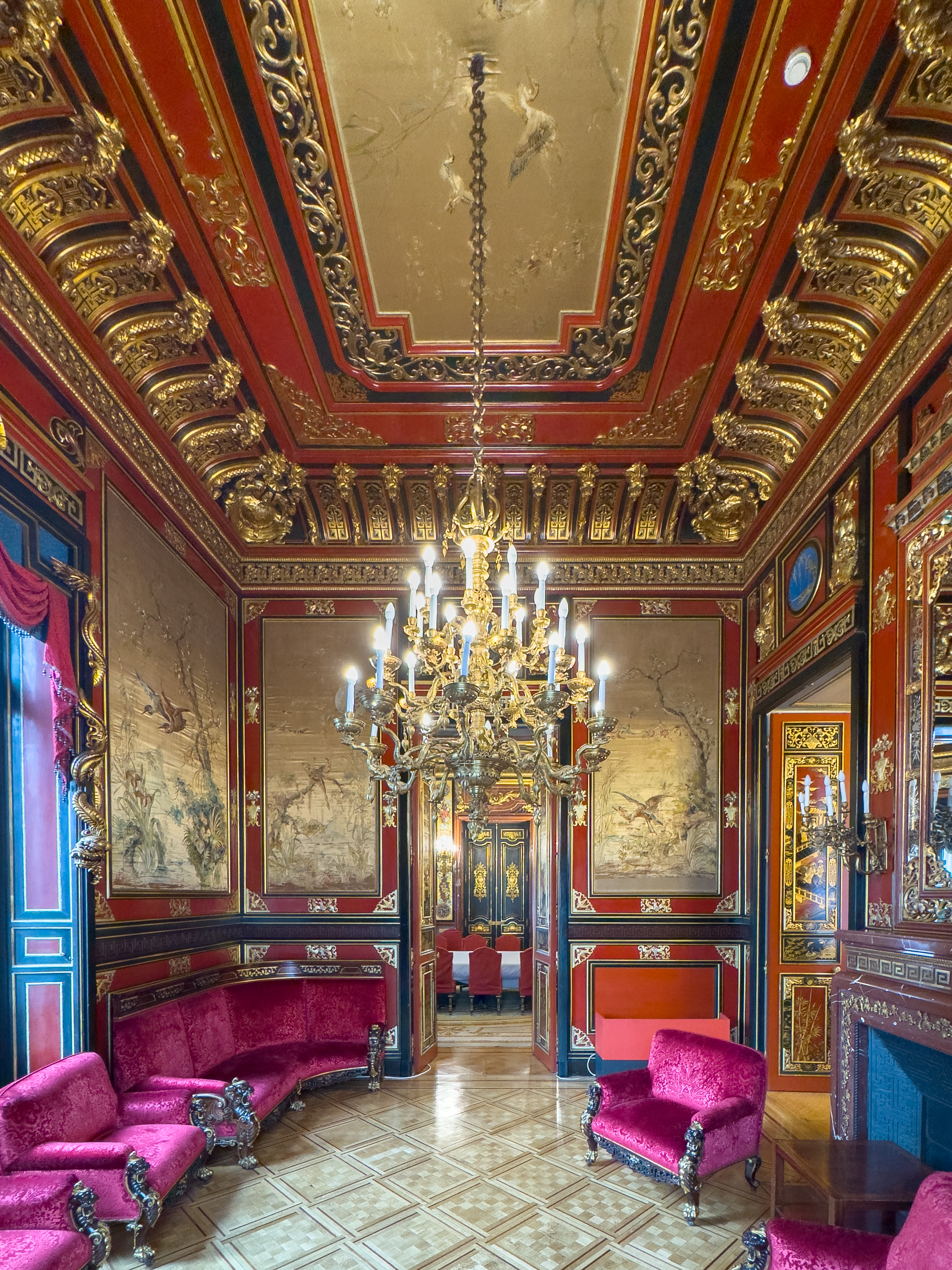

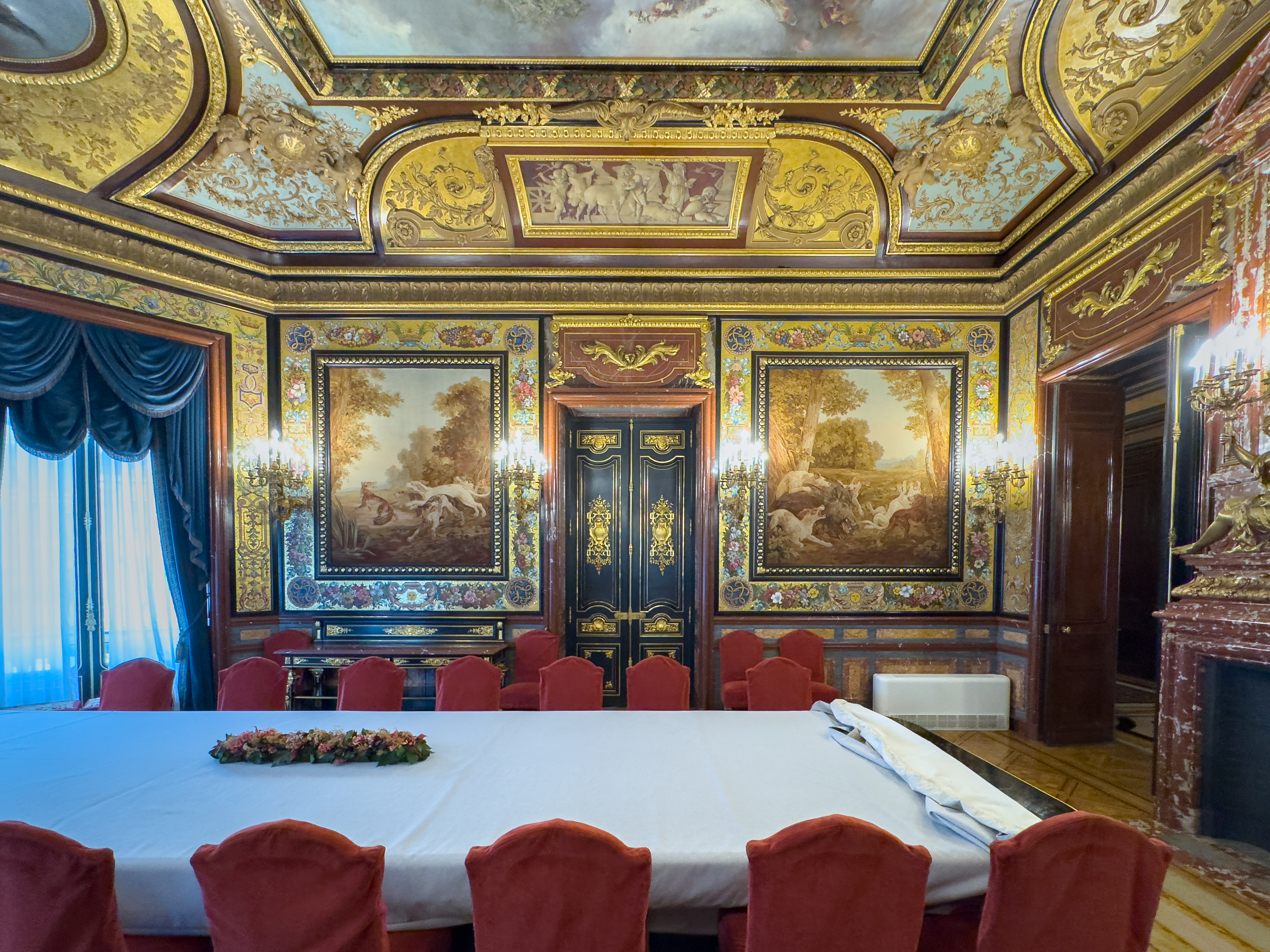

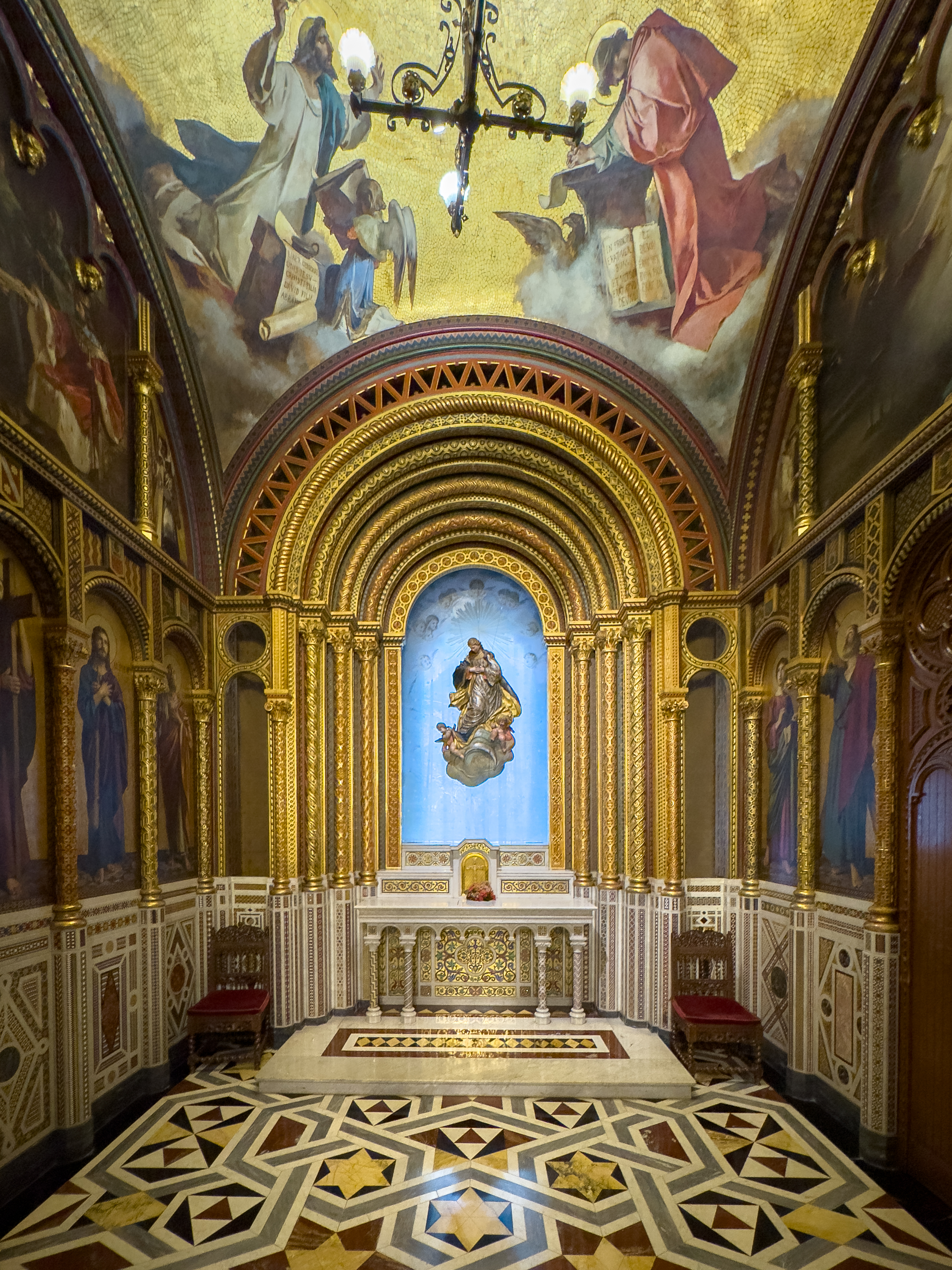

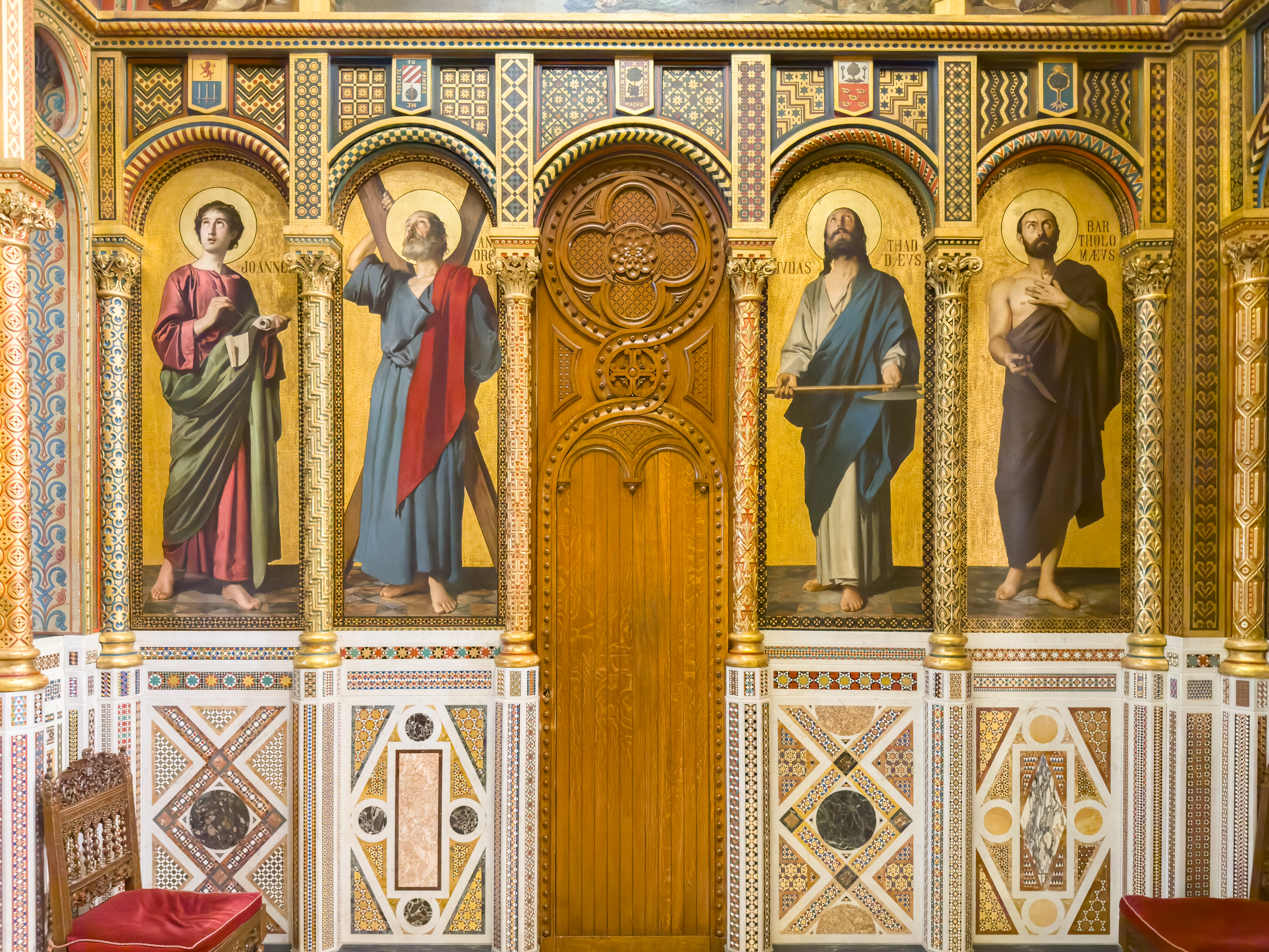

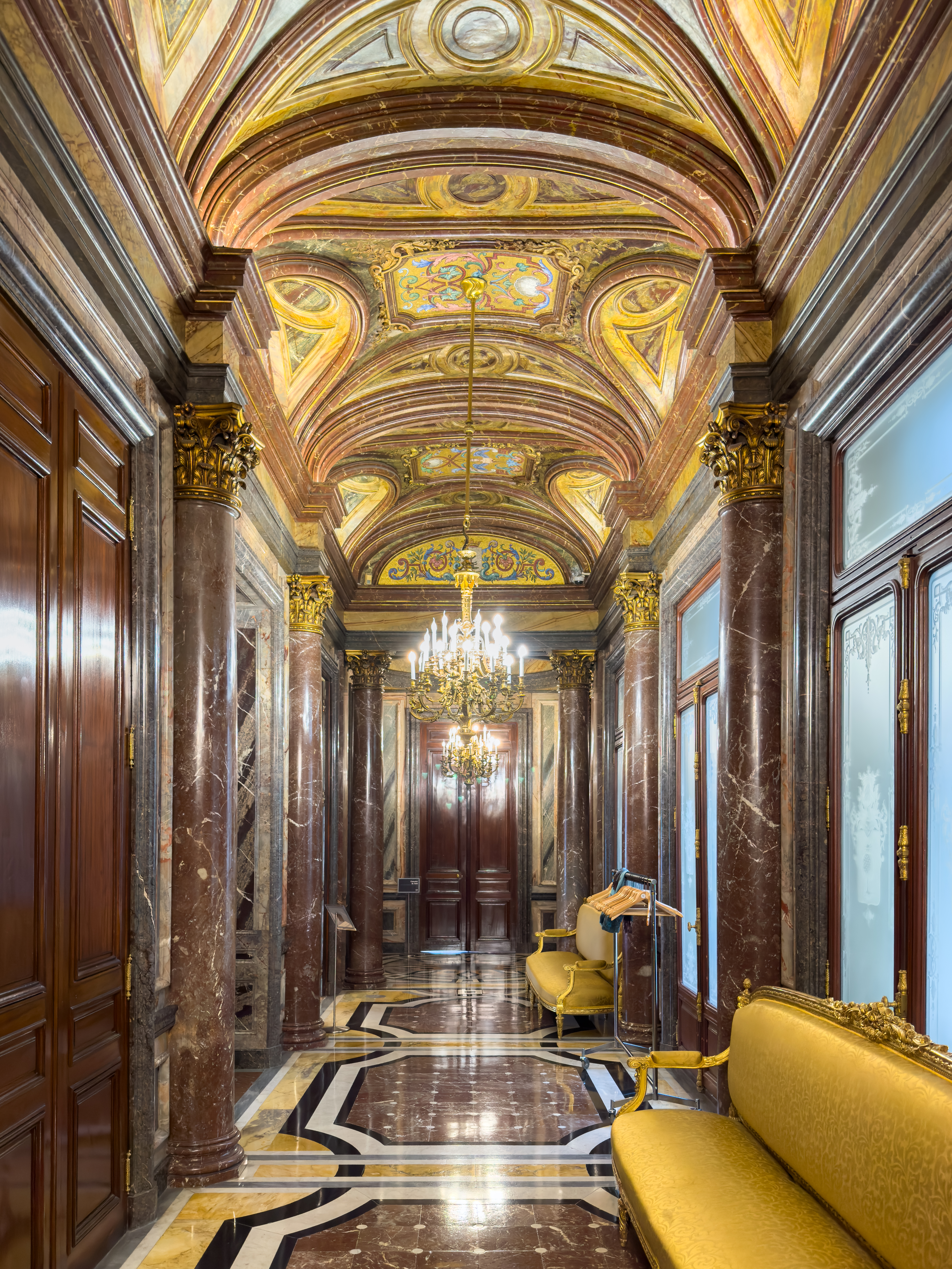

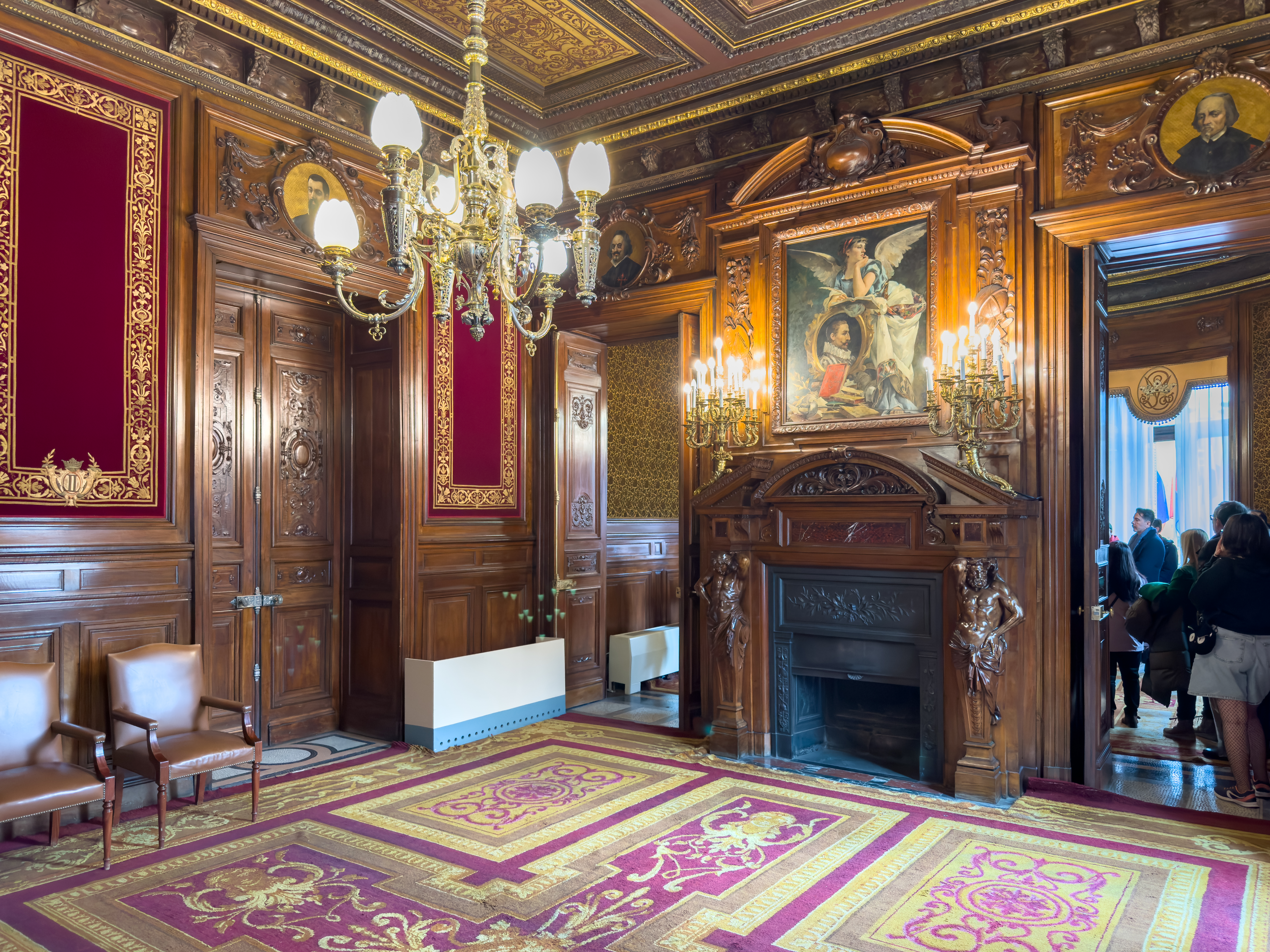

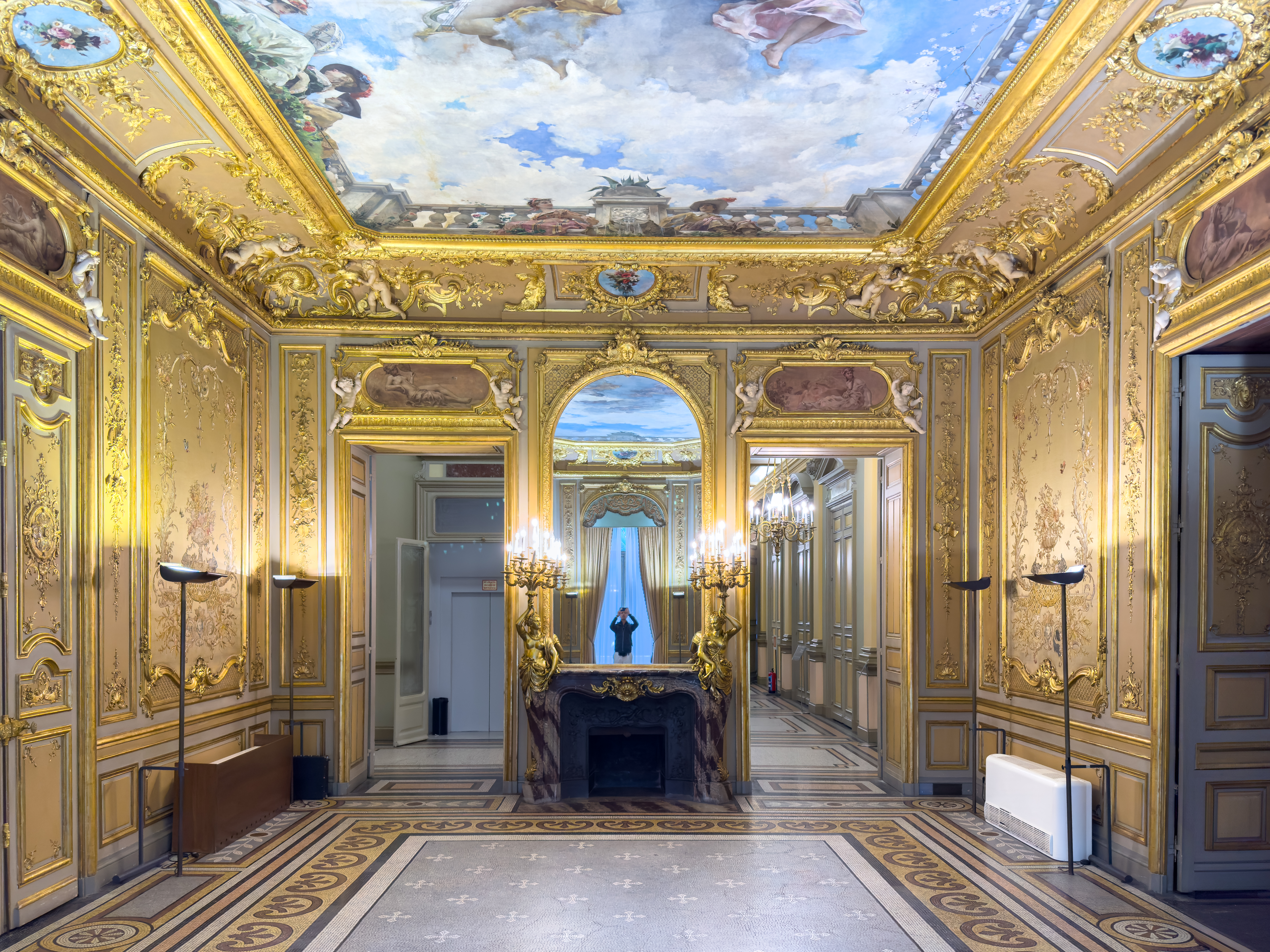

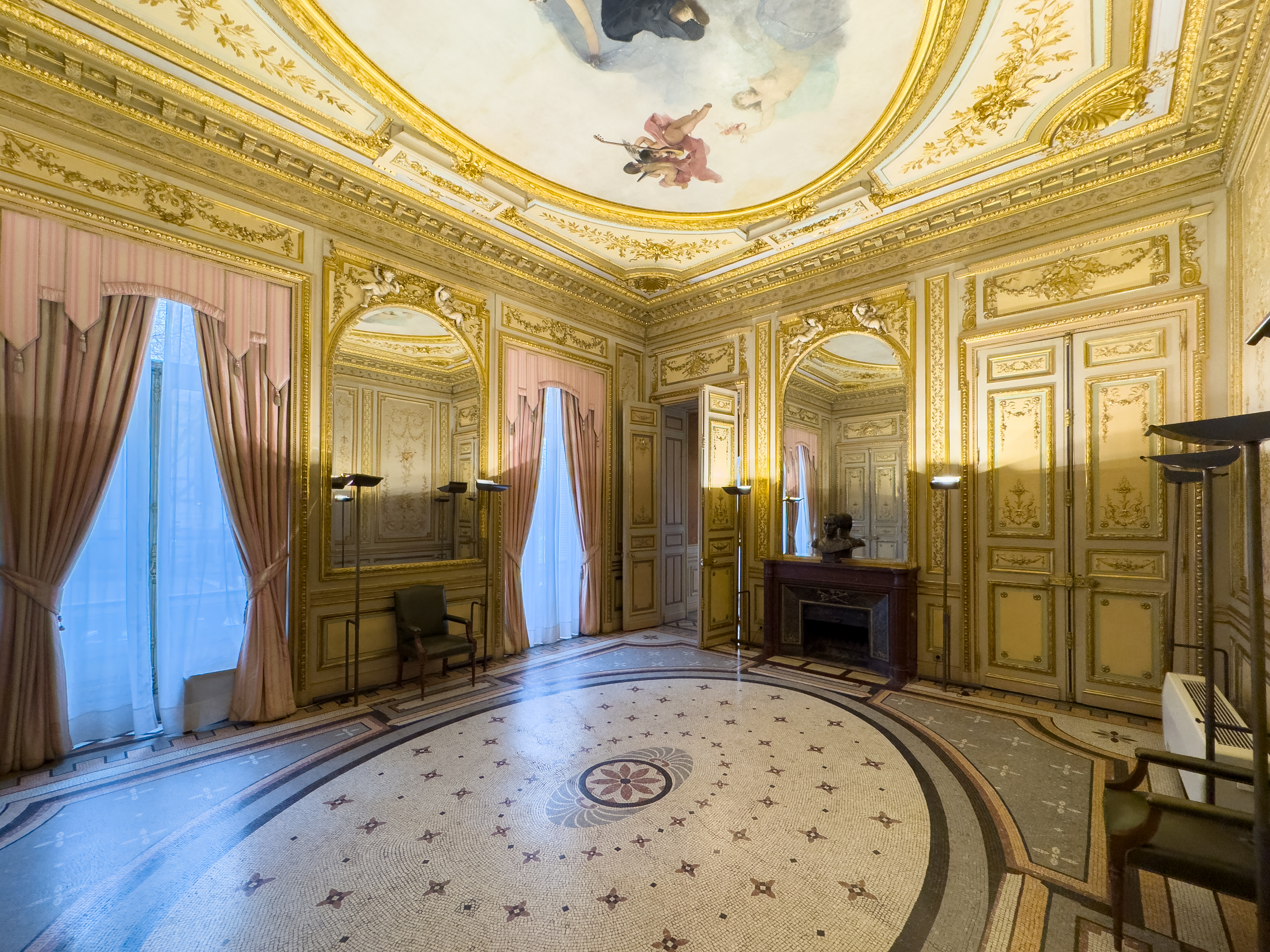
