= Bel Borba =

Brazilian graphic artist

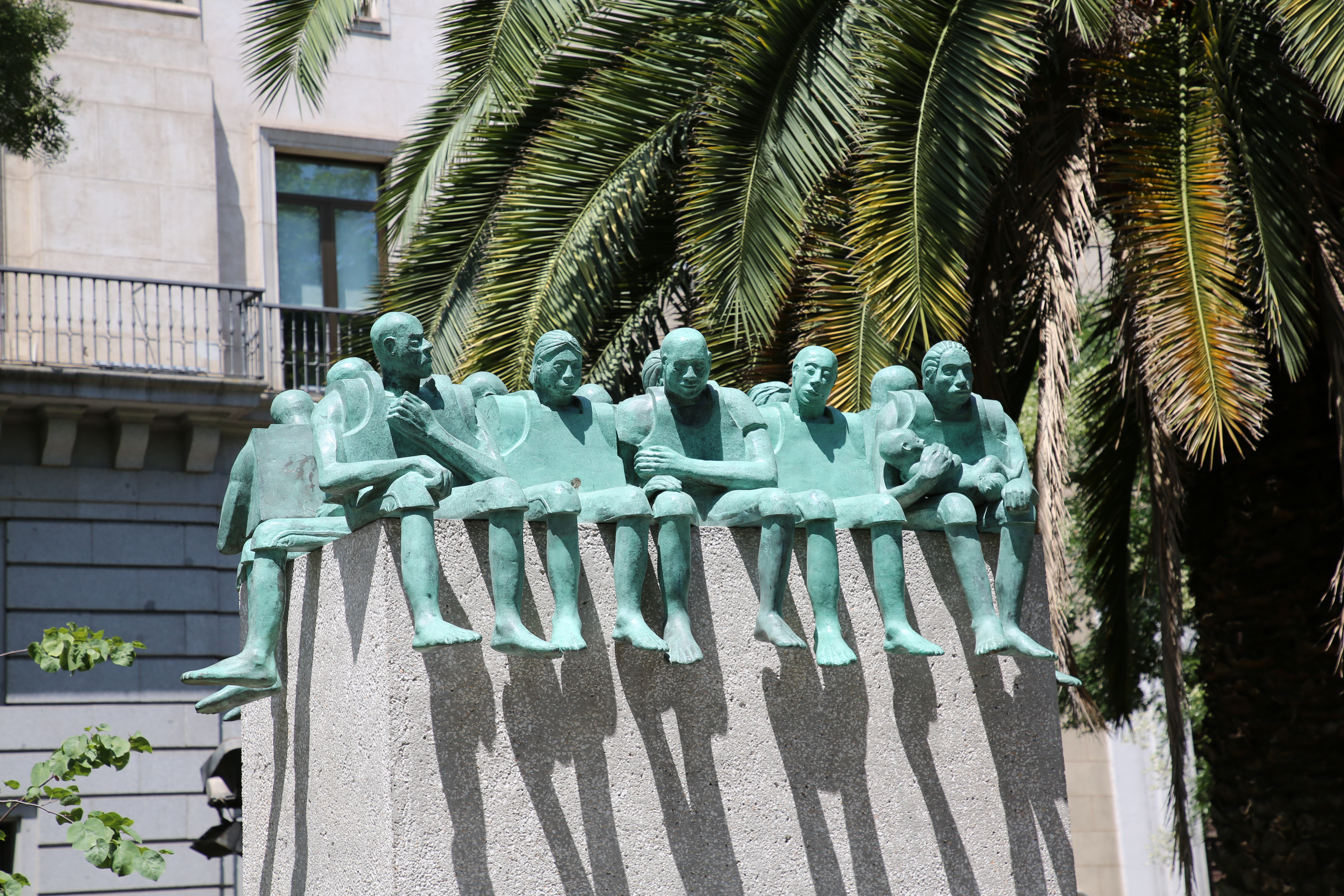
Refugees, sculpture by Bel Borba in Madrid, Spain.

Alberto José Costa Borba, known professionally as Bel Borba, is a Brazilian graphic artist, mosaic maker and sculptor, born in 1957. He lives in Salvador da Bahia, where he has intervened in the public arena of Brazil with hundreds of works, sculptures, mosaic murals and urban art installations, mostly employing found objects. He spent a month in New York City in the summer of 2012, where he constructed numerous outdoor pieces. A documentary film about his life and work, Bel Borba Aqui, was released in March 2012.
