= Francisco Gutiérrez Arribas =

Spanish sculptor (1727-1782)

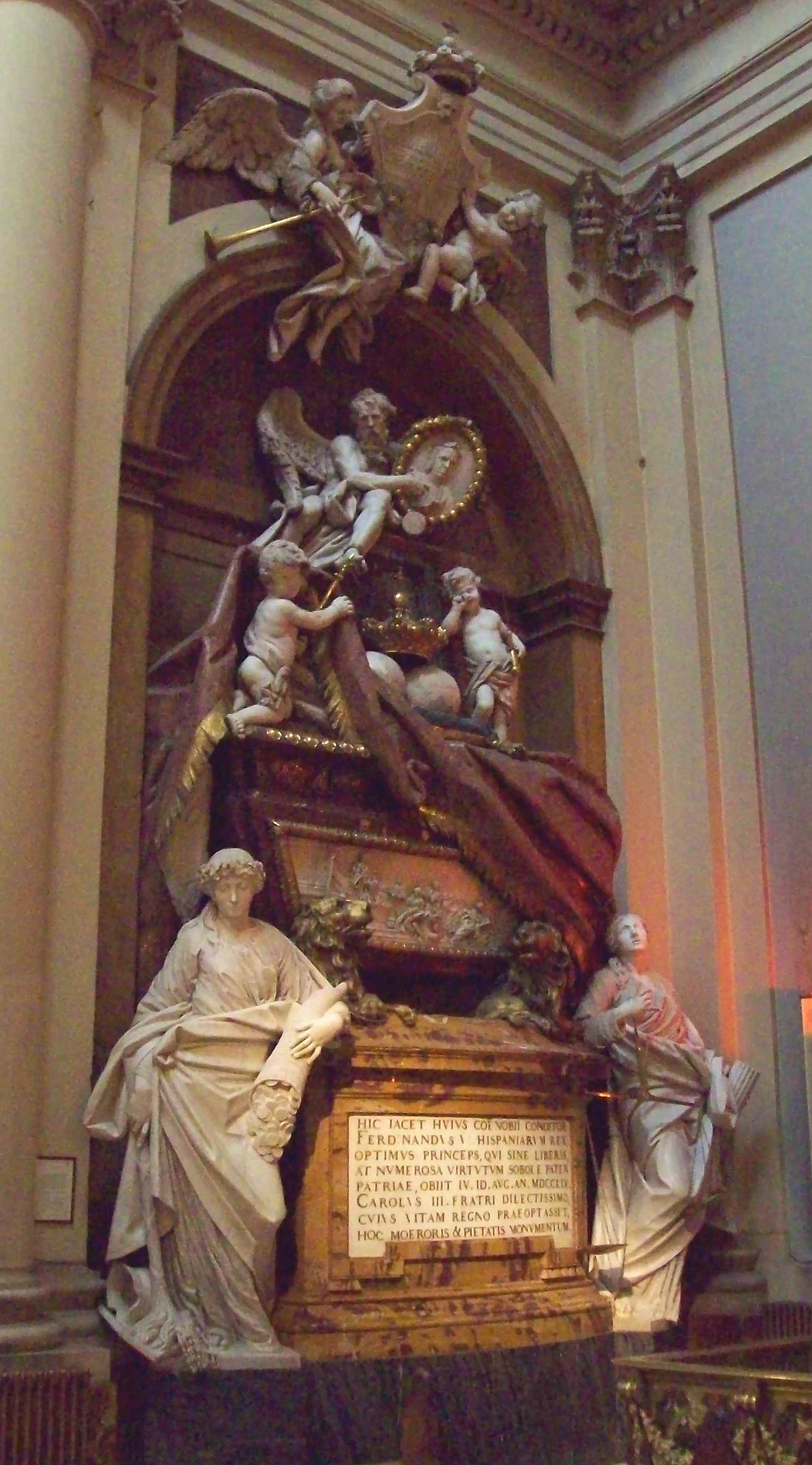
The Mausoleum of King Ferdinand VI of Spain, after a design by Francesco Sabatini

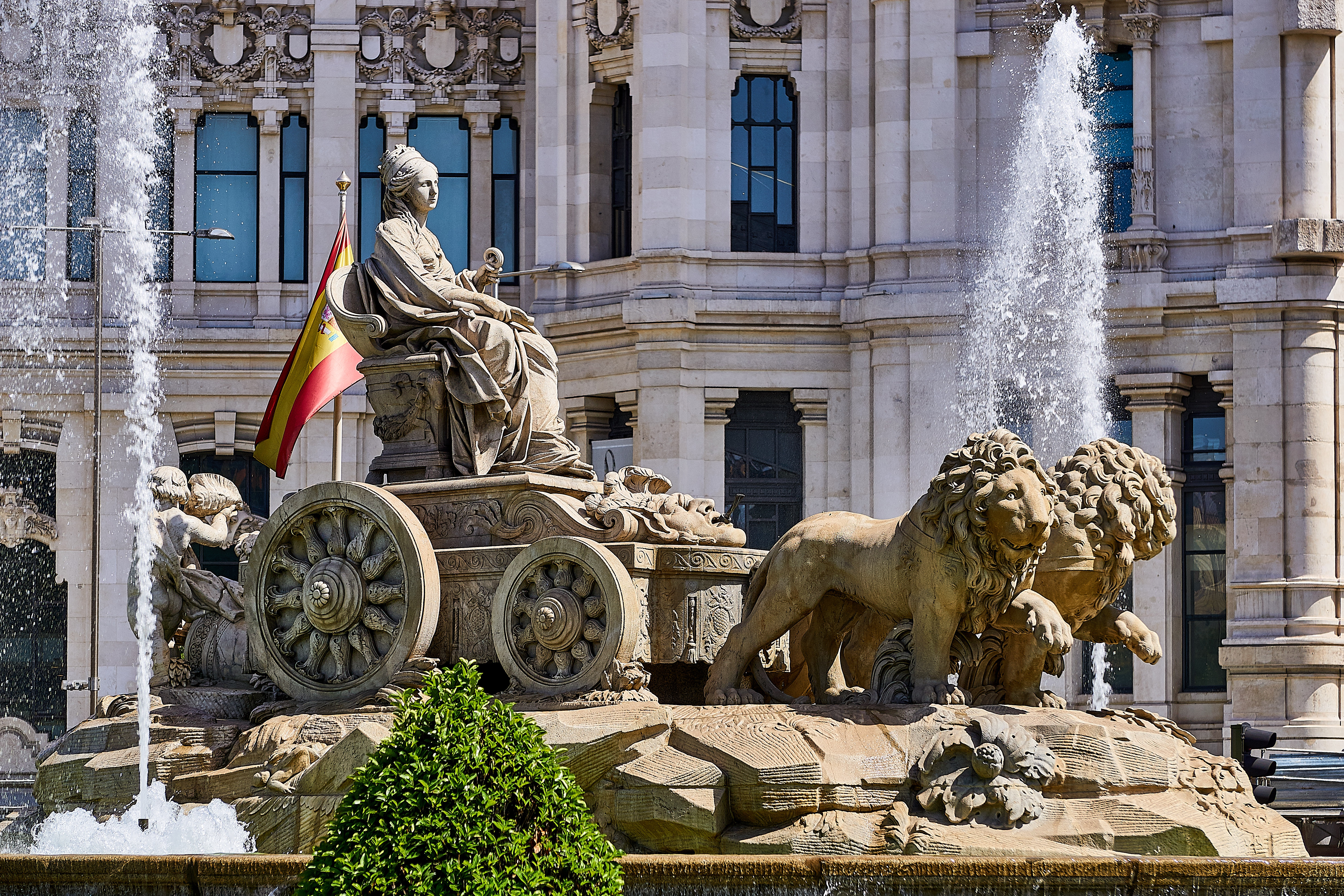
The Fountain of Cybele, Plaza de Cibeles, Madrid, Spain

Francisco Gutiérrez Arribas (1727, San Vicente de Arevalo - 1782, Madrid) was a Spanish sculptor.

== Life and works ==
His youthful works were all of a religious nature; primarily images of saints, but they were very derivative. In 1741, he moved to Madrid, and had the opportunity to improve his skills in the workshops of Luis Salvador Carmona. He developed his personal style by attending the Accademia di San Luca in Rome, where he was exposed to Classical art and monumental sculptures.

After returning to Madrid in 1761, he focused on creating secular works; notably a statue of Cybele for a fountain in the Plaza de Cibeles, numerous figures in the Puerta de San Vicente and Puerta de Alcalá and, in the last work, a shield bearing the coat-of-arms of the Borbons.

Among his other projects, he participated in creating the mortuary for King Ferdinand VI and provided allegorical figures depicting "Abundance", "Justice" and "Time" for the church of the Salesians, as well as some decorative putti.

He became a Professor at the Real Academia de Bellas Artes de San Fernando and a court sculptor. In 1765, he was named Director of the Academia when his mentor, Carmona, was forced to resign.

== Other selected works ==
- "Glory of the Angels" at the church of San Antonio de los Alemanes
- The sepulcher of Saint Peter of Alcántara in Arenas de San Pedro
- "Pietà" in Tarazona Cathedral
- "Saint Dominic and Saint Peter of Alcántara" in the Burgo de Osma Cathedral
