= Paseo de Recoletos =

Boulevard in central Madrid, Spain

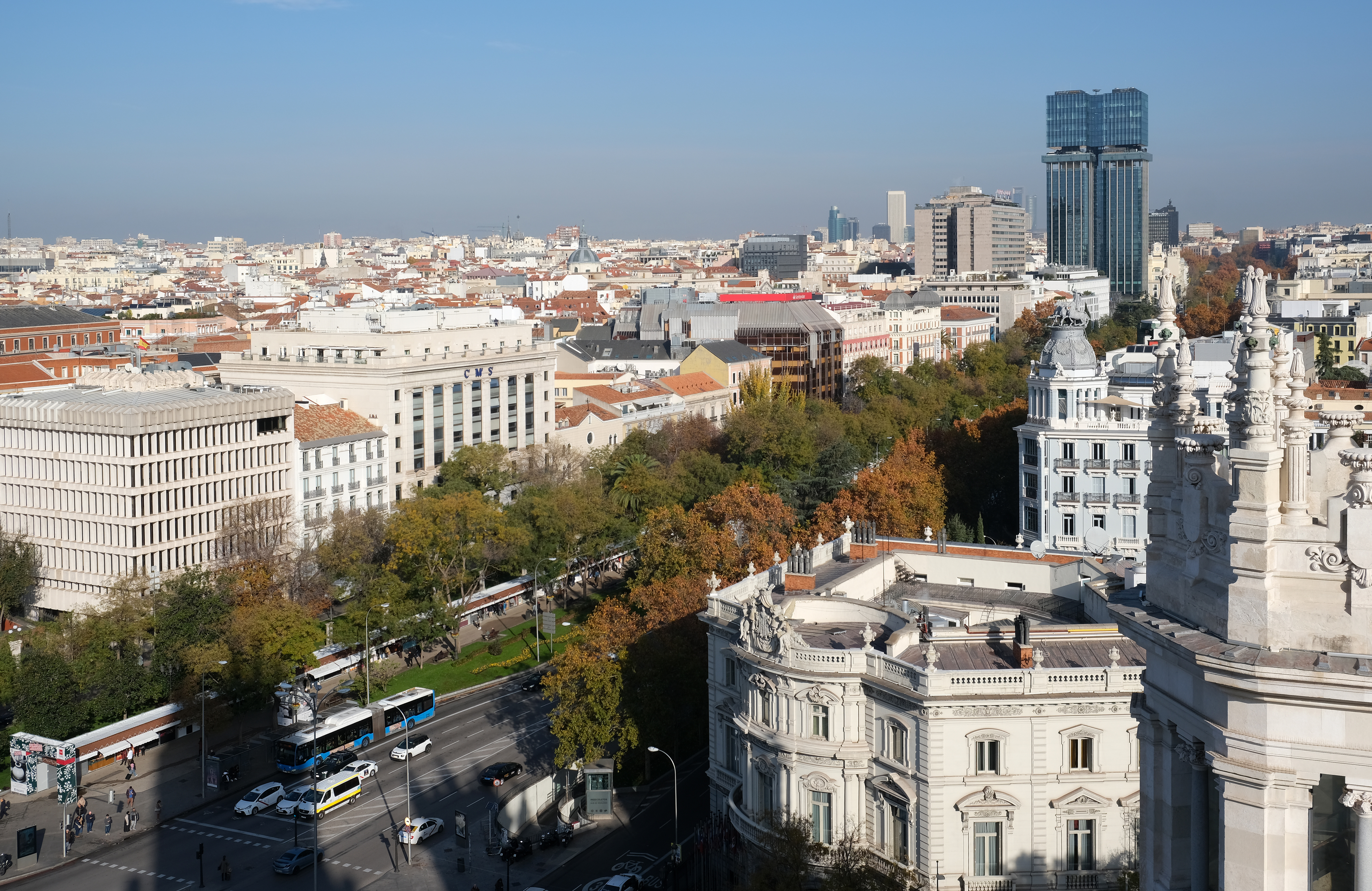
- Type: Boulevard
- Location: Madrid, Spain
- Coordinates: 40.4220°N 3.6918°W
- South end: Plaza de Cibeles
- North end: Plaza de Colón

Paseo de Recoletos is a wide boulevard in central Madrid leading from Plaza de Cibeles to Plaza de Colón.

From west to east it consists of:

- Two southward lanes
- The pedestrian walk
- A southward bus lane
- Three southward lanes
- Three northward lanes
- A median strip lined with trees, flowerbeds, etc.
- Two northward lanes
- A northward Bus lane.

== History ==
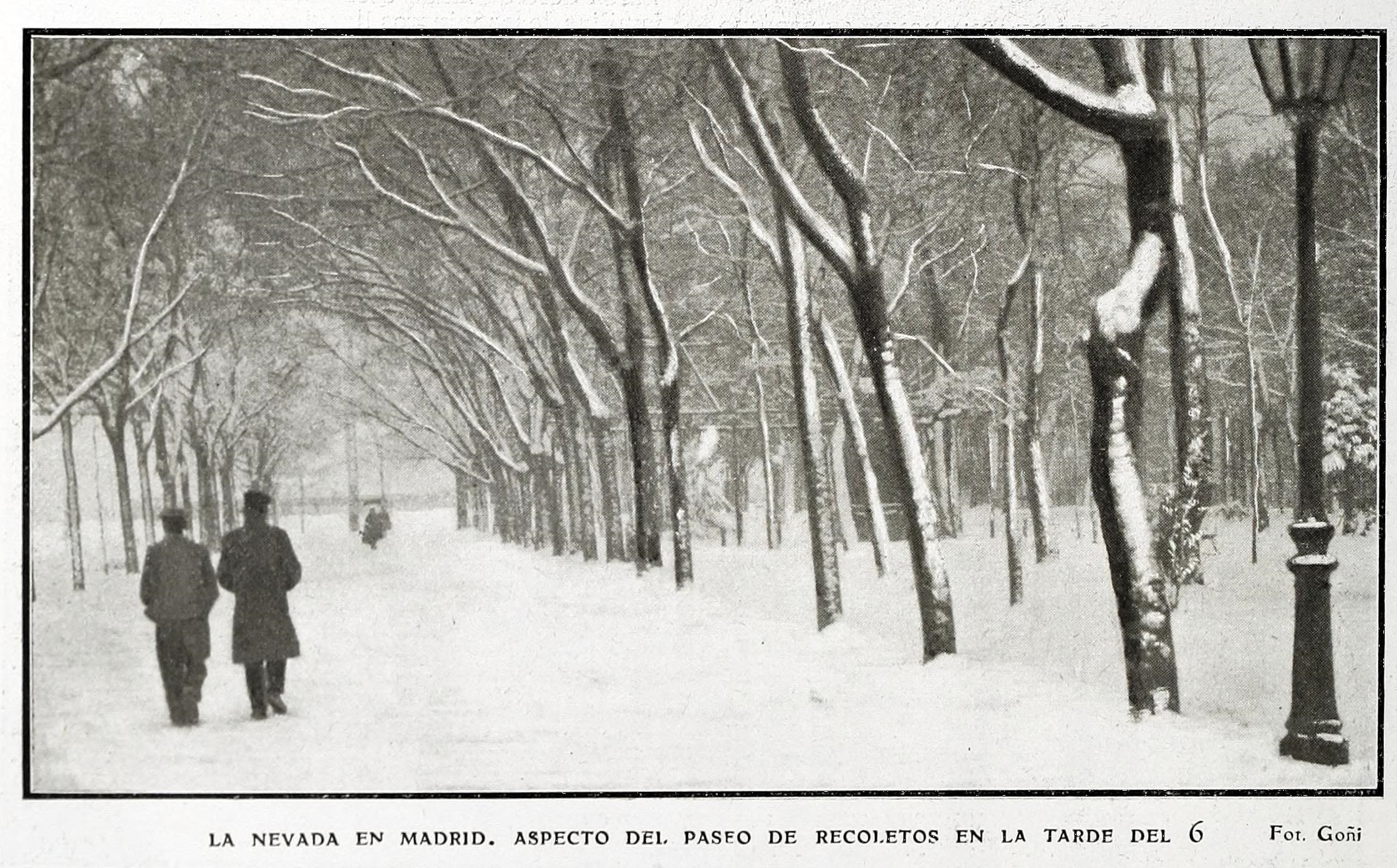
The after a snowfall in January 1907, by Goñi.

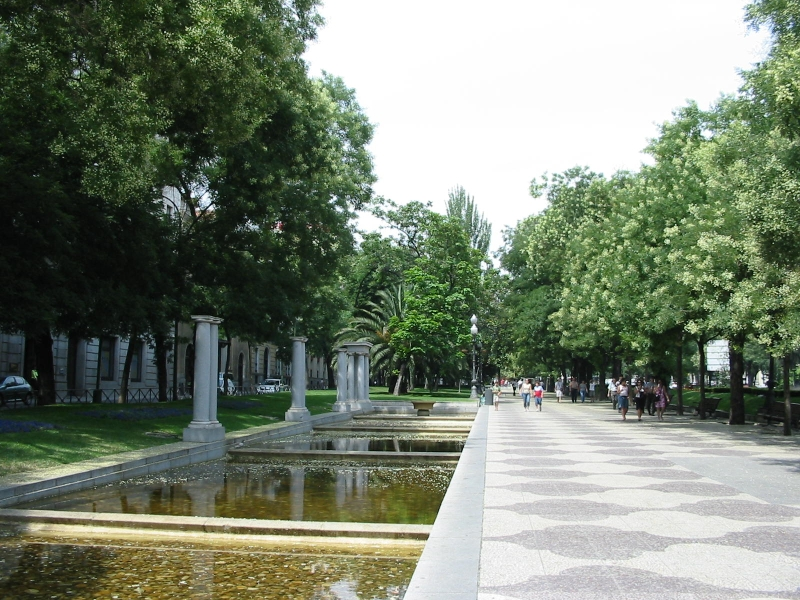
First stretch of the walk.

By the end of the 18th century architect José de Hermosilla was entrusted by King Charles III to urbanize the area of the old Bajo Abroñigal (or Valnegral) river, which flowed from Chamartín to Plaza Atocha. This gave birth to Paseo del Prado as well to Paseo de Recoletos. The name "Recoletos" was taken from an old convent of Augustinian Recollect friars built in 1592 in the area.

The boulevard originally ended in the old Puerta de Recoletos, a baroque gate built under Ferdinand VI in 1756 and dismantled in 1863. During the Peninsular War this gate (and others of the area) was fortified to fend off the Napoleonic troops. On 3 December 1808 Napoleon I personally directed the attacks against Madrid from the Fuente Castellana (today Plaza de Emilio Castelar). The Batería de Veterinaria (commanded by artillery official Vasallo) held off the troops that were trying to breach Recoletos Gate to surround the Alcalá Gate defenders. The French troops managed to break through El Retiro, outflanking the gates of Recoletos, Alcalá and Atocha, leading to Madrid's capitulation the following day.

During the Civil War the statues and fountains along the Paseo de Recoletos and El Prado were hidden under protection sacks, which led the area to be nicknamed "of the twilight of the gods".

== Pedestrian boulevard ==
The center part of the boulevard is a pedestrian walk, lined with gardens, trees, statues, fountains and varied street furniture.

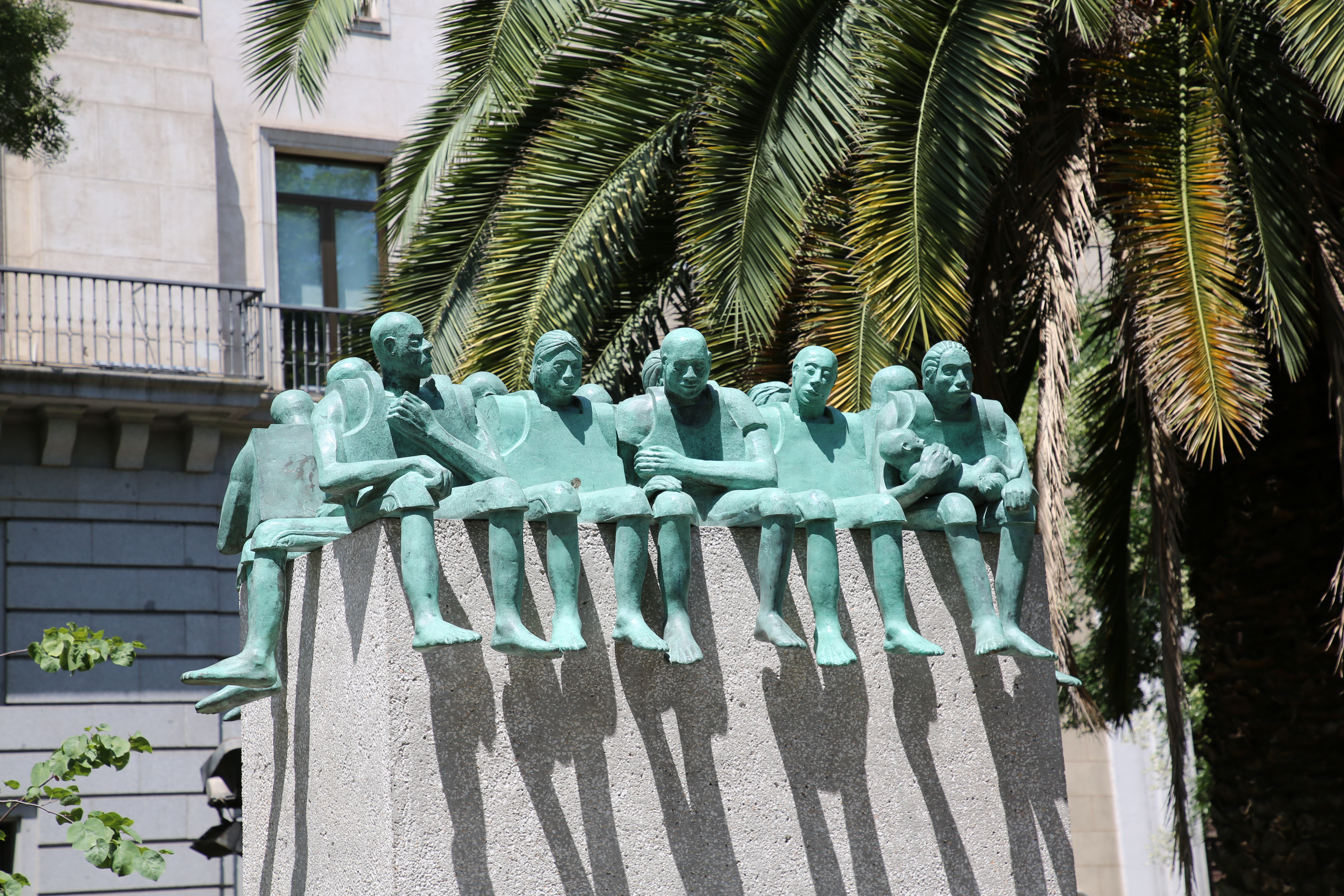
Monument to migrants and refugees located at one of the water ponds of the boulevard.

The first and largest stretch of the boulevard (from Plaza Cibeles to Calle de Prim) has a row of eight ponds lined with white double doric columns. The ponds, which are lighted at night, are situated one slightly above the next one, forming tiny water falls in between. The first and last of these ponds have little jet fountains.

The Terraza Recoletos (an outdoor café-restaurant) and an Equatorial Sundial are nearby.

The second and shortest stretch (from Calle Prim to Calle Almirante/Recoletos) contains the Café Gijón (number 21), an historic literary café founded in 1888 with an outdoor terraza on the boulevard.

On the fourth and last stretch (from Calle Bárbara de Braganza/Villanueva to Plaza de Colón) is the Café El Espejo (number 31), another quaint café with an impressive glass pavilion influenced by Art Nouveau. It also has a monument dedicated to Spanish author Juan Valera and one of his best known works, Pepita Jiménez, a statue of Ramón del Valle-Inclán and a drinking fountain. Near the northern corner of the stretch is the entrance to a pedestrian underground passage leading to the eastern median strip of the boulevard. This tunnel appears in Carlos Saura's film Taxi (1996).

== Eastern median strip ==
This strip is divided into four stretches, the same as the pedestrian walk. The northern stretch is not wide enough to allow a walk, but it contains a green area commemorative stone for the 30th Anniversary of the Children's Rights declaration, and a little iron sculpture of two reading kids "to the Book and its creators" (this sculpture is in front of the National Library).

The other three stretches are lined with trees, bushes and ornamental flowerbeds, and a path for pedestrians.

== Events on the Paseo ==
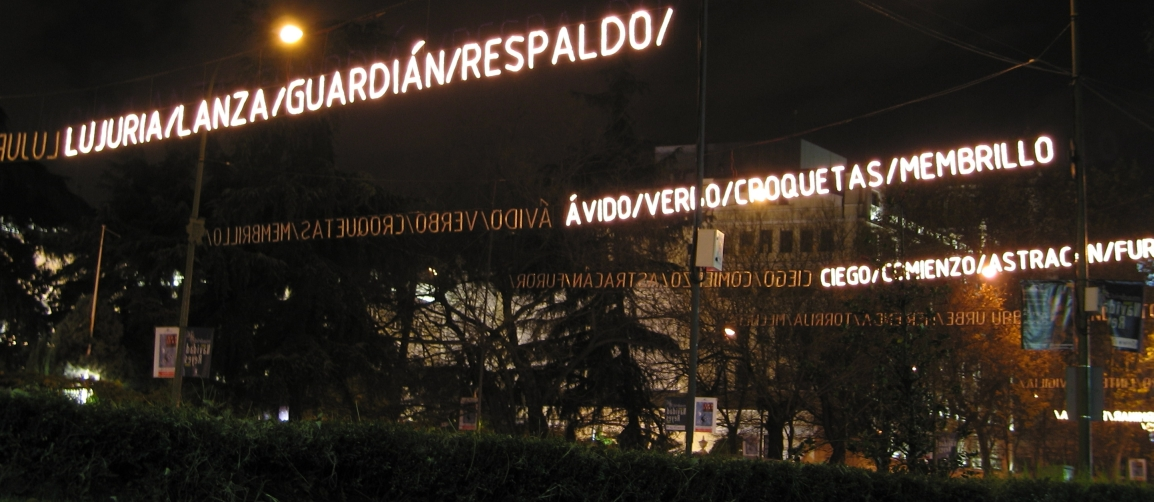
Christmas decorations by Eva Lootz, 2004

The pedestrian walk is lined with stands several times a year:

- The Feria del Libro Antiguo y de Ocasión (Secondhand Book Fair), held in April/May.
- The Feria de Artesanía (Craftmanship Fair), held during Christmas period.
- The Feria del Libro Viejo y Antiguo (Old Book Fair), held in Autumn.
- A Feria del Disco Antiguo y de Ocasión (Secondhand Gramophone record Fair) was held every Spring between 2000 and 2005 but the Town Hall denied permission in 2006.
- Every 27 March at midday the World Theatre Day is celebrated around the Valle-Inclán statue, with the "Alfiler de la Bufanda" prize-giving ceremony and the reading of a letter to Valle-Inclán and the World Theatre Day Manifesto.

Paseo de Recoletos is also used as an outdoors temporary exhibition place:

- From 4 May to 31 July 2006 the 10 pieces "ONE through ZERO" by Robert Indiana decorate it. This exhibition is completed with another five pieces in Paseo del Prado ("Love", "Amor", "Art", "Imperial Love", "Love Wall") by the same artist.
- From 12 May to 12 August 1994 21 sculptures by Fernando Botero were shown along the pedestrian walk.

Other events:

- During the "Madrid Abierto" street art events the Paseo hosted the Museo Peatonal, a collection of objects by people living or working in the area that sought to reflect the spirit of the place.
- In Christmas 2004 the Paseo was decorated with rows of illuminated words by artist Eva Lootz. They were light in slow waves and were situated in each traffic lane.

== Buildings along the East side of the Paseo (even numbers) ==
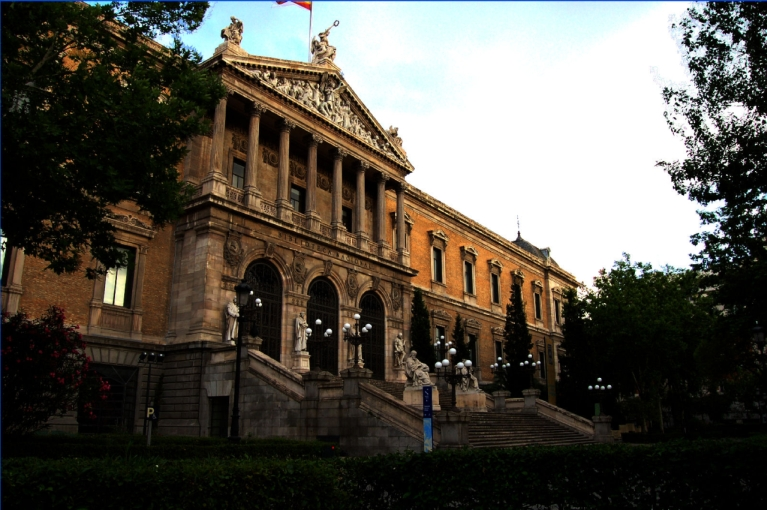
The National Library on Paseo de Recoletos.

The first building next to the Jardines del Descubrimiento is the Casa del Tesoro (numbers 20/22 of the boulevard), built around 1568 and occupied since 1711 by the Biblioteca Nacional (Recoletos side) and the National Archeological Museum (Serrano street side).

In number 10 lies the Marqués de Salamanca Palace, built between 1846 and 1855 by architect Narciso Pascual y Colomer in a Renaissance style. The Marquis sold it in 1876 to the Banco Hipotecario, which installed its headquarters in it and enlarged it in 1905, 1919 and 1945/1948 with two new pavilions and two lateral wings. In 1991 it was acquired by Banco Argentaria and it currently houses the BBVA Foundation.

Right next to the Plaza Cibeles (in Recoletos, 2) lies the Marqués de Linares Palace (Palacio de Linares), built in 1873 by architect Carlos Colubí. In that terrain had stood since the 17th century the Pósito de la Villa, a big cereal warehouse with reserves to be used in times of shortage.

During the 20th century it was sold to the Transmediterranean Company and later to the Spanish Confederation of Savings Banks. In 1976 it was declared "Historical-Artistic Monument", saving it from ruin and speculation. In 1989 it was sold by magnate Emiliano Revilla for 3,6 million Euro to the Instituto de Cooperación Hispanoamericana, the Town Hall and Madrid Autonomous Community to rehabilitate it (on a budget of more than 12 million Euro) and establish the Casa de América on it, where it currently resides.

== Buildings along the West side of the Paseo (odd numbers) ==
In Recoletos (number 3) and right in front of the Palacio de Linares lies a six-storey office building built in 1975 and renovated in 2000 bought in July 2006 by Grupo Ballester. Numbers 7 and 9 consist of a building owned by magnate Alicia Koplowitz that currently houses the British Consul General among others.

Next to it stands the Convent of San Pascual (or San Pascual Bailón), founded in 1683 by the Admiral of Castile, Juan Gaspar Enríquez de Cabrera for the Franciscan order of San Pedro de Alcántara.

In 1836 during the Desamortización of Mendizábal the convent was transformed into a wood warehouse, until 1852, when the Franciscan nuns came back under the protection of Mariano Téllez Girón Beaufort, duke of Osuna and Medina de Rioseco.

Every Tuesday -19'00 h- is celebrated a service in the old Spanish liturgy (Gothic-Hispanic or Mozarabic Rite).

Nine years later it was expropriated by the Town Hall and demolished to enlarge the Paseo. In 1866 the current building was built by architect Juan J. Urquijo, and is inhabited by the nuns.

Number 13 is occupied by the Palace of Alcañices or Duque de Sesto. It was built in 1865 by architect Francisco de Cubas, a typical palatial residence of the high class of 19th century Isabelian Madrid. Seven years later the same architect built the next building (number 15), known as the Palace of López Dóriga, in the same style. And the block ends with the Houses of the Asociación Mutua Benéfica, built in 1869 also following the Isabelino style. It currently belongs to the Ministry of the Navy.

A modern crystal building stands out in number 19; it's Banco Pastor's headquarters, built by Corrales and Molezún (1973/1975).

The Palace of Duchess of Mediana de las Torres stands in number 23, built on the terrain where it once was the Circo de Price (burned down in 1876, four years before). The two towers at both sides of the building were added in 1910. The Palace of Elduayen (one of the last ones of this period) was built next to it (number 25) and currently belongs to the Mapfre Insurance Company.

== Sources and references ==
- Madrid Histórico (in Spanish)
- Mad about Madrid (in English)
- QDQ Foto Guide (in Spanish)
- Paseo de Recoletos in Google Maps
- Taxi at IMDb
- Pictures and info about the Paseo
