= Refugiados (monument) =

Monument in Madrid

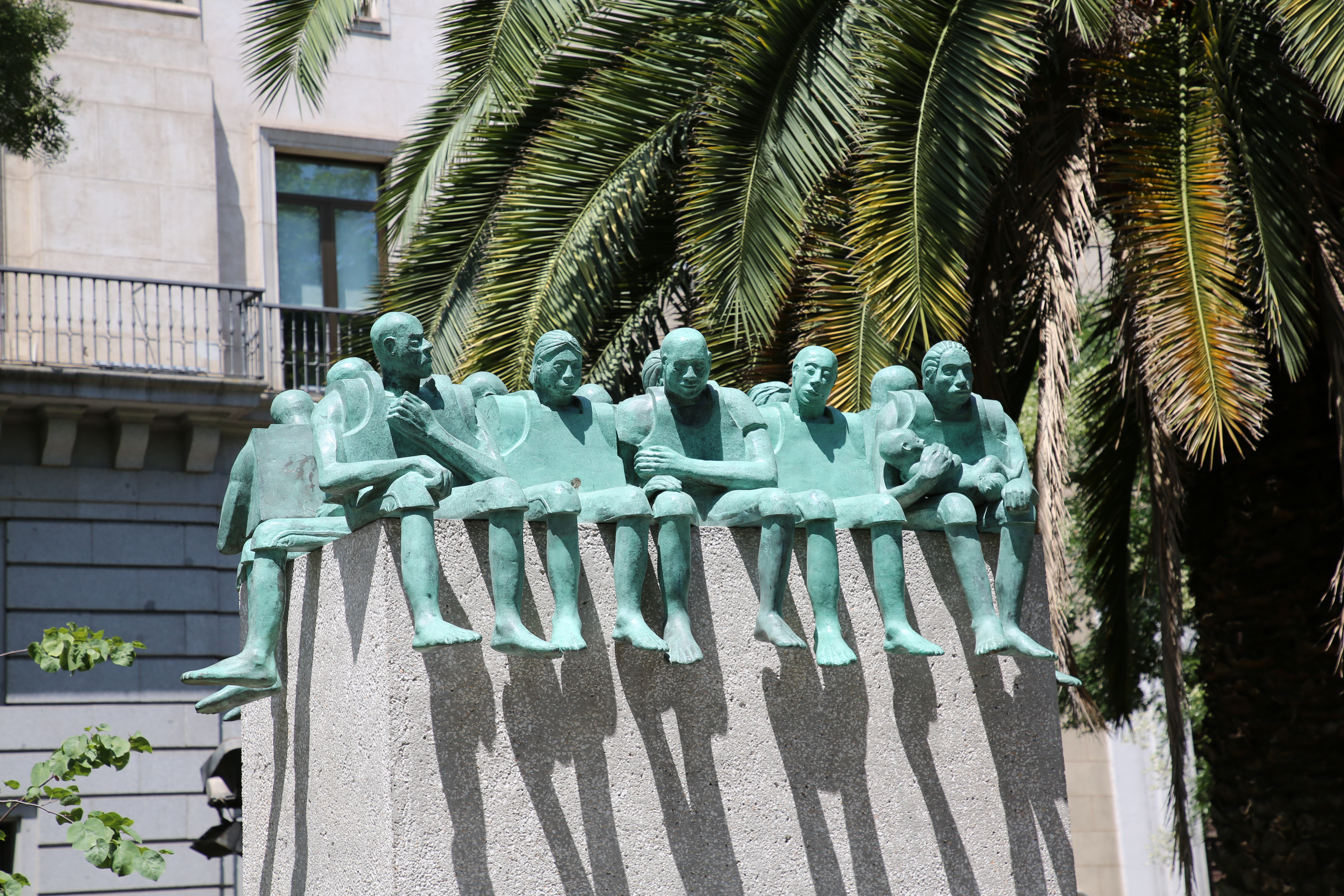
- 40.420453°N 3.692863°W
- Location: Paseo de Recoletos, Madrid, Spain
- Designer: Bel Borba
- Material: Bronze, concrete
- Weight: 960 kg (sculptural group)
- Opening date: 2019
- Dedicated to: Refugees and migrants

Refugiados ("Refugees") is a monument and instance of public art in Madrid, Spain. Located at a water pond of the Paseo de Recoletos, it is dedicated to migrants and refugees.

== History and description ==
The idea for the erection of a monument to immigrants and refugees was passed by the government board presided by Manuela Carmena in 2018. According to municipal government spokesperson Rita Maestre, it was a way to convey the recognition that refugees and immigrants "have built the city of Madrid".

Designed by Brazilian artist Bel Borba, the project was an adaptation of the author's work Homage to Migrants (presented to the Biennale de Montreux exposition at Lake Geneva), repurposed to fit a location at one of the water ponds of the Paseo de Recoletos, featuring a 180 x 100 x 180 cm concrete block with veins of granite, over which the bronze ensemble would stand. The 960 kg bronze sculptural ensemble consists of 16 seated figures, male and female alike—some of them carrying babies—wearing life vests while waiting for assistance.

The works for the installment of the monument started on 13 May 2019.
