= Navamorcuende =

- municipality
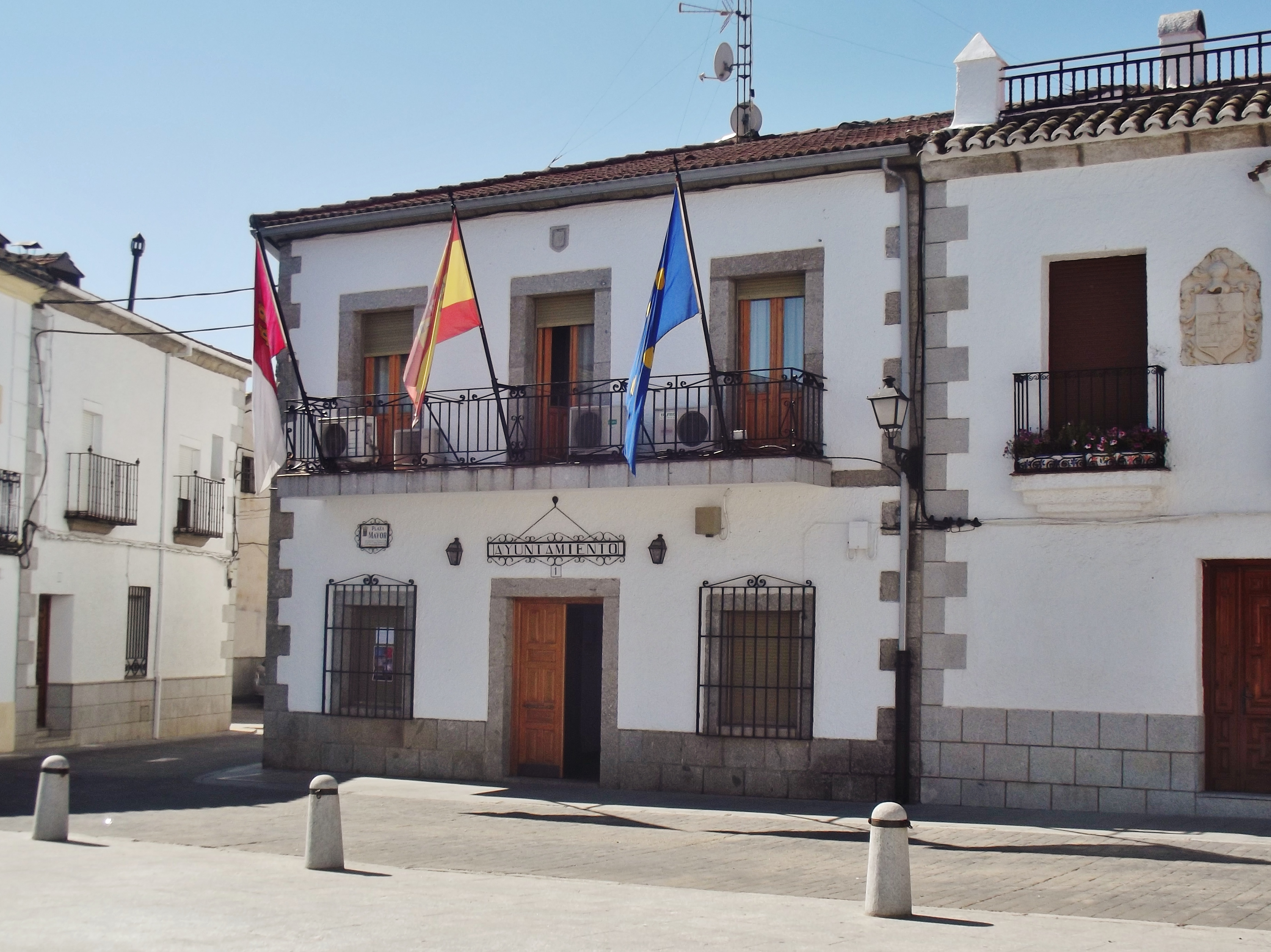
- Town hall

- Coat of arms

- Location in Spain
- Coordinates: 40°9′17″N 4°47′23″W
- Country: Spain
- Autonomous community: Castile-La Mancha
- Province: Toledo
- Comarca: Sierra de San Vicente

Government
  - Mayor: Victoriano Blázquez Muñoz

Area
  - Total: 17 km^{2} (6.6 sq mi)
- Elevation: 675 m (2,215 ft)

Population (2025-01-01)
  - Total: 581
  - Density: 34/km^{2} (89/sq mi)
- Demonym: Navamorcondinos
- Time zone: UTC+1 (CET)
  - Summer (DST): UTC+2 (CEST)

Navamorcuende was a municipality located in the province of Toledo, Castile-La Mancha, Spain.
