= Plaza de Cibeles =

Square in Madrid, Spain

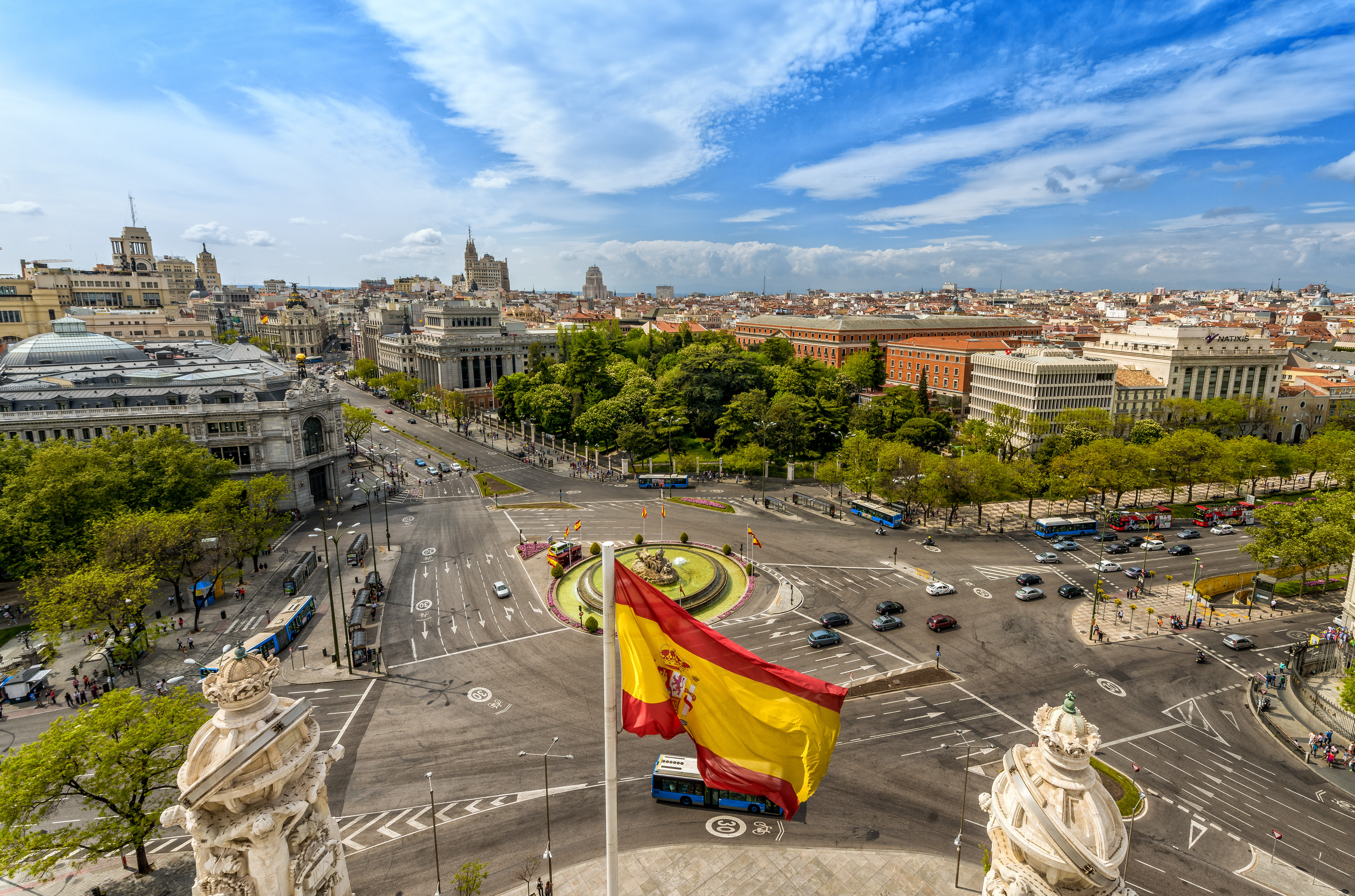
- Type: Plaza, traffic circle
- Maintained by: City Council of Madrid
- Location: Madrid, Spain
- Coordinates: 40.419335°N 3.693088°W

The Plaza de Cibeles is a square with a neo-classical complex of marble sculptures with fountains that has become a symbol for the city of Madrid. It sits at the intersection of Calle de Alcalá (running from east to west), Paseo de Recoletos (to the North) and Paseo del Prado (to the south). Plaza de Cibeles was originally named Plaza de Madrid, but in 1900, the City Council named it Plaza de Castelar, which was eventually replaced by its current name.

It is currently delimited by four prominent buildings: the Bank of Spain Building, the Palacio de Buenavista, the Palace of Linares ("Palacio de Linares"), and the Cybele Palace ("Palacio de Cibeles"). These constructions are located in four different neighbourhoods from three different adjacent districts: Centro, Retiro, and Salamanca.

Over the years, Cybele Palace and her fountain have become symbolic monuments of the city.

== Cibeles Fountain ==
The fountain of Cybele is found in the part of Madrid commonly called the Paseo de Recoletos. This fountain is named after Cybele, a Phrygian goddess. The fountain is traditionally the place where Real Madrid C.F. celebrate their team victories, with the team captain placing a Real Madrid flag and scarf on the statue.

== Cybele Palace ==
The most prominent of the buildings at the Plaza de Cibeles is the Cybele Palace (formerly named Palace of Communication), which is the seat of the Madrid City Council.

== Gallery ==
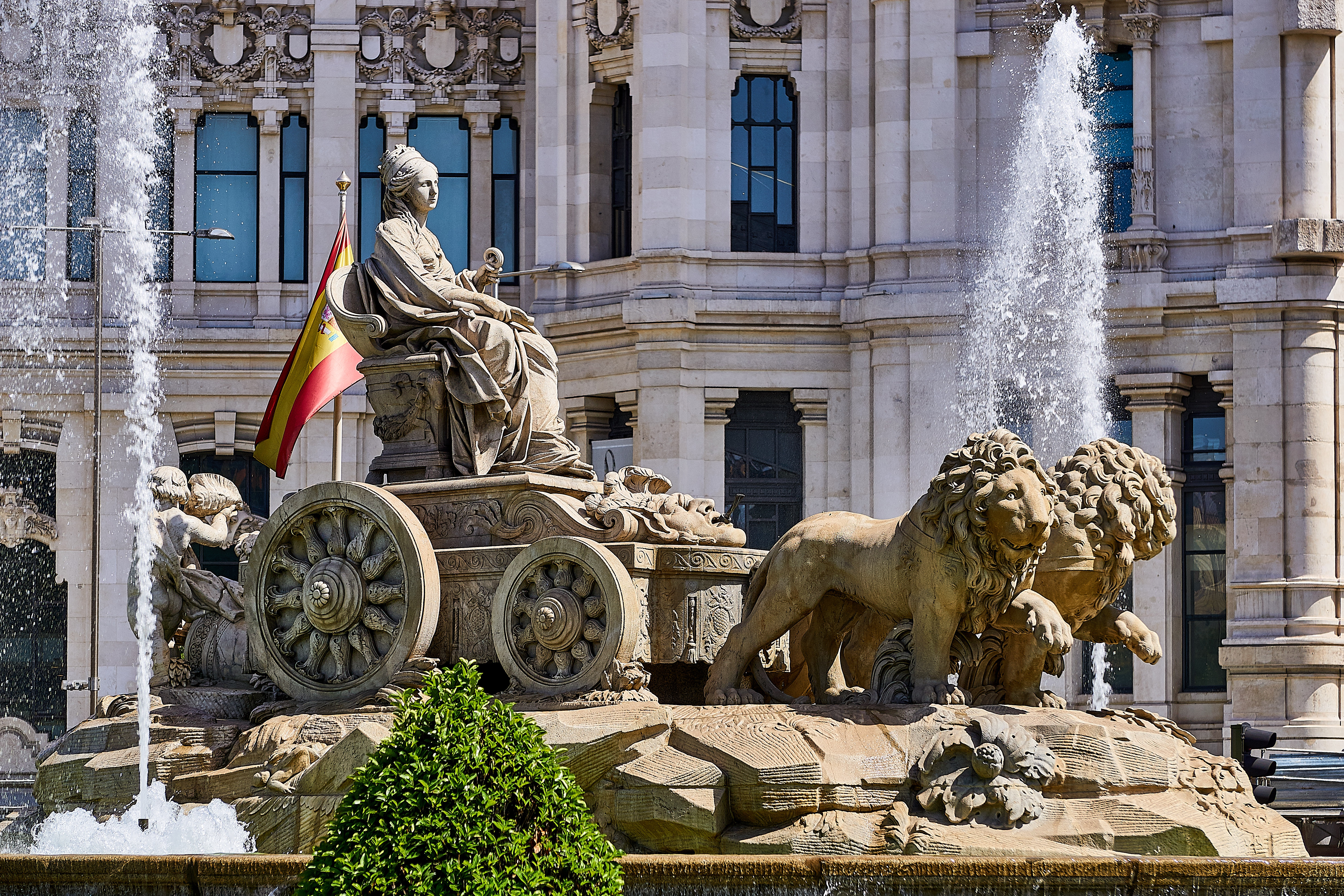
Statue of Cybele by Francisco Gutiérrez Arribas

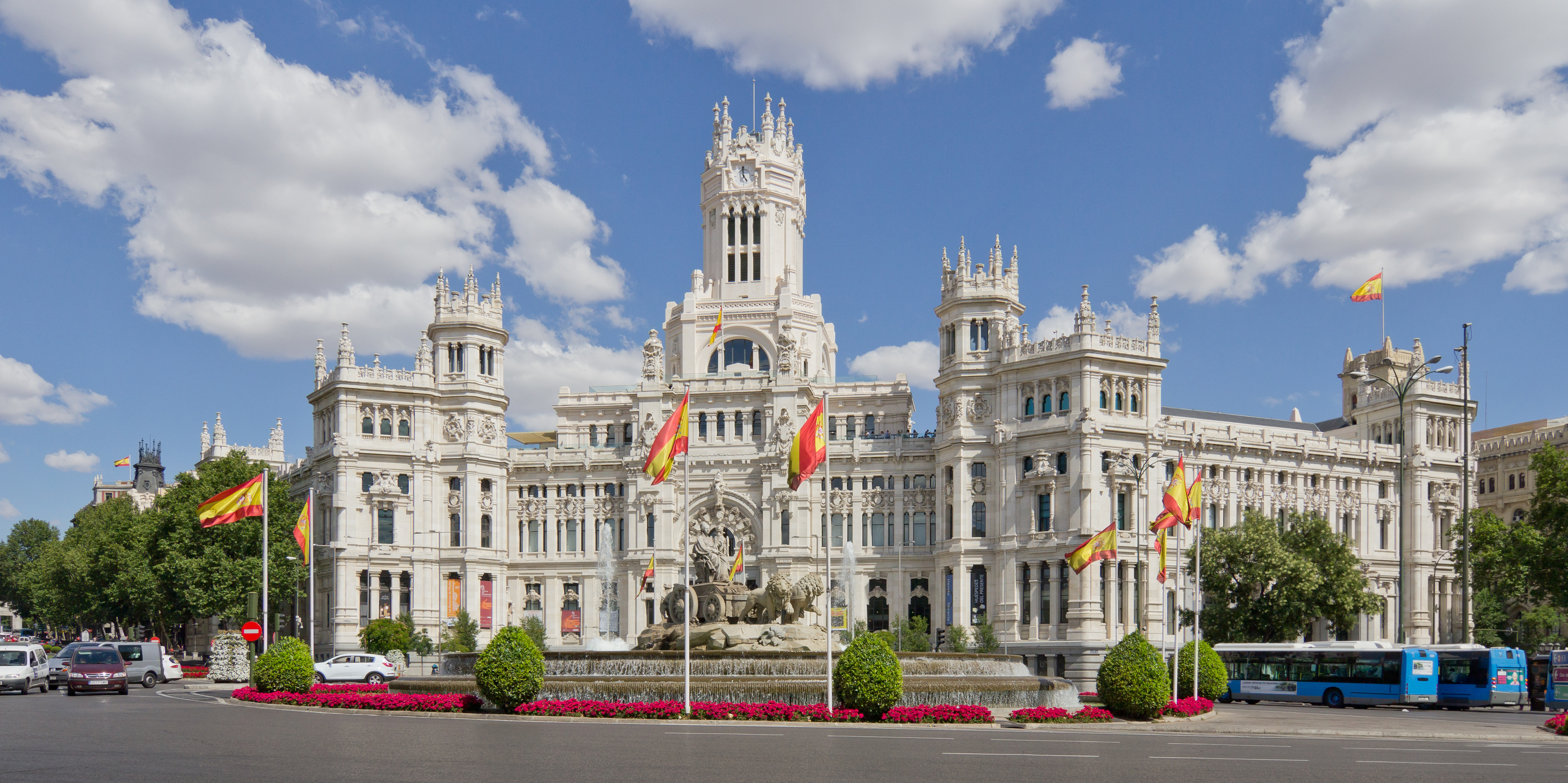
Cybele Palace (formerly Palace of Communications)

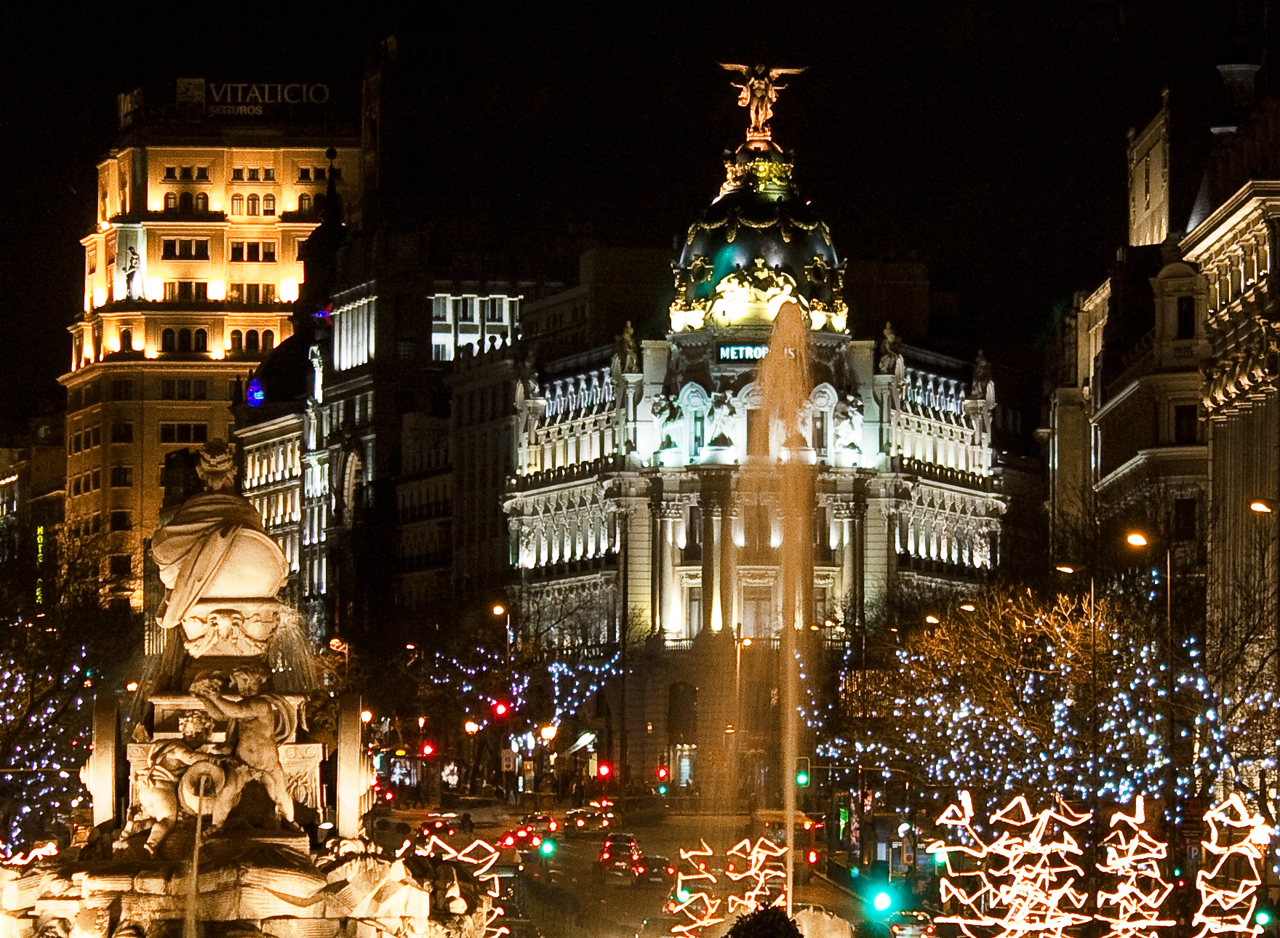
Night view of the Plaza, with the
Metropolis Building

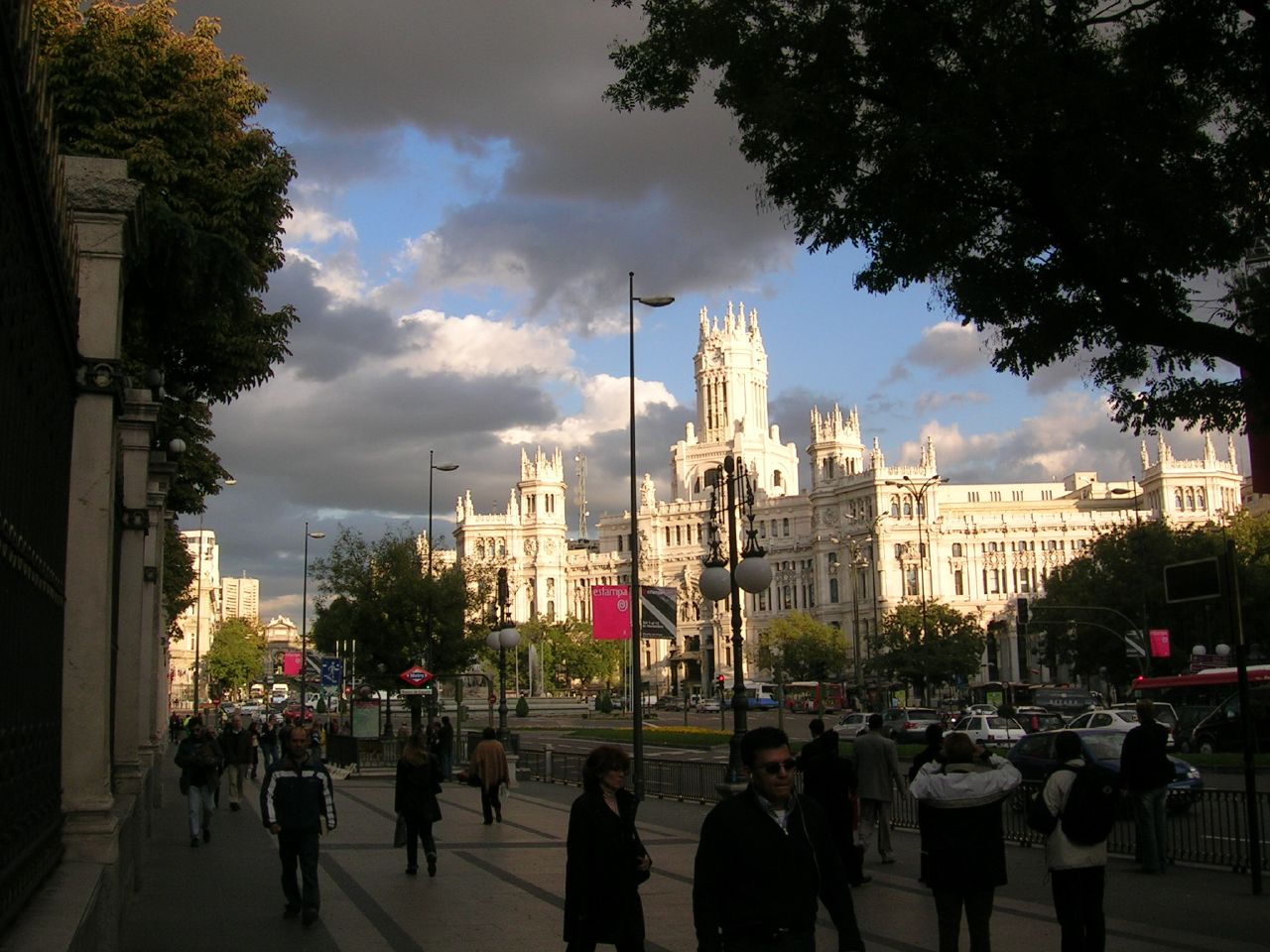
View from the Calle de Alcalá
