= Velada =

- Municipality
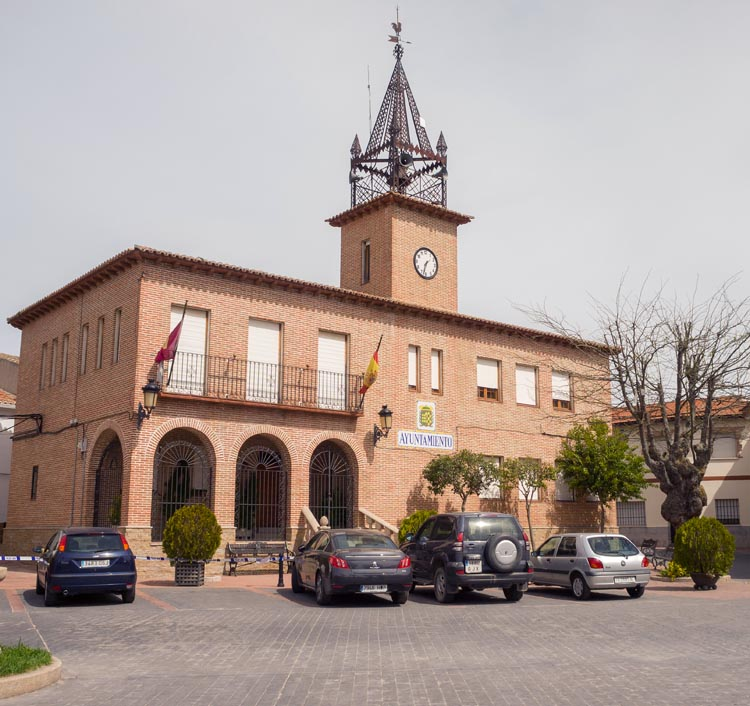
- Town hall

- Flag Coat of arms

- Location in Spain
- Coordinates: 39°59′N 4°59′W
- Country: Spain
- Autonomous community: Castile-La Mancha
- Province: Toledo
- Municipality: Velada

Area
  - Total: 145 km^{2} (56 sq mi)
- Elevation: 432 m (1,417 ft)

Population (2025-01-01)
  - Total: 2,899
  - Density: 20.0/km^{2} (51.8/sq mi)
- Time zone: UTC+1 (CET)
  - Summer (DST): UTC+2 (CEST)

Velada is a municipality located in the province of Toledo, Castile-La Mancha, Spain. According to the 2006 census (INE), the municipality has a population of 2,436 inhabitants.

== Name ==
Velada comes from "velar" ('to stay awake at night'/'to be vigilant', from Latin 'vigilare'). Prior to Velada, the place was known as Las Atalayuelas de Guadierva.

== History ==
Segregated from the land of Ávila, the Crown awarded the place in 1271 to knights from the former city, tasked with the repopulation of the area. Known as Las Atalayuelas de Guadierva, the place was ensuingly renamed as Velada on royal initiative.

Velada was possibly granted the privilege of township towards 1588.

== Watermelon of Velada ==
The velada watermelon is one of the main engines of the economy of this municipality. Being a dry and ecological crop, these watermelons have great flavor and the largest can reach up to 30 kg in weight. They grow in a large area called "El Baldío" and their collection usually goes from mid-July to mid-October, and even depending on the year, until November. The planting takes place between April and May.

Velada's watermelon is exported in Spain and abroad.
