= List of wars involving the Lusitanians =

This is a list of wars and conflicts involving the Lusitanians.

Lusitanian victory
Lusitanian defeat
Another result

Conflict	Location	Combatant 1	Combatant 2	Result	Leader
Battle of Ilipa (194 BC)	Near Ilipa	Lusitanians	Roman Republic	Defeat	Unknown
Battle of Lyco (190 BC)	Lyco	Lusitanians	Roman Republic	Victory	Unknown
Unnamed battle (190 BC)	Hispania	Lusitanians	Roman Republic	Defeat	Unknown
First capture of Hasta (190 BC)	Hasta	Lusitanians	Roman Republic	Defeat	Unknown
Second capture of Hasta (186 BC)	Hasta	Lusitanians	Roman Republic	Defeat	Unknown
Clashes near Toletum (185 BC)	Near Toledo	Lusitanians; Celtiberians; Vaccaei	Roman Republic	Victory	Unknown
Battle of the Tagus River (185 BC)	Tagus River	Lusitanians	Roman Republic	Defeat	Unknown
Incursions along the Tagus River (180 BC)	Along the Tagus River	Lusitanians	Roman Republic	Defeat	Unknown
Lusitanian rebellion (163–162 BC)	Hispania	Lusitanians	Roman Republic	Defeat	Unknown
Lusitanian War (155–139 BC)	Hispania	Lusitanians and others…	Roman Republic and others…	Defeat: Pacification of Lusitania	Viriathus X Tautalus (surrendered); Curius †; Apuleius; Punicus †; Caesarus
Punicus's attacks (155 BC): Part of the Lusitanian War	Hispania	Lusitanians	Roman Republic	Victory	Punicus
Siege of the Blastophoenicians (155 BC): Part of the Lusitanian War	Hispania	Lusitanians; Vettones	Roman Republic; Blastophoenicians	Victory	Punicus †
Battle of the Tagus (153 BC): Part of the Lusitanian War	Tagus River	Lusitanians	Roman Republic	Victory	Caesarus
Conquest of Conistorgis (153 BC): Part of the Lusitanian War	Conistorgis	Lusitanians	Roman Republic; Cunei	Victory	Caucenus
Siege of Ocile (153 BC): Part of the Lusitanian War	Conistorgis	Lusitanians	Roman Republic	Defeat	Unknown
Conquest of Oxthracae (152 BC): Part of the Lusitanian War	Conistorgis	Lusitanians	Roman Republic	Defeat	Unknown
Unnamed battle (152 BC): Part of the Lusitanian War	Hispania	Lusitanians	Roman Republic	Victory	Unknown
Lucullus's invasion of Lusitania (151 BC): Part of the Lusitanian War	Lusitania	Lusitanians	Roman Republic	Defeat	Unknown
Lusitanian Massacre (150 BC): Part of the Lusitanian War	Lusitania	Lusitanians	Roman Republic	Defeat	Unknown
Attack on Turdetania (148 BC): Part of the Lusitanian War	Turdetania	Lusitanians	Roman Republic	Defeat	Unknown
Battle of Tribola (147 BC): Part of the Lusitanian War	Tribola	Lusitanians	Roman Republic	Victory	Viriathus
Belli–Titthi Massacre (147 BC): Part of the Lusitanian War	Near Carpessus	Lusitanians	Belli; Titthi	Victory	Viriathus
Raid of Carpetania (146 BC): Part of the Lusitanian War	Carpetania	Lusitanians	Roman Republic	Victory	Viriathus
Aemilianus's attack against Viriathus (144 BC): Part of the Lusitanian War	Turdetania	Lusitanians	Roman Republic	Defeat: Fabius Aemilianus captures two cities	Viriathus
Battle of Mount Venus (143 BC): Part of the Lusitanian War	Mount Venus	Lusitanians	Roman Republic	Victory	Viriathus
Attack on the Bastetani (143 BC): Part of the Lusitanian War	Bastetani land	Lusitanians	Bastetani	Victory: Bastetani ravaged	Viriathus
Servilianus's campaign (142 BC): Part of the Lusitanian War	Hispania	Lusitanians	Roman Republic	Victory: Servilianus forced to flee to Itucca	Viriathus
Curius and Apuleius's attack on the Romans (142 BC): Part of the Lusitanian War	Hispania	Lusitanians	Roman Republic	Victory	Curius †; Apuleius
Attack on Erisana (142 BC): Part of the Lusitanian War	Erisana	Lusitanians	Roman Republic	Victory: Temporary peace treaty; Temporary end of the Lusitanian War	Viriathus
Assassination of Viriathus: Part of the Lusitanian War	Hispania	Lusitanians	Assassins	Viriathus is assassinated	Viriathus X
Tautalus's expedition against Saguntum (139 BC): Part of the Lusitanian War	Saguntum	Lusitanians	Roman Republic	Defeat: Surrender of Tautalus; End of the Lusitanian War	Tautalus (surrendered)
Sertorian War (80–72 BC)	Hispania	Sertorians; Iberian peoples Celtiberians; Cilician Pirates	Roman Republic; Sullan senate	Defeat	Quintus Sertorius X Lucius Hirtuleius †; M. Perperna Veiento (executed)
Lusitanian rebellion (114–112 BC)	Hispania	Lusitanians	Roman Republic	Defeat	Unknown
Caesar's campaign against Lusitania (61 BC)	Hispania	Lusitanians	Roman Republic	Defeat: Submission of all Lusitania	Unknown
