= Timeline of Portuguese history (Lusitania and Gallaecia) =

This is a historical timeline of Portugal.

== Roman Lusitania and Gallaecia ==
=== 3rd century BC ===
- 237 BC - The Carthaginian General Hamilcar Barca enters Iberia with his armies through Gadir.
- 228 BC - Hamilcar Barca dies in battle. He is succeeded in command of the Carthaginian armies in Iberia by his son-in-law Hasdrubal, who extends the newly acquired empire by skillful diplomacy, and consolidates it by the foundation of Carthago Nova (Cartagena) as the capital of the new province.
- 226 BC - Treaty of the Ebro between Carthage and Rome, by which Carthage grants the Greek colonies in eastern Iberia all the lands north of the Ebro river.
- 221 BC - Hasdrubal is killed by a Celtic assassin. Hannibal Barca, Hamilcar Barca's older son, is acclaimed commander-in-chief by the army and confirmed in his appointment by the Carthaginian Senate.
- 221 BC-219 BC - Hannibal Barca expands Carthaginian conquests in Iberia. He goes as far as to penetrate in the territory of the Vacceos (north of central Iberia) and captures the cities of Salmantica (Salamanca) and Arbucela (region of Zamora). He is also credited as having founded the Port of Hannibal (possibly Portimão in the Algarve).
- 219 BC - Hannibal Barca attacks the city of Saguntum (eastern Iberia). The Roman Senate sends envoys to declare the city under Roman protection, which is disregarded by Hannibal.

Carthaginian conquests in Iberia

- 218 BC
  - Hannibal Barca takes Saguntum and departs for the Italian Peninsula in order to attack the Romans in their own territory. His younger brother Hasdrubal Barca is left in the command of the Carthaginian armies in Iberia.
  - Rome sends its armies to Iberia led by Gnaeus Cornelius Scipio Calvus. Beginning of the Second Punic War between Carthage and Rome.
- 217 BC - Publius Cornelius Scipio joins his brother Gnaeus Cornelius Scipio Calvus in the war against Carthage in Iberia.
- 215 BC-213 BC - The Romans retake Saguntum and go deeper into Iberia, winning victories against the Carthaginians.
- 212 BC - Large Carthaginian counter-offensive led by Hasdrubal Barca, his brother Mago Barca and Gisgo.
- 211 BC
  - Publius Cornelius Scipio is killed in the Battle of Upper Baetis. Carthaginian victory.
  - Gnaeus Cornelius Scipio Calvus is killed in the Battle of Ilorci near Carthago Nova. Carthaginian victory.
- 210 BC
  - The Carthaginian armies spend the winter in an area populated by the Conii.
  - Hasdrubal son of Gisco goes into Lusitania and camps near the Tagus mouth.
  - Publius Cornelius Scipio Africanus Major arrives in Iberia and takes Carthago Nova.
- 209 BC - Scipio Africanus drives back Hasdrubal Barca from his position at Baecula, on the upper Guadalquivir, but is unable to hinder the Carthaginian's march to Italy.
- 206 BC
  - Battle of Ilipa (near Seville) between Roman legions, commanded by Scipio Africanus, and Carthaginian armies, commanded by Hasdrubal Gisco and Mago Barca. Roman victory that results in the evacuation of Iberia by the Punic commanders.
  - Gadir surrenders without a fight to the Romans.
- 202 BC - End of the Second Punic War with the defeat of Hannibal Barca in the Battle of Zama in North Africa.
- 200 BC - The Latin poet Quintus Ennius records, for the first time, the use of the word Hispania to designate the Iberian Peninsula (from the Carthaginian name). By this time, the Romans control most of eastern and southern Hispania, along the Mediterranean coast.

1st division of Roman Hispania

=== 2nd century BC ===
- 197 BC- The Romans created the Roman provinces of Hispania Citerior (nearer Spain, on the east coast) and Hispania Ulterior (further Spain, in the south). The praetors Gaius Sempronius Tuditanus and Marcus Helvius are appointed as their first Governors with a mandate of one year.
- 194 BC- First mention of the Lusitanians as enemies of Rome by Livy. They entered Hispania Ulterior and sack several cities in the valley of the River Baetis (modern Guadalquivir). they were defeated by the praetor Publius Cornelius Scipio Nasica near Ilipa while returning to Lusitania loaded with booty.
- 191/190 BC - The Lusitanians penetrated into Bastetania and defeated a Roman Garrison. Lucius Aemilius Paulus Macedonicus defeated them. He founded a Roman colony of Turris Lascutana thanks of local support against the Lusitanians.
- 188/186 BC - Lusitanian and Celtiberian raids into Hispania Ulterior. The praetors of Hispania Ulterior and Citerior, Gaius Atinius and Lucius Manlius Acidinus, asked Rome for reinforcements, but this was ignored.
- 186 BC - The Lusitanians crossed the River Baetis and took Hasta, near Gades (modern Cádiz). Atinius defeated them, but he is killed in battle.
- 181 BC - Several small pitched battles between the Lusitanians and the praetors Pulbius Manlius are recorded without details.
- 180 BC - Lucius Postimius Albinus and Tiberius Sempronius Gracchus consolidated a defensive line along the River Tagus and extended Hispania Ulterior further north. Albinus pacified the Lusitanians by force. Central Hispania was (for now) under Roman control.
- 163 BC - Lusitanian rebellion. No details recorded.
- 155 BC - The Lusitanians and Vettones raided Hispania Ulterior under Punicus, a Lusitanian chieftain. They crossed the plain of the River Baetis and reached the Mediterranean coast. Punicus was killed in battle by a stone to his head.
- 154 BC
  - Caesarus succeeded Punicus. He defeated the praetor Lucius Mummius. According to legend Caesarus was killed in an ambush near Bragança.
  - The new Lusitanian leader, Caucenus marched south, attacked the Conii (in modern Algarve and Lower Alentejo) because they were allied with Rome. He took their main city, Conistorgis. He crossed into modern Morocco and besieged Ocile.
- 152 BC The praetor, Marcus Atilius penetrated into Lusitania and seized its largest city, Oxthacae.
- 150 BC
  - The praetor of Hispania Ulterior, Servius Sulpicius Galba, was defeated and lost 7000 men.
  - Galba and the consul Lucius Licinius Lucullus (commander in Hispania Citerior) conducted a pincer operation into Lusitania. The Lusitanians sued for peace.
  - Galba butchered by treachery Lusitanians who had gone to him to ask for peace; 9000 people were killed and 20,000 were sold into slavery.
- 147 BC
  - The Lusitanians suffer severe losses at the hands of the Roman army led by Caius Vetilius, appointed governor of Hispania Ulterior.
  - Caius Vetilius promises the Lusitanians lands in the south if they abide by Roman rule. Viriathus, a survivor of Servius Sulpicius Galba's massacre, urges the tribes not to trust the Romans and fight back.
  - Viriathus is acclaimed leader of the Lusitanians.
  - The Lusitanians successfully resist Roman offensive.
  - Caius Vetilius, appointed governor of Hispania Ulterior, is killed in an ambush led by Viriathus.
- 146 BC
  - Viriathus' Lusitanians defeat the Roman forces of Caius Plancius, taking the city of Segobriga.
  - Viriathus' Lusitanians defeat the Roman forces of Claudius Unimanus, governor of Hispania Citerior.
- 145 BC
  - Viriathus' Lusitanians defeat the Roman forces of Caius Nigidius.
  - Quintus Fabius Maximus Aemilianus is appointed governor of Hispania Citerior and given the specific task of helping Caius Lelius defeat Viriathus and the Lusitanians. The Romans achieve some military victories.
- 143 BC
  - The Roman forces of Fabius Maximus Aemilianus are defeated in Ossuma (near modern Córdoba).
  - The Roman forces of Fabius Maximus Aemilianus are totally defeated near what is today the city of Beja in Alentejo.
- 142 BC - The governor Quintus Caecilius Metellus Macedonicus attacks the territory of the Vettones, but is not able to take the cities of Numancia and Termancia.
- 142 BC
  - Quintus Fabius Maximus Servilianus, new Consul of Hispania Ulterior, after having sacked several cities loyal to Viriathus in Baetica and southern Lusitania, is defeated by the Lusitanians in Erisane (in Baetica).
  - 141 BC - Quintus Fabius Maximus Servilianus, after the defeat, concluded a peace treaty. Viriatus is declared a friend of the Roman people and his followers are granted land.
- 140 BC * The new consul who was assigned the command of Hisania Ulterior, Quintus Sevilius Caepio pressured the senate to declare the peace unworthy of the dignity of the Roman people.
  - In Hispania Ulterior, Servilius Cipianus, with the aid of Marcus Pompilius Lenas' armies, severely defeat the Lusitanians and oblige Viriathus to take refuge north of the Tagus river and surrender hostages, such as his son father-in-law, Astolpas.
  - Servilius Caepio armies also attack the Vettones and the Gallaecians.
  - Servilius Caepio founds the Roman cities of Castra Servilia and Caepiana (in the territory of the Celtici).
  - Viriathus send emissaries to negotiate the peace with Servilius Caepio.
  - Viriathus is betrayed and killed in his sleep by his companions (that had been sent as emissaries to Servilius Caepio), Audax, Ditalcus and Minurus, bribed by Marcus Pompilius Lenas.
  - When Audax, Ditalcus and Minurus return to receive their reward by the Romans, the Consul Servilius Cipianus orders their execution, declaring, "Rome does not pay traitors".
  - Viriathus' Lusitanian armies, now led by Tautalus, still tries a southern incursion against the Romans, but are defeated. End of the Lusitanian War.
  - The Romans grant the Lusitanians lands in the south of Lusitania (in modern Alentejo).
- 138 BC
  - First big Roman campaign deep inside present Portuguese territory led by Consul Decimus Junius Brutus Callaicus. Decimus Junius Brutus, having in his back a pacified southern Lusitania (modern Alentejo and Algarve), established headquarters in the Valley of the Tagus (probably in the site of the Castle of Almourol) and had the allied city of Olisipo (modern Lisbon) fortified before advancing north, destroying settlements as he went. His defeat of a combined army of 60,000 Lusitanians, Gauls, and Callaici earned Decimus a "triumph" and the cognomen Callaicus.
  - The city of Olisipo (modern Lisbon) sends men to fight alongside the Roman legions against the Celtic tribes of the Northwest.
- 137 BC
  - Proconsul Decimus Junius Brutus advances further north, mainly along the coastline, and establishes a fortified position in the area of modern Viseu.
  - The Roman legions cross the Douro river and enter the territory of the Gallaecians.
  - The Roman legions reluctantly cross the Lima river (Lethe, the river of forgetfulness), only after Decimus Junius Brutus crossed alone and called for them, thus proving he had not lost his memory.
- 136 BC
  - Roman legions under Proconsul Decimus Junius Brutus reach the Minho river, but do not cross it for fear of losing their memories, again fearing they had reached the Lethe, the river of forgetfulness.
  - Decimus Junius Brutus lays siege and conquers the city of Talabriga, thus defeating the Gallaecians. After the military campaigns, the Roman legions departed south and left no garrisons.
  - The Roman Senate grants Praetor Decimus Junius Brutus the title Callaicus for his campaigns in Gallaecia.
- 133 BC
  - The Celtiberians are defeated ending the Numantian War
- 132 BC
  - A delegation of Roman Senators visits the new conquered territories in Iberian Peninsula so as to see what needs to be accomplished so Hispania could be incorporated into the growing empire.
- 114 BC
  - Praetor Gaius Marius is sent to govern Lusitania and has to deal with minor Lusitanian unruliness.
- 113 BC
  - Romans score victories against Lusitanian attacks with Praetor Gaius Marius and Proconsul Decimus Junius Brutus (who replaced Marius), but still the Lusitanians resist with a long guerrilla war. Eventually they are defeated.
  - Beginning of the progressive consolidation of Roman administration and control.
- 105 BC-102 BC - After the Battle of Arausio, the Germanic Teutons and Cimbri plunder through all north Iberia as far as Gallaecia, before moving out and being defeated in the battles of Aquae Sextiae and Vercellae.

=== 1st century BC ===
- 97 BC - The General Quintus Sertorius serves in Iberia for the first time.
- 96 BC-94 BC - Publius Licinius Crassus (father of Marcus Licinius Crassus) Governor of Hispania Ulterior, leads a military expedition to the Northwest and finds the source mines of Tin.
- 83 BC - Quintus Sertorius goes to Iberia for a second time, where he represented the Marian party (of Gaius Marius) against Lucius Cornelius Sulla in the Roman Republican civil wars.
- 83 BC-72 BC - Quintus Sertorius Hispanic revolt, where he is joined by the Lusitanians.
- 81 BC - Generalized Roman Republican war in all of Iberia.
- 80 BC
  - Battle of the Baetis River, where rebel forces under Quintus Sertorius defeat the legal Roman forces of Lucius Fufidius, governor of Hispania Ulterior.
  - Quintus Sertorius' second in command, Hirtuleius, defeats the governor of Hispania Citerior.
- 79 BC
  - Quintus Sertorius' armies control most of Hispania Ulterior and parts of Hispania Citerior.
  - The appointed governor of Hispania Ulterior, Quintus Caecilius Metellus Pius, attacks the positions of Quintus Sertorius' armies, namely the city of Lacobriga (probably Lagos in the Algarve), but is unable to take it.
- 77 BC
  - Quintus Sertorius is joined by the General Marcus Perperna Vento from Rome, with a following of Roman nobles.
  - Quintus Sertorius defeats the generals Gnaeus Pompeius Magnus and Quintus Caecilius Metellus Pius at the Battle of Saguntum.
  - In this period Quintus Sertorius, through pacts of hospitability and clientele, establishes strong solidarity with local indigenous populations.
  - Quintus Sertorius founds a Roman school for the children of its local allies in Lusitania.
- 76 BC
  - Quintus Sertorius defeats Gnaeus Pompeius Magnus near the Pyrenees.
  - In Baetica, Quintus Caecilius Metellus Pius defeats Hirtuleius, who is obliged to flee.
- 75 BC
  - Quintus Caecilius Metellus Pius again defeats Hirtuleius and is able to join his armies with those of Gnaeus Pompeius Magnus.
  - Battle of the Sucro where Quintus Caecilius Metellus Pius, Gnaeus Pompeius Magnus and Lucius Afranius defeat Quintus Sertorius.
- 74 BC - Probable expedition to Cale (in Gallaecia, near the modern city of Porto?) promoted by Marcus Perperna Vento.
- 73 BC - Quintus Sertorius loses all the region of Celtiberia (north central Iberia).
- 72 BC
  - Quintus Sertorius is assassinated at a banquet, Marcus Perperna Vento, it seems, being the chief instigator of the deed due to his grudge against the privileges of non-Roman military commanders.
  - Marcus Perperna Vento assumes the command of Quintus Sertorius' armies, but is swiftly defeated by Gnaeus Pompeius Magnus. This marks the end of the Sertorian War.
  - Quintus Caecilius Metellus Pius pacifies and submits Hispania Ulterior. The regions north of the Tagus river are still not effectively occupied by the Roman Republic.
- 69 BC - Julius Caesar was elected Quaestor by the Assembly of the Roman People, at the age of 30, as stipulated in the Roman Cursus honorum, having been assigned with a quaestorship in Lusitania (part of Hispania Ulterior, whose governor was then Antistius Vetus).
- 61 BC
  - Julius Caesar is assigned to serve as the Propraetor governor of Hispania Ulterior.
  - Julius Caesar attacks the Lusitanian areas between the Tagus and the Douro rivers, from his headquarters in Scallabis (modern Santarém).
  - Julius Caesar personally conducts an important naval expedition to the shores of Gallaecia.
- 60 BC - Julius Caesar wins considerable victories over the Gallaecians and Lusitanians. During one of his victories, his men hailed him as Imperator in the field, which was a vital consideration in being eligible for a triumph back in Rome.
- 59 BC - Julius Caesar, Marcus Licinius Crassus Dives and Gnaeus Pompeius Magnus make an agreement by which they establish the First Triumvirate.
- 56 BC - The agreement establishing the First Triumvirate is renewed.
- 53 BC
  - Marcus Licinius Crassus Dives dies in Parthia.
  - Gnaeus Pompeius Magnus is granted Hispania as a Proconsulular Province.
  - Gnaeus Pompeius Magnus delivers the rule of the two Roman provinces of Hispania Citerior and Hispania Ulterior to his lieutenants Marcus Terentius Varro and Marcus Petreius, respectively.
  - Marcus Petreius commands two Roman legions in Lusitania, between the frontier areas of the Lusitanians and the Vettones (at the edge of Roman effective control).
- 50 BC
  - Open hostility between Julius Caesar and Gnaeus Pompeius Magnus, the first favouring the Populares and the second the Optimates in their struggle for power.
  - Julius Caesar is asked by the Roman Senate to give up his troops, but he refuses.
- 49 BC
  - January 1, The Roman Senate receives a proposal from Julius Caesar that he and Gnaeus Pompeius Magnus should lay down their commands simultaneously. The Senate rejects Julius Caesar's final peace proposal and declares him a Public Enemy.
  - January 10, Julius Caesar crosses the Rubicon, pronouncing the famous phrase Alea iacta est ("The die has been cast"). Beginning of the Roman Civil War.
  - Julius Caesar goes into Hispania and defeats the legions of Gnaeus Pompeius Magnus' legates, Marcus Terentius Varro, Marcus Petreius and Lucius Afranius, leaving Gaius Cassius Longinus as legate and facing growing difficulties in maintaining local populations obedient to Rome.
- 48 BC
  - Julius Caesar is elected Dictator, but only serves the office for 11 days.
  - Julius Caesar is named Consul for a period of five years.
  - September 29, Gnaeus Pompeius Magnus is assassinated.
  - Gaius Cassius Longinus, Caesar's legate in Hispania, leads a campaign against the city of Medobrega and other regions of northern Lusitania, where he installs military garrisons that face a lot of local resistance.
- 46 BC
  - Julius Caesar proceeds to North Africa where he defeats the remnants of Pompey's Senatorial supporters (the Optimates) under Marcus Porcius Cato Uticencis.
  - Julius Caesar is again elected Dictator and introduces the Julian Calendar.
  - Pompey's sons Gnaeus Pompeius and Sextus Pompeius, together with Titus Labienus, Caesar's former propraetorian legate (legatus propraetore) and second in command in the Gallic War, escaped to Hispania, where they continued to resist Caesar's dominance of the Roman world.
  - November, Julius Caesar arrives in Hispania with eight legions and 8,000 cavalry of his own. Caesar's arrival was completely unexpected by the enemy, and the surprise gave him an early advantage.
  - Gaius Octavianus and Marcus Vipsanius Agrippa join Julius Caesar in Hispania, where the Civil War continues.
- 45 BC
  - Battle of Munda, in southern Hispania, where, in his last victory, Julius Caesar defeats the Pompeian forces of Titus Labienus and Gnaeus Pompeius.
  - Sextus Pompeius, departing from his garrison at Corduba (in Baetica), roams Hispania Ulterior fighting against its governor (appointed by Julius Caesar), before fleeing for Sicily. End of the Roman Civil War.
  - Julius Caesar, before going back to Rome, leaves his legate governors with the mission of pacifying Hispania and punish the local tribes for their disloyalty. Once again resistance grows and the Romans will have to deal with small local uprising in the years to come.
  - Julius Caesar adopts Gaius Octavianus who becomes Gaius Julius Caesar Octavianus.
  - Julius Caesar returns to Rome victorious and is Named Pater Patriae and Dictator (3rd time) by the Roman Senate.
  - Gnaeus Pompeius Magnus is deified by the Roman Senate through the request of Julius Caesar.
- 44 BC
  - Julius Caesar is appointed dictator in perpetuity (dictator perpetuo).
  - February, Julius Caesar refuses the diadem offered by Marcus Antonius, thus demonstrating that he did not intend to assume the throne as King of Rome.
  - Ides March: Julius Caesar, dictator of Rome, is assassinated by a group of Roman senators. Beginning of the end of Roman Republic period and establishment of Roman Empire.
- 42 BC - Julius Caesar is formally deified as "the Divine Julius" (Divus Julius).
- 39 BC-29 BC - Several Roman governor of Hispania Ulterior celebrate Roman triumphs in Rome for their victories in submitting the rebellious local tribes and nations.
- 27 BC
  - January 16 - Gaius Julius Caesar Octavianus becomes Roman Emperor as Caesar Augustus. Definitive end of the Roman Republic and establishment of the Roman Empire.
  - The Roman general and politician Marcus Vipsanius Agrippa divides all Hispania into 3 parts, Lusitania, Baetica and Tarraconensis.
  - The emperor Augustus returns to Hispania and makes a new administrative division, creating the province of Hispania Ulterior Lusitania, whose capital was to be Emerita Augusta (currently Mérida). Originally Lusitania included the territories of Asturias and Gallaecia, but these were later ceded to the jurisdiction of Provincia Tarraconensis and the former remained as Provincia Lusitania et Vettones.
- 28-24 BC
  - Augustus' military campaigns pacificate all Hispania under Roman rule.
  - Foundation of the Roman cities of Asturica Augusta (Astorga) and Bracara Augusta (Braga), to the north, and, to the south, Emerita Augusta (Mérida) (settled with the emeriti of the 5th and 10th legions).
- 23 BC - The emperor Augustus establishes the Principate and the Pax Romana.

=== 1st century ===
- 14 - Tiberius becomes Roman Emperor.
- 37 - Caligula becomes Roman Emperor.
- 41 - Claudius becomes Roman Emperor.
- 54 - Nero becomes Roman Emperor.
- 65 - Emperor Nero orders his former tutor and advisor Lucius Annaeus Seneca the Younger and his nephew Marcus Annaeus Lucanus, both born in Hispania Baetica, to commit suicide.
- 68 - Galba becomes Roman Emperor.
- 69
  - January - Otho and Vitellius become Co-Emperors.
  - July 1 - Vespasian is proclaimed Roman Emperor against the surviving Co-Emperor Vitellius.
  - December 22 - Co-Emperor Vitellius dies. Vespasian becomes sole Emperor.
- 79 - Titus becomes Roman Emperor.
- 81 - Domitian becomes Roman Emperor.
- 96 - Nerva becomes Roman Emperor.
- 98 - Trajan, born in Hispania Baetica, becomes Roman Emperor.

=== 2nd century ===
- 103 - Probable date of death of the poet Martial, born in Hispania Tarraconensis.
- 117 - Hadrian, born in Hispania Baetica, becomes Roman Emperor.
- 138 - Antoninus Pius becomes Roman Emperor.
- 161 - Marcus Aurelius and Lucius Verus become Co-Emperors.
- 169 - Marcus Aurelius becomes sole Emperor.
- 177 - Commodus becomes Co-Emperor with Marcus Aurelius.
- 180 - Commodus becomes sole Emperor.
- 193
  - January 1 - Pertinax becomes Roman Emperor.
  - March 28 - Didius Julianus becomes Roman Emperor.
  - April 9 - Septimius Severus becomes Roman Emperor.

=== 3rd century ===
- Braga becomes an Episcopal Diocese.
- 211
  - February 4 - The brothers Caracalla and Geta become Co-Emperors.
  - December - Caracalla kills his brother Geta and becomes sole Emperor.
- after 211- The Emperor Caracalla makes a new administrative division which lasts only a short time. He splits Hispania Citerior again into two parts, creating the new provinces Hispania Nova Citerior and Asturiae-Calleciae (the later under governor Cerealis).
- 217 - Macrinus and Diadumenian become Co-Emperors.
- 218 - Elagabalus becomes Roman Emperor.
- 222 - Alexander Severus becomes Roman Emperor.
- 235 - Roman Imperial Crisis of the Third Century, from 235 until 284 great confusion in the Imperial seat.
- 238 - The unified province Tarraconensis or Hispania Citerior is reestablished. Asturias and Gallaecia are again part of it.
- 284 - Diocletian becomes Roman Emperor. Beginning of the Dominate period. Under Emperor Diocletian, Lusitania kept its borders and was ruled by a Praeses, later by a Consularis; finally, it was united with the other provinces to form the Diocesis Hispaniarum ("Diocese of Hispania").
- 286 - Maximian becomes Co-Emperor with Diocletian.

=== 4th century ===
- 303 – Emperor Diocletian orders the persecution of Christians.
- 305 – Diocletian and Maximian abdicated. Constantius and Galerius becomes Augusti. Maximinus is appointed Caesar in the east and Severus in the west. Partition of the Roman Empire. Multiplication of Emperors.
- 318 – Excommunication of Arius.
- 325 – The Ecumenical Council of Nicaea.
- 366-383 - Damasus, son of Antonius and Laurentia, born in the Conventus Bracarensis of Gallaecia (near the modern city of Guimarães), is the reigning Pope under the name Damasus I.
- 385 - Paulus Orosius, historian, theologian and disciple of St. Augustine, is probably born in Braga.
- 388 - Paternus becomes bishop of the Episcopal see of Braga.

== See also ==
- Timeline of Portuguese history
  - Timeline of Iberian prehistory
  - Timeline of pre-Roman Iberian history (before the 3rd century BC)
  - Germanic Kingdoms (5th to 8th century)
