= Conquest of Conistorgis =

153 BCE military conflict

- Part of Lusitanian War
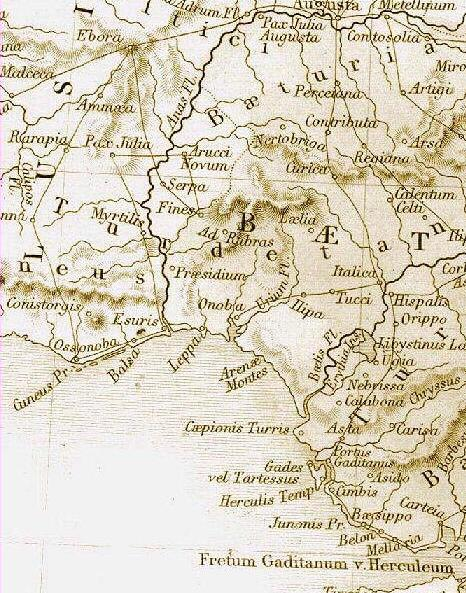
- Map of the Gulf of Cádiz in ancient times, depicting Conistorgis
Date	153 BC
Location	Conistorgis (present day Faro, Portugal)
Result	Lusitanian victory

Belligerents
Roman Republic; Cunei	Lusitanians

Commanders and leaders
Mummius	Caucenus

The Conquest of Conistorgis was a military conflict between the Lusitanians and the Roman Republic.

== Background ==
Previously, Rome had sent Mummius to fight Caesarus. Caesarus was initially defeated; however, while fleeing, they managed to turn the battle around, killing 9,000 Romans in the end. Mummius used his 5,000 remaining soldiers and attacked the Lusitanians by surprise, slaying a large number of them.

== The Battle ==
The Lusitanians on the other side of the Tagus, led by Caucenus, invaded the Cunei, who were subject to Rome, and captured Conistorgis.

== Aftermath ==
In response to the Lusitanian battles, Mummius pursued the Lusitanian forces into Africa. Mummius successfully defeated the Lusitanian rebels and ended the siege at Ocile.

== See also ==
- Battle of the Tagus (153 BC)
- Siege of Ocile
- Conquest of Oxthracae
- Lusitanian War

== Bibliography ==
- Mommsen, Theodor (1891). The History of Rome. Vol. 3. C. Scribner.
- Alexandria, Appianus (1912–1913). Appian's Roman history. Vol. 1. Harvard University Press.
