= Curius and Apuleius =

Lusitanian chief during the Lusitanian war

Curius and Apuleius were chieftains of the Lusitanians, a proto-Celtic tribe from western Hispania. They were active at the last phase of the Lusitanian War.

== Biography ==
Sources describe them as heading a gang of robbers that fought Quintus Fabius Maximus Servilianus while he was entering Lusitania in the search of Viriathus. While it is generally agreed that they commanded Lusitanian forces, their nationality is disputed due to their ostensibly Roman names. It has been argued they might have been either Romanized Iberians or Roman deserters who had adopted local tribal customs. Their relation to Viriathus is also a blurred matter. Oral tradition have them serving as lieutenants to the Lusitanian leader, but it is more likely they were independent rebels from the lands south of the Tajo river, inspired by but not affiliated to Viriathus. In any case, the large size of their forces is considered proof that they were authentic military commanders and not mere bandits.

In 140 BC, after conquering Baeturia and five other cities, Servilianus marched with his remnant 17,000 soldiers towards and attacked the Cynetes on his path. When he was approaching the Guadiana river, Curius and Apuleius ambushed him with a contingent of 10,000 men, taking him by surprise and stealing his loot. However, the Lusitanian victory was ephemeral, as they decided to divide their forces in order for Curius to retreat with the plunders and a large number of prisoners. This allowed Servilianus to recover and initiate a counterattack, in which Curius was killed and the loot was recovered. The Romans continued their march through Lusitania, where they would be ultimately defeated by Viriathus and forced to sign a peace treaty.

== Etymology ==
It is traditionally considered they sported Roman names, opening up several theories about their identities. However, it has been suggested ancient chroniclers might have misunderstood their names and turned them into Roman patronymics. Under this view, "Apuleius" might be a corruption of a Celtic name like the preexistent "Apulus" or "Apanus", while "Curius" would come from "Coutius" or "Curundus".

== See also ==
- Punicus
