= Second Celtiberian War =

154–151 BC failed anti-Roman revolt in Hispania

2nd Celtiberian War
- Part of the Celtiberian Wars
| Date | 154 to 151 BC |
| Location | Hispania |
| Result | Roman victory |
| Territorial changes | Rome increased its influence in Celtiberia |

Belligerents
| Roman Republic | Celtiberian tribes (Belli, Titii and Arevaci), Vaccaei |

Commanders and leaders
| Quintus Fulvius Nobilior, Marcus Claudius Marcellus; Blesius † | Carus †; Ambo; Leuco |

The Second Celtiberian War (154–151 BC) was one of the three major rebellions by the Celtiberians (a loose alliance of Celtic tribes living in east central Hispania, among which we can name the Pellendones, the Arevaci, the Lusones, the Titti and the Belli) against the presence of the Romans in Hispania.

In 154 BC, the Roman senate objected to the Belli town of Segeda building a circuit of walls, and declared war. At least three tribes of Celtiberians were involved in the war: the Titti, the Belli (towns of Segeda and Nertobriga) and the Averaci (towns of Numantia, Axinum and Ocilis). After some initial Celtiberian victories, the consul Marcus Claudius Marcellus inflicted some defeats and made peace with the Celtiberians. The next consul, Lucius Licinius Lucullus, attacked the Vaccaei, a tribe living in the central Duero valley which was not at war with Rome. He did so without the authorisation of the senate, with the excuse that the Vaccaei had mistreated the Carpetani. The Second Celtiberian War overlapped with the Lusitanian War of 155–150 BC.

== Causes ==
The classical sources put the blame of starting the Second Celtiberian War on the city of Segeda (near Zaragoza). Appian wrote that the war broke out because this powerful city of the Celtiberian tribe of the Belli persuaded the people of some smaller towns to settle there and was building a circuit of walls seven kilometres long. It also forced the neighbouring Titti to join in. The Belli had agreed to the treaties Tiberius Sempronius Gracchus had made with tribes in Hispania at the end of the First Celtiberian War. Rome considered that Segeda was breaking the treaty. It forbade the building of the wall, demanded the tribute and the provision of a contingent for the Roman army in accordance with the stipulations of Gracchus' treaty. The Segedans replied that the treaty forbade the construction of new towns, but did not forbid the fortification of existing ones. They also said that they had been subsequently released from the tribute and the military contingent by the Romans. This was true, but the senate argued that when it granted such exemptions it always specified that they were to continue only during its pleasure.

Classical sources also comment on other movements and seditions by other cities in the Celtiberian territories, and grave problems in Hispania Ulterior, where Punicus and Caesarus headed a Luso-Vettonic coalition against Rome. It is generally understood then, that the senate decision was so strict not only because it was fearful about the development of Segeda into a powerful city, but also because it was afraid of the development of a large scale rebellion in Hispania.

== Victories of the Celtiberian coalition ==
Expecting a long war in Hispania, the Senate decided in 153 BC for the first time that the election of the magistrates would take place on 1 January, instead of 15 March. This allowed Quintus Fabius Nobilitor to arrive in Hispania and start his campaign early in the year. The people of Segeda, whose wall had not been completed, fled and sought refuge among the Arevaci of Numantia (7 km north of Soria), who welcomed them. The Arevaci initially tried to mediate, but Nobilitor would only accept complete surrender (deditio). Consequently, the Celtiberians raised an army of 20,000 infantry and 500 cavalry, and chose a Segedan, Carus, as its commander. He prepared for an ambush in a thick forest and attacked the nearly 30,000-strong Roman army of Nobilitor. It was a long battle, which the Celtiberians won; 6,000 Romans were killed. Carus was killed together with 6,000 of his men by the Roman cavalry which was guarding the Roman baggage while he was pursuing the fugitives from the battle in a disorderly manner. Nevertheless, the battle was a disaster for the Romans and from then on they would not engage in battle on the day of the festival of the god Vulcan because this defeat occurred on that day.

The Arevaci assembled at the town of Numantia which had strong natural defences, and chose Ambo and Leuco as their leaders. Three days later Nobilitor encamped four kilometres from the town. He was joined by 300 cavalry and ten elephants sent by Masinissa, the king of Numidia, a Roman ally in Africa. Before the ensuing battle Nobilitor placed the elephants at the rear so that they would not be seen and then divided the army into two. During the battle he brought them into view. This frightened the enemy, who had never seen these animals. They fled inside the town. Nobilitor attacked the city walls and there was a fierce battle. Then an elephant was hit by a large falling stone and made a loud noise which frightened the other elephants. They went on the rampage, trampling over the Romans, who took to disorderly flight. The Numantines made a sortie and killed 4,000 Romans and three elephants. Nobilitor then attacked the town of Axinium which stored the enemy supplies, but did not achieve anything. He lost many men and returned to his camp at night. He sent his cavalry commander, Blesius to pursue an alliance with a neighbouring tribe and ask for cavalry assistance. He was given some horsemen, but an ambush was prepared against him when he was on his way back. The allied horsemen fled and the Roman commander and many of his troops were killed. These Roman disasters encouraged the town of Ocilis (Medinaceli, also in the modern province of Soria) to defect to the Celtiberians. The Roman provisions were kept in this town. Nobilitor withdrew to his winter camp and suffered food shortages. Because of this, as well as heavy snowstorms and frost, many of his men died.

In 152 BC Marcus Claudius Marcellus, consul for the third time, took over the command, bringing 8,000 infantry and 500 cavalry to Hispania. An ambush against him was prepared, but he avoided it by moving cautiously and he encamped in front of Ocilis. He seized the town, granted it pardon, took hostages and imposed a fine of thirty talents. His moderation encouraged the people of Nertobriga (a town of the Belli, in the modern province of Zaragoza) to ask for peace. Marcellus asked for 100 cavalry and they agreed. However, in the meantime the Roman rear guard was attacked and a lot of booty was taken. When the promised cavalry arrived its leaders said that this had been done by some people who did not know about the agreement with the Romans. Marcellus chained the horsemen, sold their horses, plundered the countryside and began to besiege the town, which sent a herald to ask for peace again. Marcellus stated that he would not grant peace unless the Arevaci, Belli, and Titti asked for it together. The Nertobriges sent ambassadors to these tribes and asked Marcellus for leniency and for the renewal of the treaty made with Gracchus. This was opposed by some rural people who had been incited to war. Marcellus sent envoys from each party to Rome to carry on their dispute there and sent private letters to the senate urging peace. He wanted to bring the war to an end himself and gain glory this way.

== The Celtiberians send envoys to Rome and agree to stop hostilities ==
Appian wrote that the envoys of the friendly faction were treated as guests in the city, whereas those of the hostile faction were lodged outside the city walls, as customary. Polybius specified that it was the Belli and Titti who had taken the side of Rome. Because of this their envoys were admitted into the city, while those of the Arevaci, as they were enemies, were ordered to encamp on the other side of the River Tiber. The Senate heard the friendly envoys first. They said that if the rebels were not punished properly they would soon take up arms again and make the whole of Hispania inclined to rebel. They asked either that the Roman army should remain in Hispania and that it should be commanded by a consul to check the depredations of the Arevaci or, if the troops were to be withdrawn, that Rome should inflict an exemplary punishment on them. According to Polybius, when the envoys of the Arevaci were heard, they came across as not being willing to submit or to accept defeat and gave the impression that they thought that they had fought more brilliantly than the Romans. They said that they would pay a penalty, should it be imposed on them, but demanded that the Romans revert to the terms of the treaty of Tiberius Gracchus. The officers of Marcus Claudius Marcellus were then heard. It seemed that they were inclined towards peace and the senate thought that the consul was more disposed towards the enemy than the allies. Appian wrote that the senate was not happy that these people had refused the terms put forward earlier by Nobilitor. However, when he described the campaign by Nobilitor he did not mention him making any terms with the Celtiberians. The senate replied that Marcellus would communicate its decision to them.

Polybius wrote that the private opinion of the senate was that what the allies said was true and to the advantage of Rome, that the Arevaci had a high opinion of themselves and that Marcellus was afraid of war. It secretly ordered the officers Marcellus had sent to continue to fight. It mistrusted Marcellus and it was minded to send one of the new consuls to replace him. It made preparations for the campaign as if the future of Hispania depended in this, assuming that if the enemy was defeated all the other tribes would submit to Rome, but if the Arevaci brokered a peace they and all other tribes would be encouraged to resist. Quintus Fulvius Nobilitor spread rumours of continuous battles and great Roman losses and about the valour of the Celtiberians, as well as claims that Marcellus was afraid of continuing the war. The young recruits panicked and found excuses to avoid recruitment which could not be verified. Competent officers were not willing to serve. Then, the young Publius Cornelius Scipio Aemilianus spoke in the senate and asked to be allowed to be sent to Hispania as an officer or a junior commander and that he was ready to assume such role. He was willing to do so even though he had been given the safer task of going to Macedon where he had been invited to go to settle disputes there. All were surprised because of his youth and cautious disposition. He became popular and made those who had been avoiding military service feel ashamed. The young men enlisted and the officers volunteered. Appian wrote that the army to be sent to Hispania was chosen by lot instead of the customary levy. It was the first time this happened. This was because ‘many had complained that they had been treated unfairly by the consuls in the enrolment, while others had been chosen for easy service’.

In 151 BC the new consul, Lucius Licinius Lucullus, was assigned Hispania. While he was on his way, Marcellus told the Celtiberians about the impending war and returned the hostages. He had a long conversation with the chief of the embassy which had gone to Rome. He sought to persuade the Celtiberians to put matters in his hands because he wanted to bring the war to an end before the arrival of Lucullus. After this 5,000 Arevaci took possession of the city of Nertobriga and Marcellus encamped near Numantia. While he was driving the inhabitants inside the wall, their leader asked for a meeting with Marcellus. He said that the Arevaci, Belli and Titti would put themselves in his hands. He demanded and received hostages and money and let them go free, thereby ending the war before Lucullus could relieve him.

== Lucullus' 'illegal' war on the Vaccaei ==
Appian wrote that Lucius Licinius Lucullus was greedy for fame and money and attacked the Vaccaei because he was ‘in straitened circumstances'. This was despite the fact that the senate had not declared war on them and this tribe had never attacked the Romans. He crossed the River Tagus and encamped near the town of Cauca (Coca). The inhabitants asked him what he had come for and what the reason for war was. He replied that they had mistreated the Carpetani and that he had come to their aid. The Caucaei attacked a party of Roman wood cutters and foragers, killed many of them and pursued the fugitives to their camp. In the ensuing battle, being more like a light infantry, they had the advantage at first. However, when they ran out of darts, they fled and 3,000 of them were killed while they were forcing their way through the city gates. The town elders sought peace. Lucullus demanded hostages, 100 talents of silver and a contingent of cavalry for his army. When these were provided, he also demanded that the town be garrisoned by the Romans. This was also agreed and Lucullus ordered 2,000 picked soldiers to seize the city. Then the rest of the Roman army, which had been ordered to kill all adult males, was let in. Only a few out of 20,000 inhabitants managed to escape. Some of them went to other towns. They burnt what they could not take with them to deprive Lucullus of booty.

Lucullus marched on the town of Itercatia (location uncertain), where more than 20,000 infantry and 2,000 cavalry had taken refuge. He called for peace talks. The inhabitants reproached him for the slaughter of the Caucaei and asked him if he intended to do the same to them. Appian wrote: "he, like all guilty souls, being angry with his accusers instead of reproaching himself, laid waste their fields". He then began a siege and repeatedly lined up his men for battle to provoke a fight. The enemy did not respond, save for one man who often rode into the gaps between the Roman armies and challenged them to single combat. Nobody accepted and he went back to making insulting gestures. Then the young Scipio Aemilianus accepted and luckily defeated this big man despite the size difference. This lifted the spirit of the Romans. However, the next night an enemy cavalry contingent which had gone out foraging before Lucullus had arrived ran about shouting while those inside the city also shouted. This caused terror in the Roman camp. The soldiers were sick due to lack of sleep and dysentery caused by the local food, to which they were not accustomed. Many died of the latter. When some of the siege works were completed the Romans knocked down a section of the city walls, but the attackers were quickly overpowered. They fled and, not knowing the area, many fell into a reservoir and died. The enemy repaired the wall. As both sides suffered famine, Scipio Aemilianus proposed peace and promised that it would not be violated. The Itercalati trusted him and gave Lucullus 10,000 cloaks, some cattle and fifty hostages as part of the terms.

Next Lucullus went to Pallantia (Pelencia). This town was hosting a large number of refugees and was renowned for its bravery. He was advised to avoid it, but he heard that it was a rich town. He encamped there and did not leave until constant harassment of the Roman foragers by the Pallantian cavalry prevented him from getting supplies. The Romans withdrew and were pursued by the enemy until they reached the River Durius (Douro). Then they went back home at night. Lucullus went to the territory of the Tudretani and went into winter camps. This was the end of his illegal war against the Vaccaei. He was never called to account for it.

Appian commented: "As for the gold and silver that Lucullus was after (and for the sake of which he had waged this war, thinking that all of Hispania abounded with gold and silver), he got nothing. Not only did they have none, but these particular [tribes] did not set any value on those metals.

In his account of the Lusitanian War, Appian wrote that Lucullus and Servius Sulpicius Galba, a praetor who was in charge of the troops in Hispania Ulterior and was campaigning against a Lusitanian rebellion, conducted a joint pincer operation against Lusitania. According to Appian they gradually depopulated it. Appian described Galba as being even more Greedy than Lucullus. He killed many Lusitanians by treachery.

== Aftermath ==
In 147 BC, four years after the end of the Second Celtiberian War, the Lusitanians, who had rebelled between 155 BC and 150 BC, rebelled again in the Viriathic War (147–139 BC). In 144 BC, the fourth year of this war, Viriathus, the Lusitanian leader, incited the Celtiberians to rebel. This led to the Numantine War (143–133 BC), which was the longest war of resistance against the Romans.
