= Siege of the Blastophoenicians =

- Part of Lusitanian War
Date	155 BC
Location	Unknown
Result	Lusitanian victory

Belligerents
Roman Republic; Blastophoenicians	Lusitanians; Vettones

Commanders and leaders
Unknown	Punicus †

The siege of the Blastophoenicians was a military conflict between the Lusitani-Vetonne forces and the Roman Republic.

== Background ==
In 155 BC, Punicus began attacking neighboring lands belonging to Roman subjects. In this raid, the Lusitanians killed 6,000 Romans, including a quaestor named Terentius Varro. After this first victory, the Lusitanians formed an alliance with the Vettones. Together, the Lusitanians and Vettones laid siege to the Blastophoenicians, a Phoenician settlement subject to Rome.

== Siege ==
The allied Lusitani-Vetonne forces were successful in their siege, however, during the siege, Punicus was struck on the head with a stone and killed.

== Aftermath ==
After his death, Punicus was succeeded by lieutenant Caesarus, who continued his campaign.

== See also ==
- Viriathus
- Lusitanian War
