= Siege of Ocile =

- Part of Lusitanian War
Date	153 BC
Location	Ocile, North Africa
Result	Roman victory

Belligerents
Roman Republic	Lusitanians

Commanders and leaders
Mummius	Unknown

Strength
9,000 infantry 500 cavalry	Unknown

Casualties and losses
Unknown	15,000 killed

The siege of Ocile was a military conflict between the Lusitanians and the Roman Republic.

== Background ==
The Lusitanians, on the other side of the Tagus, led by Caucenus, invaded the Cunei, who were subject to Rome, and captured Conistorgis. Some of Lusitanians then raided North Africa, laying siege to a city named Ocile, possibly current day Asilah.

== Siege ==
Mummius followed the Lusitanians, with 9000 foot and 500 horse, and slew about 15,000 of them who were engaged in plundering, and a few of the others, and raised the siege of Ocile.

== Aftermath ==
After his victory in Ocile, Mummius returned to Rome, where he was awarded a triumph. He was then succeeded by Marcus Atilius.

== See also ==
- Viriathus
- Lusitanian War

== Sources ==
- Appian's History of Rome.
