= Battle of the Tagus (153 BC) =

- Part of Lusitanian War
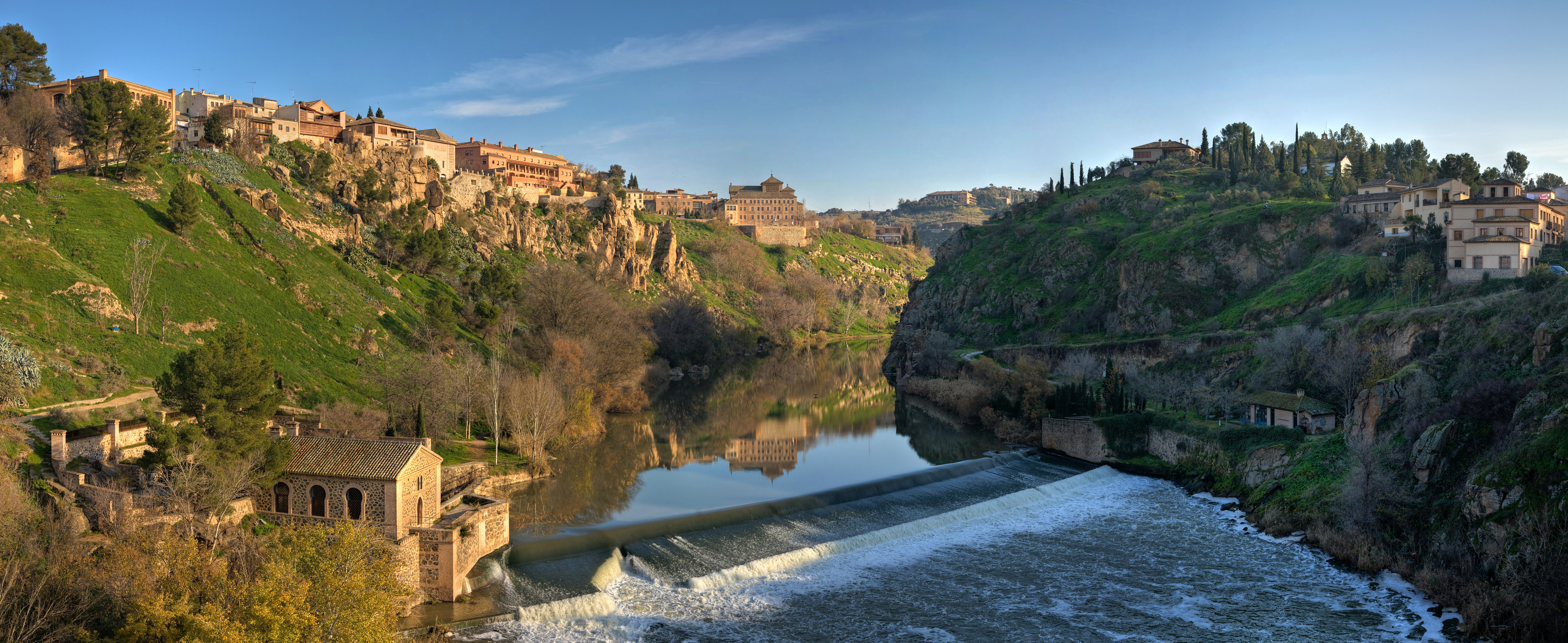
- View of Tagus River in Toledo, Spain
Date	153 BC
Location	Tagus River, Iberian Peninsula
Result	Lusitanian victory

Belligerents
Roman Republic	Lusitanians

Commanders and leaders
Mummius	Caesarus

Strength
Unknown	Unknown

Casualties and losses
9,000 killed	Unknown

The Battle of the Tagus (153 BC) was a military conflict between the Lusitanians and the Roman Republic.

== Background ==
In 154 BC, the Lusitanians, under the leadership of Punicus, launched an invasion into Roman territory, where they achieved a decisive victory against two Roman governors who had combined their forces to oppose them. The defeat severely impacted Roman control, leading to the intervention of the Roman Senate. The Vettones, a tribe residing between the Tagus and Upper Douro, were influenced by this success and joined the Lusitanians in their resistance. This alliance enabled the Lusitanians to extend their raids, reaching the Mediterranean and even threatening the territories of the Blastophoenicians near New Carthage (Cartagena). The situation grew so serious that Rome sent a consul to Spain.

== Battle ==
Before the consul Quintus Fulvius Nobilior could arrive with his forces, a significant engagement occurred on the right bank of the Tagus River between the Roman praetor Lucius Mummius and the Lusitanians, now led by Caesarus after Punicus's death. Initially, the Romans gained success, breaking the Lusitanian army and capturing their camp. However, Roman forces, already fatigued from their march and disorganized during the pursuit, were caught off guard. The Lusitanians, despite their earlier defeat, managed to rally and turned the tide of the battle. In the end, the Romans suffered a crushing defeat, losing their camp and 9,000 men.

== Aftermath ==
After their victory, the Lusitanians crossed the Tagus and attacked the Cunei and conquered their town, Conistorgis. They sent the captured Roman standards to the Celtiberians, urging them to join the rebellion. This message ignited further unrest, particularly among the Celtiberian tribes. The Romans, now faced with a growing coalition of native tribes, were forced to reconsider their strategy in Iberia, leading to the eventual deployment of additional forces under Consul Quintus Fulvius Nobilior to regain control of the region.
