= Siege of Pallantia =

- Part of Second Celtiberian War
Date	151 BC
Location	Pallantia
Result	Vaccaei victory

Belligerents
Roman Republic	Vaccaei

Commanders and leaders
Lucullus	Unknown

The siege of Pallantia was a military conflict between the Vaccaei and the Roman Republic.

== Background ==
Lucullus's unauthorized campaign in Hispania was part of a broader Roman effort to subdue the Iberian tribes, including the Vaccaei and Celtiberians. The warlike Iberians fiercely resisted Roman incursions, leading to decades of warfare. Lucullus then went to Pallantia, after discovering that it was a rich town, despite being advised not to.

== Siege ==
Lucullus advanced towards the city of Pallantia, ignoring previous advice to avoid it. His army, however, faced relentless harassment from the Pallantian cavalry, preventing them from gathering supplies. Being unable to get food, Lucullus withdrew his army, and still pursued by the Pallantians as far as the Douro River.

== Aftermath ==
Following his retreat from Pallantia, Lucullus took his army to Turdetania and went into winter quarters. This was the end of the war with the Vaccaei, which was waged by Lucullus contrary to the authority of the Roman people, but he was never even called to account for it.

== See also ==
- Celtiberians
- Celtiberian Wars
- Second Celtiberian War

== Sources ==
- Appian's History of Rome.
