= Lucius Caecilius Metellus Calvus =

Roman senator

Lucius Caecilius Metellus Calvus (c. 200 BC or before 178 BC – after 136 BC) was a Roman statesman. He was a son of Quintus Caecilius Metellus and brother of Quintus Caecilius Metellus Macedonicus. First Calvus used to be a Praetor, later a Consul and Governor of Hispania in 142 BC, where he fought, without success, against Viriathus, then he became a Proconsul of Cisalpine Gaul in 141 BC, and from 140 BC to 139 he was a Legate. Also during those years, Calvus participated in an embassy to some Eastern states.

== Children ==
Calvus' children were:

- Lucius Caecilius Metellus Dalmaticus
- Quintus Caecilius Metellus Numidicus
- Caecilia Metella, wife of Lucius Licinius Lucullus, son of Lucius Licinius Lucullus

== See also ==
- Caecilia gens

== Notes ==
Political offices
Preceded by Appius Claudius Pulcher; Q. Caecilius Metellus Macedonicus	Roman consul 142 BC; With: Q. Fabius Maximus Servilianus	Succeeded by Gnaeus Servilius Caepio; Quintus Pompeius
