= Appius Claudius Pulcher (consul 143 BC) =

Roman politician and general

Appius Claudius Pulcher (Latin: APP•CLAVDIVS•C•F•APP•N•PVLCHER) was a Roman politician of the 2nd century BC.

== Life ==
Son of Gaius Claudius Pulcher (who was consul in 177 BC), he was elected consul for 143 BC, and, to obtain a pretext for a triumph, attacked the Salassi, an Alpine tribe. He was at first defeated, but afterwards, following the directions of the Sibylline Books, gained a victory. On his return the celebration of the triumph was refused; but he held a triumph at his own expense, and when one of the tribunes attempted to drag him from his car, his daughter Claudia, one of the Vestal Virgins, walked by his side up to the capital. Next year he was an unsuccessful candidate for the censorship, though he afterwards held that office with Quintus Fulvius Nobilior, probably in 136 BC. He allied with Tiberius Gracchus who married his daughter Claudia. Appius backed Tiberius' land reform bill and in 133 BC with Tiberius and Tiberius' brother, Gaius Gracchus, was chosen commissioner for the division of the lands. Their post allowed them to survey the ager publicus, publicly owned land that Tiberius wanted to distribute to citizens who had lost their property. Another faction in the Senate opposed them and Tiberius was assassinated in 133 BC. Appius was the enemy of Scipio Aemilianus. He died shortly after Tiberius Gracchus, probably in 130 BC. He was one of the Salii, an augur, and princeps senatus. Cicero says that his style of speaking was fluent and vehement. He married Antistia. His great-granddaughter was Clodia.

== Family tree ==
ignota (2) (Fonteia?) married c. 138	Ap. Claudius Pulcher cos. 143, cens. 136 (c. 186–130)	(1) Antistia (Vetorum) married c. 164
Claudia; Vestal born c. 163	Claudia minor Gracchi born c. 161	Ap. Pulcher (c. 159–135/1)	Claudia; Tertia born c. 157	Q. Philippus mint IIIvir c. 129 born 160s, married c. 143
C. Pulcher (c. 136–92) cos. 92	Ap. Pulcher (c. 130–76) cos. 79	Ignota	x	L. Philippus (c. 141–c. 74) cos. 91	Q. Philippus (c. 143–c. 105)
Claudiae maior et minor (born 100–99)	Claudia Tertia; Q. Regis (born c. 98)	Ap. Pulcher (97–49) cos. 54, augur, cens. 50	C. Pulcher (96–c. 30s) pr. 56	Claudia Quarta; Q. Metelli Celeris (born c. 94)	P. Clodius Pulcher tr. pl. 58 (93–53)	Claudia Quinta; L. Luculli (born 92/90)
Claudia maior M. Bruti	Claudia minor ignoti	Claudia; C. Caesaris (born c. 56)

== Notes ==
Political offices
Preceded by Servius Sulpicius Galba; Lucius Aurelius Cotta	Roman consul 143 BC with Quintus Caecilius Metellus Macedonicus	Succeeded by Lucius Caecilius Metellus Calvus; Q. Fabius Maximus Servilianus
Preceded by Scipio Aemilianus; Lucius Mummius Achaicus	Roman consul 136–135 BC with Quintus Fulvius Nobilior	Succeeded by Q. Caecilius Metellus Macedonicus; Quintus Pompeius
