= Lusitanian Wars =

War between Lusitanian people and the Roman Republic

Date	155 to 139 BC
Location	Hispania
Result	Roman victory
Territorial changes	Pacification of Lusitania (modern Portugal between the rivers Tagus and Douro and Extremadura, Spain)

Belligerents
Roman Republic Celtic tribes vassal to Rome (Cynetes, Turdetani...)	Lusitanian tribes Other Celtic tribes (Vettones, Gallaeci...)

Commanders and leaders
Servius Sulpicius Galba; Gaius Vetilius; Gaius Plancius; Gaius Nigidius; Fabius Aemilianus; Fabius Servilianus; Quintus Servilius Caepio; Marcus Popillius Laenas	Viriathus X Tautalus; Curius; Apuleius; Punicus; Caesarus; Caucenus

The Lusitanian Wars, called Pyrinos Polemos ("the Fiery War") in Greek, were wars of resistance fought by the Lusitanian tribes of Hispania Ulterior against the advancing legions of the Roman Republic from 155 to 139 BC. The Lusitanians revolted in 155 BC, and again in 146 BC and were pacified. The wars are important in the integration of what would become Portugal into the Roman and Latin-speaking world.

== Historical context ==
And yet the country north of the Tagus, Lusitania, is the greatest of the nations in Hispania, and is the nation against which the Romans waged war for the longest times.

— Strabo, Book III, Chapter 3, Section 3

In the sequence of the Second Punic War, the Roman Republic defeated Carthage and its colonies in the Mediterranean Coast of the Iberian Peninsula. This marked the first incursion of the Roman Republic into the peninsula and possibly the first clash between Lusitanians and Romans, as Lusitanian mercenaries fought on the Carthaginian side during the Punic Wars. In 194 BC, the Romans launched their first offensives in Lusitanian land.

Rome divided the southeastern coast of Iberia into two provinces, Hispania Citerior and Hispania Ulterior, and two elected praetors were assigned to command the legions. As with many other tribes of Iberia, the inhabitants of the Lusitanian castros, or citanias, would have been granted peregrina stipendiaria but remaining an autonomous (Greek: αὐτονόμων) country through treaties (foedus).

== From Punicus to the Peace Treaty of Atilius (155 BC – 152 BC) ==
The Lusitanian War began in 155 when Punicus attacked neighboring lands belonging to Roman subjects. In this raid, the Lusitanians killed 6,000 Romans, including a quaestor named Terentius Varro. After this first victory, the Lusitanians formed an alliance with the Vettones. Together, the Lusitanians and Vettones laid siege to the Blastophoenicians, a Phoenician settlement subject to Rome. Punicus was killed during this siege and was succeeded by Caesarus.

Rome sent Mummius to fight Caesarus. Caesarus was initially defeated but, while fleeing, managed to turn the battle around, killing 9,000 Romans in the end. Mummius used his 5,000 remaining soldiers and attacked the Lusitanians by surprise, slaying a large number of them.

The Lusitanians on the other side of the Tagus, led by Caucenus, invaded the Cunei, who were subject to Rome, and conquered Conistorgis. Some of the Lusitanians then raided North Africa, laying siege to Ocile. Mummius followed them into Africa and defeated the Lusitanian rebels and ended the siege of Ocile. With this victory, Mummius returned to Rome and was awarded a triumph.

Mummius was succeeded by Marcus Atilius, who fought the Lusitanians and conquered their largest city, Oxthracae. This terrified the neighboring tribes (including the Vettones) into offering their surrender.

== Second Lusitanian Raid and the Treachery of Galba (152 BC – 150 BC) ==
During the winter of 152 BC, the Lusitanians rebelled again and besieged some Roman subjects. Servius Galba, the successor of Atilius, rushed to rescue them. After an initial victory, Galba was defeated while trying to pursue the fleeing Lusitanian forces. About 7,000 Romans were killed, forcing Galba to take refuge in a settlement called Carmone. Galba reassembled his forces and wintered in Conistorgis. Lucullus was wintering in Turditania. Lucullus' forces discovered and attacked Lusitanians, killing 4,000 in the process. He then crossed the straits near Gades, killing another 1,500, and invaded Lusitania. Galba joined in the invasion of Lusitania.

Lucullus and Galba's invasion convinced the Lusitanians to send ambassadors to Galba to renew the treaty they made with Atilius in 152 BC. Galba pretended to accept a truce and promised them fertile land. The Lusitanians, following the good news of the ambassadors, gathered at a place appointed by Galba and were divided into three parts in a plain. Galba approached each Lusitanian division separately, asked them to lay down their arms, and slaughtered them. Viriathus was one of the few Lusitanians who escaped.

== Third Lusitanian Raid and the Feats of Viriathus (148 BC – 140 BC) ==
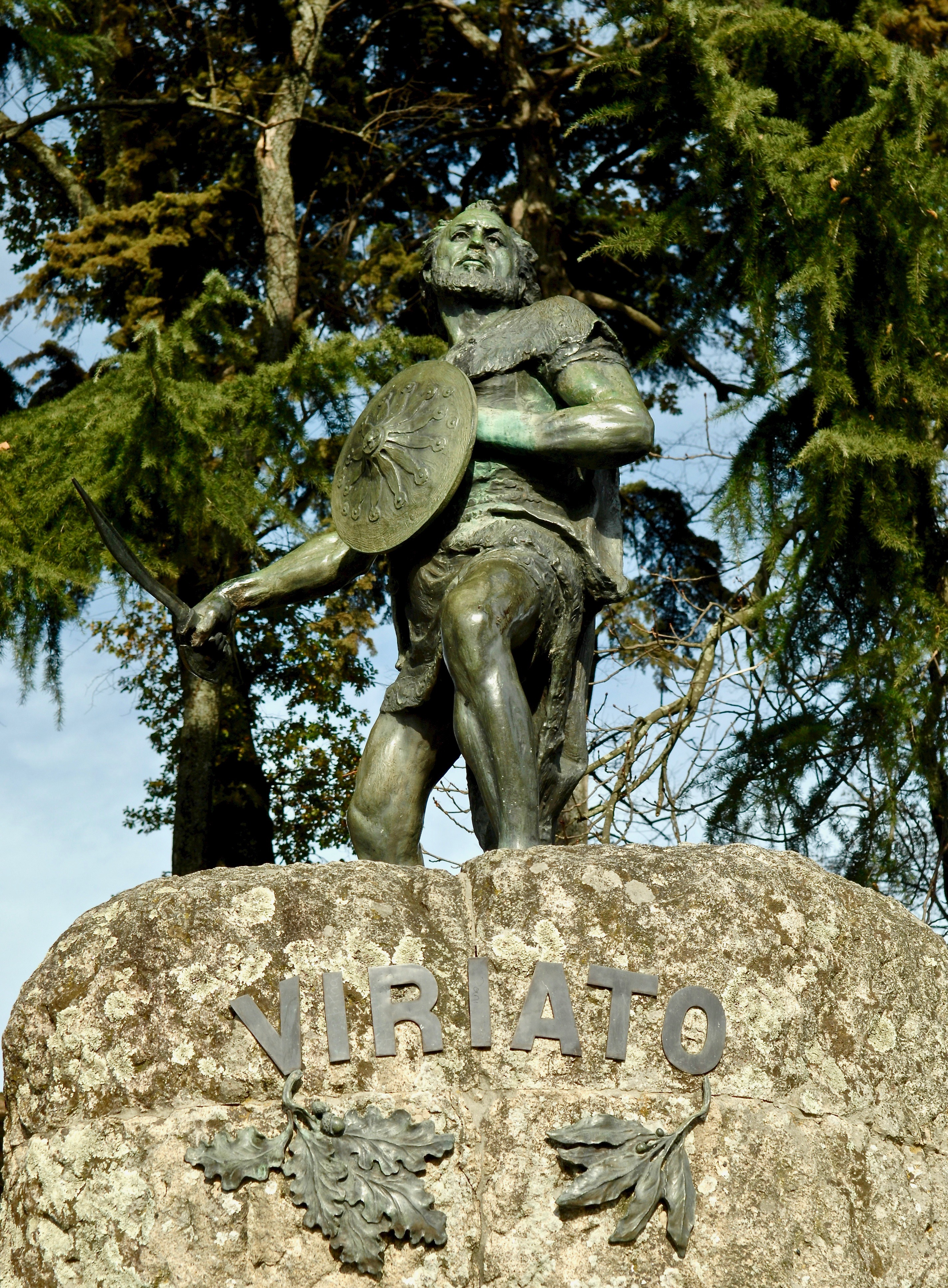
The statue of Viriathus in Viseu, erected in 1940.

In 148 BC, the Lusitanians assembled a force of 10,000 and attacked Turdetania. Gaius Vetilius was sent to deal with the raid. After he amassed a force equal to those of the Lusitanians in numbers, Vetilius defeated the Lusitanians, who ask for peace terms. As peace terms were being arranged, Viriathus reminded his fellow Lusitanians of the treachery of the Romans, which he had witnessed firsthand with Galba. The Lusitanians chose Viriathus as their leader and concocted an escape plan: they would organize as if going into battle, but then flee in every direction and later reassemble in a city named Tribola. Vitilius, seeing the Lusitanian forces scattering, attacked Viriathus directly, but Viriathus and 1000 of his best men occupied Vitilus for two days while the others regrouped to safety. Viriathus then evaded the Romans and rejoined with his army. The success of Viriathus' campaign convinced neighboring Celtic tribes, such as the Gallaecians to support his cause.

Viriathus gained renown throughout the Roman world as a guerrilla fighter. In the words of Theodor Mommsen, "It seemed as if, in that thoroughly prosaic age, one of the Homeric heroes had reappeared." In 148 BC, Vitilius followed Viriathus into Tribola. Viriathus' forces ambushed the Romans. About 6,000 Romans managed to flee to Carpessus with their quaestor, while the remaining of the original 10,000 were either killed or imprisoned. Vitilius himself was killed during this ambush, as he was considered to be of little worth as a slave (he supposedly was old and fat). The Quaestor asked for reinforcements from the Celtic tribes allied to Rome, the Belli and the Titii. However, the 5,000 Belli and Titii forces were all slain in skirmishes against the Lusitanian forces.

In 146 BC, Viriathus raided the Roman vassal Iberians in Carpetania until Gaius Plautius Hypsaeus arrived with 10,000 men on foot and 1,300 on horse. Plautius was defeated by Viriathus, who then proceeded to raid Hispania Ulterior without check.

In 145 BC, the general Quintus Fabius Maximus Aemilianus was sent by Rome to fight the Lusitanians. With the end of the wars against Carthago and Greece, Maximus managed to assemble a great force: 15,000 men on foot and 2,000 on horse. The forces assembled in Urso and skirmished frequently with the Lusitanians, but without full-scale battle.

In 144 BC, Maximus attacked Viriathus and put him to flight, capturing two of his cities in the aftermath. Maximus pursued Viriathus into a place called Baecor, killing many of his men but failing to capture Viriathus. Maximus wintered in Córdoba and then left for Rome. He was succeeded by Quintus Pompeius Aulus.

In 143 BC, Viriathus managed to persuade several other Celtic tribes (Arevaci, Titii, and Belli) to resist the Romans, leading to the Numantine War. Afterwards, Viriathus skirmished with Quintus. He took refuge in a place called Venus mountain, but later returned to battle, slaying 1,000 of Quintus' men. Viriathus drove out the garrison of Ittuca and raided the Iberian Bastetani. Quintus wintered at Córdoba in the middle of autumn and sent Caius Marcius, a Hispanic from Italica, to fight Viriathus.

In 142 BC, Fabius Maximus Servilianus succeeded Quintus, bringing two new legions and more allies, up to a total of 18,000 men on foot and 1,600 on horse. Maximus was reinforced by 300 horse and ten elephants from Africa. Maximus defeated Viriathus, who still managed to inflict 3,000 deaths and drive the Romans back to camp. The Romans were saved by night time and managed to defend their camp initially, but constant attacks by Viriathus drove them back to Itucca. Viriathus returned to Lusitania, but Maximus, instead of following him, raided five towns against Lusitanian allies in Baeturia. Afterwards, he marched against the Cunei and only then into Lusitania.

While moving against Viriathus, Maximus was attacked by an army of 10,000 led by Curius and Apuleius. Curius was killed in battle and Maximus succeeded in capturing the Lusitanian cities of Escadia, Gemella, and Obolcola. Maximus captured around 10,000 men. He beheaded 500 and sold the rest as slaves. While following Viriathus, Maximus' army rested in Erisana. Viriathus managed to infiltrate the town and, in defeating Maximus' armies, asked for an end to the war.

== Caepius, death of Viriathus and the end of the Lusitanian War ==
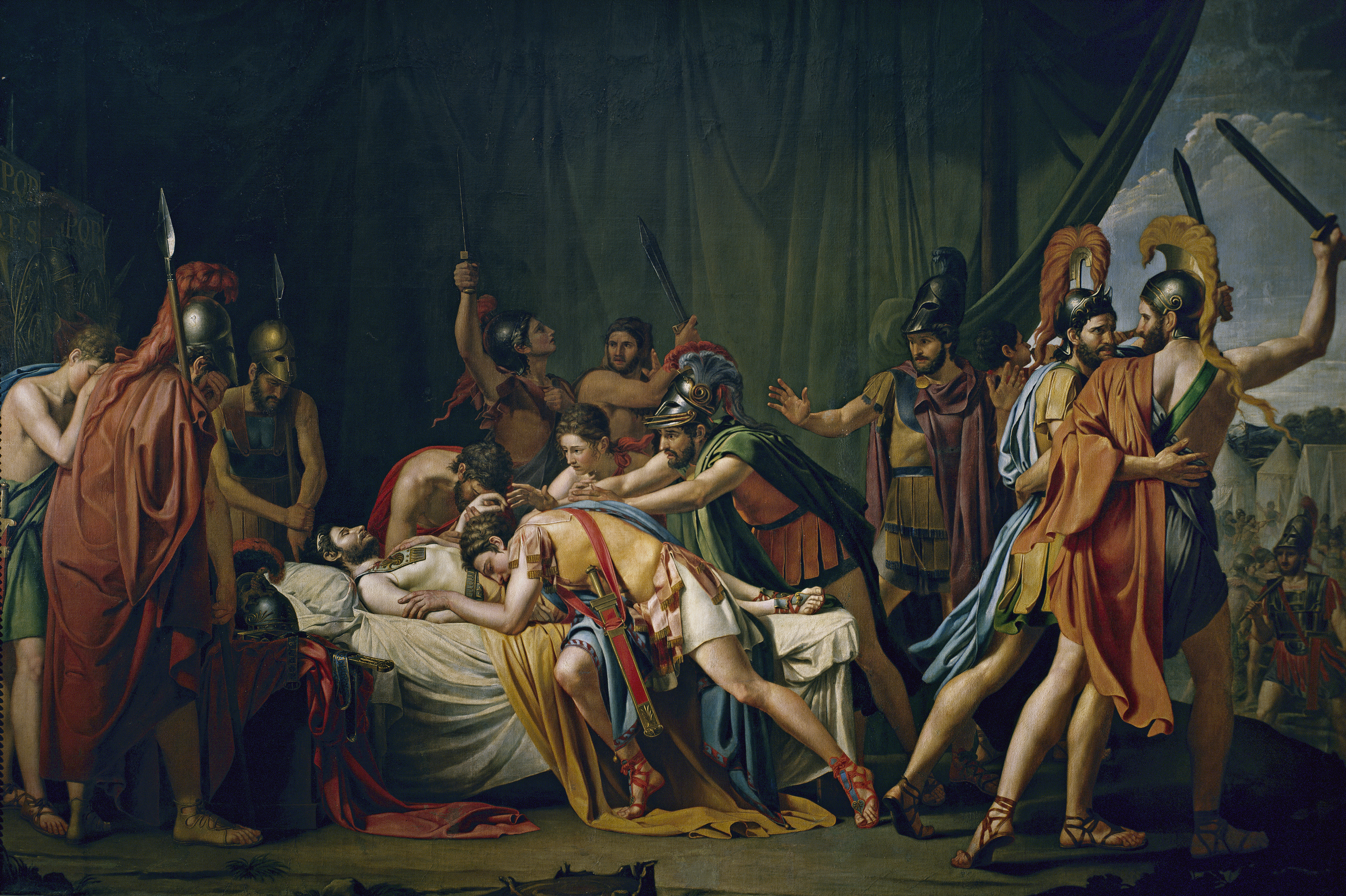
José de Madrazo's painting of the death of Viriatus

In 140 BC, Gnaeus Servilius Caepio succeeded Maximus and wrote to Rome complaining of the treaty made with Viriathus, saying it was unworthy of the dignity of the Roman people. The Senate first permitted Caepio only to fight Viriathus secretly before deciding to break the treaty and declare war against Viriathus. Caepio took the town of Arsa and won a battle over Viriathus, who fled in Carpetania. Although Viriathus escaped, Caepio turned against the Vettones and Gallaeci, destroying their fields.

Afterwards, Viriathus sent his most trusted friends Audax, Ditalcus and Minurus to negotiate peace terms with Caepio. Caepio bribed them to assassinate Viriathus. Viriathus slept little and in his armor but allowed his friends to enter his tent at any time so he could be summoned to battle as soon as possible. Taking advantage of this, his friends entered his tent and killed him in his sleep by slitting his throat. Viriathus was found dead in the morning, long after the assassins had escaped. Unable to avenge him as they knew not who murdered him, the Lusitanians instead held a grand funeral: they dressed Viriathus in special garments, burned him in a pyre, held processions, gladiator battles and songs. The popular story of the traitors' fate says that the Roman general Caepio executed them, declaring that "Rome does not pay traitors".

Tautalus was elected to succeed Viriathus and lead the Lusitanians. The Lusitanians' attempt to raid Saguntum failed. On crossing the river Baetis on their return, they were defeated by Caepio and became Roman subjects. This marked the end of the Lusitanian War.

== Aftermath ==
The end of the Lusitanian Wars began a period of relative peace in Lusitania. The Lusitanians rebelled against the Romans again in 80 to 72 BC, in the Sertorian War, when they recruited the outlaw ex-general Quintus Sertorius to lead a rebellion against Rome.

The Lusitanian War, and Viriathus in particular, would become an enduring symbol of Portuguese nationality and independence (see Lusitanic).

== See also ==
- Roman conquest of Hispania
- Romanization of Hispania
- Numantine War
- Sertorian War
- History of Portugal
- Timeline of Portuguese history
- List of wars involving the Lusitanians

== Sources ==
- Appian's History of Rome.
- Wintle, Justin. The Rough Guide History of Spain. Rough Guides, 2003.
- Encyclopaedia Romana; "The Celtiberian War and Numantia".

== Bibliography ==
- Daniel Varga, The Roman Wars in Spain: The Military Confrontation with Guerrilla Warfare, Pen & Sword Military, Barnsley 2015. ISBN 978-1-47382-781-3
- Leonard A. Curchin, The Romanization of Central Spain: Complexity, Diversity and Change in a Provincial Hinterland, Routledge, an imprint of Taylor & Francis Books Ltd, London 2004. ISBN 978-1-134-45112-8 –
- Luis Berrocal-Rangel, Los pueblos célticos del soroeste de la Península Ibérica, Editorial Complutense, Madrid (1992) ISBN 84-7491-447-7 (in Spanish)
- Luis Silva, Viriathus and the Lusitanian resistance to Rome 155-139 BC, Pen & Sword Military, Barnsley 2013. ISBN 978-1-78159-128-4
- Philip Matyszak, Sertorius and the struggle for Spain, Pen & Sword Military, Barnsley 2013. ISBN 978-1-84884-787-3
- Rafael Trevino and Angus McBride, Rome's Enemies (4): Spanish Armies 218BC-19BC, Men-at-Arms series 180, Osprey Publishing Ltd, London 1986. ISBN 0-85045-701-7
