= Conquest of Oxthracae =

Ancient Rome military conflict

- Part of Lusitanian War
Date	152 BC
Location	Oxthracae
Result	Roman victory

Belligerents
Roman Republic	Lusitanians

Commanders and leaders
Marcus Atilius	Unknown

Strength
Unknown	Unknown

Casualties and losses
Unknown	700 killed

The Conquest of Oxthracae was a military conflict between the Lusitanians and the Roman Republic.

== Events ==
=== Background ===
After the Conquest of Conistorgis by the Lusitanians, some of them went to raid North Africa, laying siege to a city named Ocile, however, Mummius followed them with his remaining 9000 foot and 500 horses, and lifted the siege. Mummius was later sent back to Rome, where he was awarded a triumph. He was then succeeded by Marcus Atilius.

=== The battle ===
After succeeding Mummius, Marcus Atilius made an incursion among the Lusitanians and killed about 700 of them and took their largest city, called Oxthracae. This terrified the neighboring tribes (including the Vettones) into offering their surrender.

=== Aftermath ===
The conquest of Oxthracae terrified the surrounding tribes, including the Vettones, who immediately sought terms of surrender, temporarily securing Roman dominance in the region, however, once Atilius withdrew his forces to winter quarters, the Lusitanians revolted and besieged some of Rome's allied settlements.

== See also ==
- Viriathus
- Lusitanian War

== Sources ==
- Appian's History of Rome.
