= Gnaeus Servilius Caepio (consul 169 BC) =

Gnaeus Servilius Caepio was a Roman statesman. The son of the consul of 203 BC, Gnaeus Servilius Caepio, he also served as consul in 169 BC alongside Quintus Marcius Philippus. He had previously served as curule aedile in 179 BC and as praetor in 174, when he obtained the province of Further Spain.

He had at least three sons, Quintus Fabius Maximus Servilianus, the consul of 142 BC; Gnaeus Servilius Caepio, the consul of 141 BC and censor in 125; and Quintus Servilius Caepio, who was consul in 140 BC.
