= Audax, Ditalcus and Minurus =

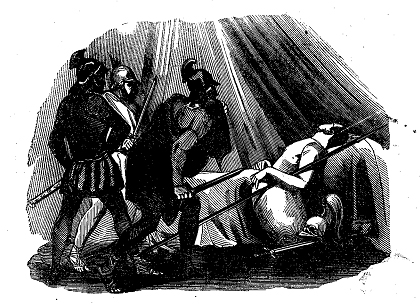
Audax, Ditalcus and Minurus about to murder Viriathus; from Museo de los Niños

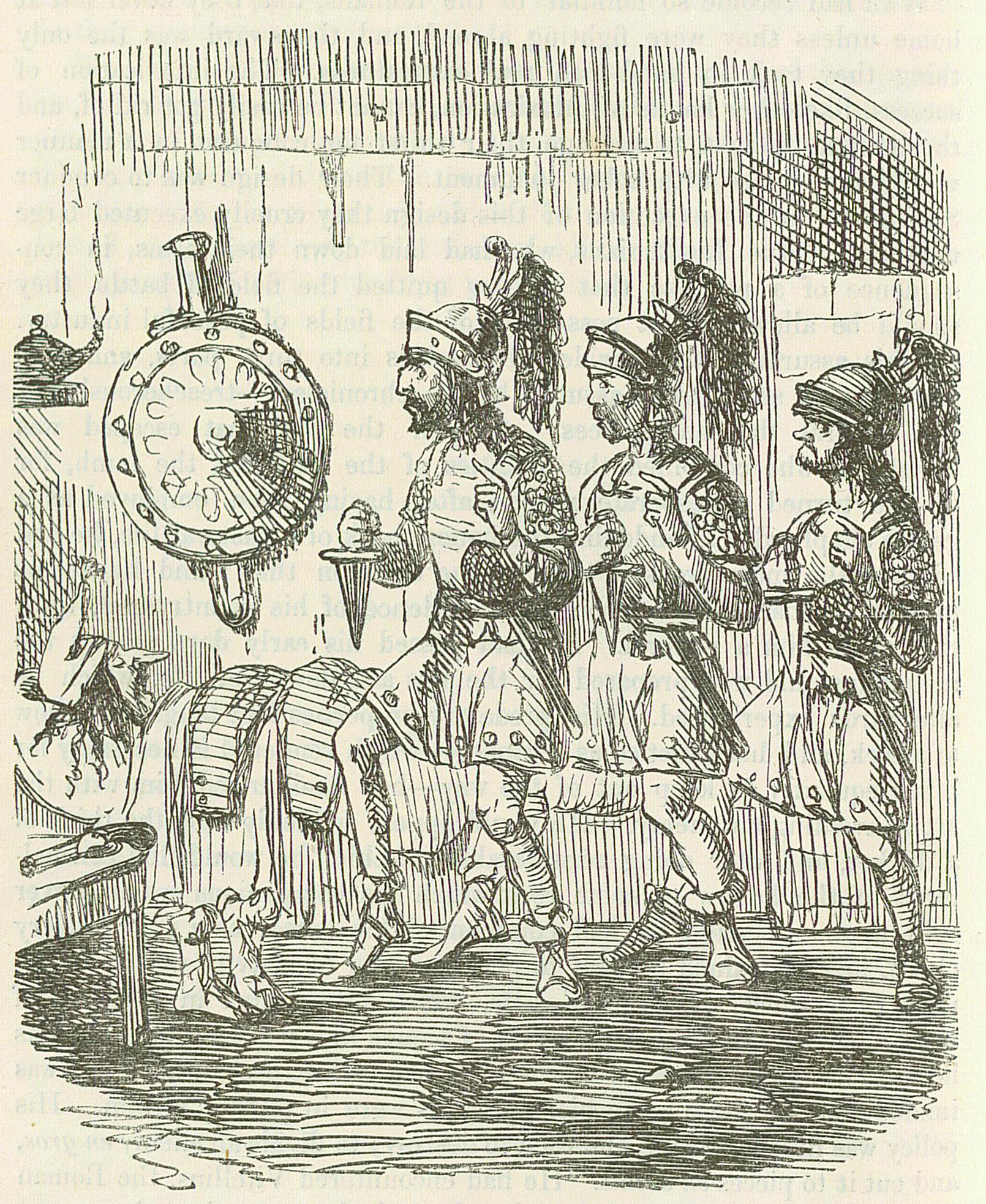
Assassination of Viriathus by Gilbert Abbott à Beckett

Audax, Ditalcus and Minurus were Turdetanian warriors who participated in the Lusitanian War. They were the supposed betrayers and assassins of the Lusitanian leader Viriathus.

== Biography ==
The three came from the city of Urso and allied with Viriathus at some point of the war. In 139 BC, after a long war against the Romans, Viriathus was killed in his sleep by Audax, Ditalcus and Minurus, who had been sent as emissaries to the Romans and had been bribed by Marcus Popillius Laenas. The Roman general Servilius Caepio had them kicked out, declaring "Rome does not pay traitors". According to Appian, Servilius Caepio had paid them and sent them to Rome to collect the rest of the promised payment.

Diodorus says the third killer (Minurus) is called Nicorontes, while Appian calls him Minouros. Another account by Sextus Aurelius Victor says that Caepio paid two royal guards ("satellites") to kill Viriathus.

== Etymology ==
Despite their provenance from Turdetania, their names have been noted as Celtic in origin. It has been proposed they were Celtic aristocrats or mercenaries hired by southern populations, as it was usual at the time and place. Audax (maybe Audas) might come from Auda, meaning "luck" or "wealthy" in Celtic.

== In film and television ==
In the Spanish television series Hispania, La Leyenda (2010-2012), their roles are filled by the characters of Paulo (played by Juan José Ballesta), Sandro (Hovik Keuchkerian) and Darío (Alfonso Bassave). In the series, Paulo and Sandro are actually innocent of Viriathus's death, and are only brought to Rome by Galba as scapegoats along with the real conspirator, Darío.

In the 2016 series Barbarians Rising, Ditalcus is played by Radu Andrei Micu. He is portrayed as the last member of a tribe slain in retaliation to Viriathus's revolt. Other two conspirators, representing Audax and Minurus and played by uncredited actors, can be seen when he murders Viriathus.

== See also ==
- Lusitanian War
- Portugal
- History of Portugal
- Timeline of Portuguese history
- Hispania
- Roman Empire
