= Battle of Tribola =

Military conflict of the Roman Republic

- Part of Lusitanian War
Date	147 BC
Location	Tribola, Iberian Peninsula
Result	Lusitanian victory

Belligerents
Roman Republic	Lusitanians

Commanders and leaders
Gaius Vetilius †	Viriathus

Strength
10,000	1,000

Casualties and losses
4,000 killed	Unknown

The Battle of Tribola was a military conflict between the Lusitanians and the Roman Republic.

== Background ==
In 147 BC, the Roman generals Lucullus and Galba had previously committed atrocities against the Lusitanians, killing many and betraying their trust. Among the survivors was Viriathus. By 147 BC, the Lusitanians, numbering around 10,000, rose up once more under his leadership, driven by a desire for revenge and freedom from Roman oppression.

== Battle ==
Vetilius, commanding a force of 10,000 Romans, set a trap for the Lusitanians leaving them with no choice but to surrender. However, Viriathus, recalling the treacheries of Galba and Lucullus, inspired his people to fight on. Taking 1,000 men, he launched an attack on the Roman forces. This maneuver allowed the remaining Lusitanians to escape to safety with orders to regroup at Tribola. Following this, Viriathus set an ambush in the valley of the Barbesula river. Vetilius. The Roman, unaware of the ambush, marched his army into the thicket of the. Viriathus and his forces launched a surprise attack from both sides, driving them over the cliffs and taking them prisoners. Vetilius himself was taken prisoner, but the man who captured him did not know who he was, and upon seeing that he was old and fat, killed him, believing him a worthless prisoner.

== Aftermath ==
Out of the 10,000 Roman soldiers, only 6,000 managed to escape to the nearby city of Carpessus (believed to be the ancient city of Tartessos). The surviving Roman soldiers were stationed on the walls of the town by the quaestor who accompanied Vetilius, badly demoralized. Having asked and obtained 5,000 allies from the Belli and Titthi, he sent them against Viriathus, who slew them all, so that there was not one left to tell the tale. After that the quaestor remained quietly in the town waiting for help from Rome.

== See also ==
- Viriathus
- Lusitanian War
