= Caucenus =

Lusitanian chief during the Lusitanian war

- Cauceno, Caucenus, Kaukainos
- Born: Lusitania
- Military career
- Allegiance: Lusitania
- Service years: 153 BC
- Conflicts: Lusitanian War

Caucenus (known as Cauceno in Portuguese and Spanish) was a chieftain of the Lusitanians, a proto-Celtic tribe from western Hispania. He was an important military figure during the earlier phase of the Lusitanian War.

== Biography ==
Caucenus commanded the Lusitanian tribes from the lands either north or south the Tajo river, He was apparently unaffiliated to Punicus and Caesarus, though probably inspired to act by their success against the Romans. Also, his campaign in Africa has suggested a possibly alliance with Carthage, at the time opposed to the Numidians of Masinissa, ally to Rome.

In 153 BC, Caucenus launched a military project of previously unseen ambition for his people. He and his contingent invaded the territory of the Cynetes, at the time Roman subjects, and captured their capital city, Conistorgis. They continued south and, after acquiring ships, crossed over the Gibraltar strait to invade the African region of Mauretania. There he divided his forces, the first part overrunning the nearby lands while the second besieged the city of Ocile, possibly current day Asilah, with the intent to capture it as well. However Lucius Mummius, fresh from his victory over Caesarus's troops, came to help the citizens with 9,500 soldiers. As the Lusitanians were unaware and engaged in the siege, they were quickly defeated, with 15,000 of them dying. He later fell in with another party who were carrying off booty, which he defeated as well before returning to Rome.

Appian records that around this time, one of Masinissa's sons engaged an Iberian army and was enveloped, forcing the king to come to his rescue. Due to the timing and place, it has been proposed that those Iberians were actually part of Caucenus' contingent. Either in collusion with Caucenus or out of opportunism, Carthage capitalized on the chance to sack Numidian lands and instigate revolt against Masinissa.

Later, in 151 BC, Lucius Licinius Lucullus would have to stop a similar though smaller Lusitanian invasion of Africa.

== Etymology ==
The origin of the name Caucenus is unknown, although it is thought to come from the Germanic root ke, meaning "to bend". This and variations like Caucinus and Cauceti were common in Celtiberia.

== See also ==
- Punicus
- Viriathus
