= Tautalus =

Lusitanian chief during the Lusitanian war

- Tautalus, Tantalus, Tautamus
- Born: Lusitania
- Military career
- Allegiance: Lusitania
- Service years: 139 BC
- Conflicts: Lusitanian War

Tautalus was a chieftain of the Lusitanians, a proto-Celtic tribe from western Hispania. He succeeded Viriathus in the final year of the Lusitanian War.

== Biography ==
Tautalus first emerged as a leader following the murder of Viriathus. His participation in the war was brief, and he was noted to lack Viriathus's tactical skills. Leading the remnants of Viriathus's army, Tautalus marched against the city of Saguntum in the Roman province of Hispania Citerior, but the siege was unsuccessfully. After being repelled by the defenders, Tautalus and his forces turned against Hispania Ulterior, going down the Betis river, where Quintus Servilius Caepio met them with a numerically superior army. Tautalus and the Lusitanians were defeated and forced to surrender their weapons. However, after signing a peace treaty with Tautalus, Caepio assigned them lands in order for them to cease their rebel activities. The Lusitanians were then settled by Decimus Junius Brutus in the colony of Valentia (possibly modern Valença do Minho or Valencia de Alcántara, if not the more geographically distant Valencia).

== Etymology ==
The name Tautalus, as transmitted by Appian, is believed to derive from the Celtic and Germanic root teu, meaning "people." However, there are some debate about whether Appian meant it to be Tautalus or Tantalus, as in the Hellenic name Tantalus. Similarly, Diodorus transmits the name as Tautamus or Tantamus.

== See also ==
- Viriathus
- Audax, Ditalcus and Minurus
- Lusitanian War
