= Quintus Fabius Maximus Servilianus =

2nd century BC Roman general and statesman

Quintus Fabius Maximus Servilianus was the adoptive son of Quintus Fabius Maximus Aemilianus and the natural son of Gnaeus Servilius Caepio (consul in 169 BC) - hence the adoptive cognomen Servilianus. He was consul of the Roman Republic in 142 BC together with Lucius Caecilius Metellus Calvus. He was the brother of Gnaeus Servilius Caepio (consul of 141 BC and censor in 125) and Quintus Servilius Caepio (consul in 140 BC). All three brothers were commanders in the Roman Province of Hispania Ulterior (Further Spain) and fought in the Lusitanian War.

Servilianus was born into the patrician gens Servilia before his adoption. His early career is unknown, but it is speculated that he would have been elected praetor by 145 BC.

Servilianus was also a priest and member of the College of Pontiffs. He wrote twelve books on sacred laws.

After his election as consul in 142 BC, Servilianus was sent to Hispania Ulterior and was given command of the Lusitanian War. He took with him two legions and a number of allied forces, totaling 18,000 infantry and 1,600 cavalry. He asked King Micipsa, the king of Numidia, for some elephants, and received ten elephants and 300 cavalry.

Servilianus fought against Viriathus, the leader of the Lusitanians. The story of this campaign was related by Appian. As he was marching on Uticca with his army formed into divisions, Viriathus attacked him with 6,000 troops, but was repulsed. When the rest of the army arrived, Servilianus built a large camp, then moved against Viriathus and defeated him. However, the pursuit was disorderly and Viriathus rallied, driving the Romans into their camp, killing 3,000 in the process, and then attacked the camp until nightfall. He made daily incursions until he forced Servilianus to return to Uticca. Viriathus ran short of supplies and returned to Lusitania. Servilianus did not pursue him. Instead, he plundered Baeturia and seized five towns which had sided with Viriathus. The chiefs of a gang of robbers, Curius and Apuleius, attacked the Romans with 10,000 men. This threw off the Romans and they seized some booty. Servilianus soon recovered the booty. He captured Escadia, Gemella, and Obolcola, which had been garrisoned by Viriathus. He plundered some cities, but spared others. He captured 10,000 prisoners, beheading 500 of them and selling the others into slavery. He received the surrender of Conoba, a "captain of robbers" and released him and his men, but cut off their hands. Frontinus wrote that he cut off the right hands of deserters. Orosius, whose work was biased, wrote that he "cut off the hands of five hundred Lusitanian chiefs who had been tempted by his offer of an alliance and had been received in accordance with the law of surrender." Servilianus then went to winter camps.

Servilianus then went after Viriathus. He besieged the city of Erisana, one of Viriathus' cities. Viriathus entered the town at night and at dawn he drove off the Romans who were working in the trenches. Servilianus lined up the rest of the army for battle, but was defeated and driven to some cliffs and pinned down. Viriathus took advantage of this to sue for peace on favourable terms. Servilianus agreed a treaty which allowed his followers to keep the territory they already possessed. This was ratified by the Roman senate and Viriathus was declared a friend of Rome.

The peace did not last long. Two years later his brother Quintus Servilius Caepio became consul and went to Hispania Ulterior. He was not happy with the peace and said that it was unworthy of the dignity of the Romans. He pressured the senate until he obtained the resumption of hostilities.

Later in his career Servilianus could have probably been censor before presumably murdering his son because of his lack of chastity; being prosecuted and forced into exile; although this episode is still being discussed, theorizing that Valerius Maximus made a mistake and was in fact talking about Quintus Fabius Maximus Eburnus, because Pompeius Strabo seems to have been the one prosecuting, a contemporary of the latter.

== Bibliography ==
- Appian, Roman History, Book 6, The Spanish Wars
- Broughton, T. Robert S., The Magistrates of the Roman Republic, Vol I (1951)
- Smith, William, Dictionary of Greek and Roman Biography and Mythology(1867)

Political offices
| Preceded by Appius Claudius Pulcher and Quintus Caecilius Metellus Macedonicus | Consul of the Roman Republic; 142 BC with Lucius Caecilius Metellus Calvus | Succeeded by Gnaeus Servilius Caepio and Quintus Pompeius |
