= Quintus Servilius Caepio (consul 140 BC) =

Roman statesman

Quintus Servilius Caepio was a Roman statesman. The son of Gnaeus Servilius Caepio, he served as consul in 140 BC alongside Gaius Laelius Sapiens. He was the father of Quintus Servilius Caepio (consul 106 BC).

After his consulship, Caepio was assigned to a proconsulship in Hispania Ulterior after the defeat of Quintus Fabius Maximus Servilianus at the hands of the Lusitanian chieftain Viriathus and the ratification of a treaty favourable to the latter. At the start of Caepio's tenure, he "pestered the senate with constant missives, urgently requesting permission to resume the war with Viriathus and disparaging Servilianus' dishonourable treaty". After getting permission to resume the war and with substantially more resources than Viriathus (who was running out of men), the chieftain opened negotiations, which were for naught: Caepio successfully bribed Viriathus' followers to assassinate him.

In the aftermath, some of the tribes in the region rallied around another leader, Tautalus, but were surrounded and peacefully resettled; Caepio also forced various tribes in the region to surrender and give up land to the Romans. He treated his soldiers so poorly that at one time he was almost killed by his own cavalry. His victory, however, was not complete: "other communities in western Spain were inspired by Viriathus' example and continued to raid the [Roman] provinces" in the coming years.

Preceded by Gnaeus Servilius Caepio and Quintus Pompeius	Consul of the Roman Republic; 140 BC; With: Gaius Laelius Sapiens	Succeeded by Gnaeius Calpurnius Piso and Marcus Popillius Laenas
