= Conistorgis =

Ancient city in pre-Roman Iberia

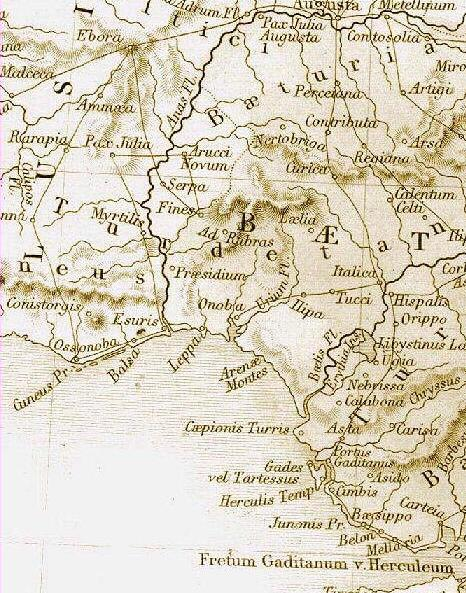
Map of the Gulf of Cadis in ancient times, showing part of the Roman provinces of Lusitania and Bætica. Conistorgis is imprecisely located north of Ossonoba (today's Faro, Portugal).

Conistorgis was the main city of the Conii or Cynetes. In the Conii language it probably meant "city of the Conii". The Celtici seem to have been present there.

== Location ==
Conistorgis was located somewhere in the interior of the Algarve, in southernmost Portugal, although the exact location is unknown.

Strabo places the land of the Conii between the river Anas and Hieron Akroterion (sacred promontory), with the latter being the most extreme point of the known world. He places Conistorgis in Celtic territory. In 1990, the most likely location was considered to be Baixo Alentejo or Algarve, northeast of Serra do Caldeirão.

Some attempts have been made to identify Conistorgis with later, Roman sites. One suggestion is that Conistorgis would have been located in Beja, one of the few Portuguese cities not to have a preroman name. This hypothesis would interpret the name Conistorgis as having a Celtic origin and meaning waterless (orgis) hill (conis) and that Julius Caesar would later rename Pax Julia. Another hypothesis is that Conistorgis would correspond to Medellín, Spain. None of these two suggestions are consensual among experts.

== History ==
The Conii had made an alliance with the Romans during the conquest of the Iberian Peninsula.

Appian mentions the city twice: once, between 155 and 152 BC, when the city is raided by the Lusitanians, led by Caucenus, during the Lusitanian War against Rome. The second time is when Servius Sulpicius Galba retreats into the city around 150 BC, after his first battle against the Lusitanians. Thus, the city was reconquered between 155 BC and 150 BC, probably by Marcus Atilius, when he fights against the Lusitanians and Vettones.

During the Sertorian War, Conistorgis is again attacked. The Sertorian forces attack the Roman forces garrisoned in Conistorgis.

== See also ==
- History of Portugal
