= Caesarus =

Lusitanian chief during the Lusitanian war

- Césaro, Caesarus, Kaisaros, Kaisaro
- Born: Lusitania
- Military career
- Allegiance: Lusitania
- Service years: 155-153 BC
- Conflicts: Lusitanian War

Caesarus (known as Césaro in Portuguese and Spanish) was a chieftain of the Lusitanians, a para-Celtic tribe from western Hispania. He followed and later replaced Punicus as their major military leader during the Lusitanian War.

== Biography ==
He is considered to have served as Punicus's lieutenant, which would explain the quick way he was promoted to leader after the latter's death. Caesarus might have previously accompanied him during his service as a mercenary for Phoenician or Punic territories in the south of the Iberian Peninsula. In 155 BC, Punicus provoked the Lusitanians and Vettones into revolting and pillaging the Roman colonies, but after being killed in 153 BC, he was relieved by Caesarus.

The new chieftain had his first major battle in Hispania Ulterior against the forces of Roman Praetor Lucius Mummius. Although the Roman forces were initially successful, obliging the Lusitanians to fall back and abandon their plunder, the Roman forces became disorganised in the chase, which Caesarus capitalised on to counter-attack. Mummius was defeated in the ensuing battle with as many as 9,000 of his men dying, allowing the Lusitanians to regain their spoils and also capture many of the Romans' weapons and standards. It has been speculated the whole sequence might have been a deliberate ruse by the Lusitanians. In any case, Caesarus then paraded mockingly with the Roman standards through the Iberian peninsula, helping to provoke the Second Celtiberian War.

Caesarus's forces faced Mummius again later, after the latter had remained in fortified positions training his army. This time Mummius won, recovering part of the lost plunder. Caesarus is not mentioned as being among the Lusitanians, making his ultimate fate unknown. Meanwhile, another Lusitanian contingent from adjacent lands had joined the war, led by the warlord Caucenus.

== Etymology ==
The meaning of the name Kaisaro is disputed, though it is believed it has a Phoenician root, bringing the possibility it was a title gained during his military experience in Phoenician or Punic territories. It might derive from the word ksr, related to the Carthaginian god Kusor, or alternatively from kysr, translating as "elephant" (the same origin as the Roman surname and title Caesar). Departing from the Phoenician thesis, it might come as well from the Celtic language, more specifically the words gaesi ("valiant man") or gaesum ("iron dart"), similar to the Celtic-Germanic name Caesorix.

== In film and television ==
The Spanish television series Hispania, La Leyenda (2010-2012) features Caesarus as the chief of Viriathus's home village. He is played by Lluís Marco.

== See also ==
- Viriathus
