= Baeturia, Spain =

Historical region in Spain

Turdetania in Iberia

Baeturia, Beturia, or Turdetania was an extensive ancient territory in the southern part of the Iberian Peninsula (in modern Spain) situated between the middle and lower courses of the Guadiana and the Guadalquivir rivers. From the Second Iron Age, it was inhabited by two distinct ethnic groups: the Celtici, who were Celtic Indo-Europeans in the west, and the Turduli, related to the Turdetani, in the east. The territory was annexed by Rome in the early 2nd century BC and became part of the province of Hispania Ulterior.

== History ==
In 27 B.C., Emperor Augustus reorganized the provincial boundaries, incorporating the entirety of Beturia into the senatorial province of Baetica. This integration involved different administrative-judicial dependencies: the Celtici area was affiliated with the juridical conventus of Hispalis (modern-day Seville), while the Turduli territory was governed from the conventus of Corduba (modern-day Córdoba).

According to research by Alicia M. Canto, initially proposed in 1991 and further detailed in 1995 and 1997, the division of the territory of Beturia between the Celtici and the Turduli was influenced by their respective mining expertise. The Celtici specialized in iron extraction, while the Turduli were skilled in the mining of silver and lead.

In Arab times both territories continued to exist in a distinctive form, the Celts survived in the kûra of Firrís, and the Turduli in that of Fahs al-Ballut (Canto, ERBC 1997, p. 46.)

In the present day, Celtic Beturia is primarily located in the southwest of the province of Badajoz and extends into Portugal as far as Serpa and the Guadiana River, which marked its ancient western boundary. A smaller portion lies in the north of the province of Huelva. The Beturia Association of Municipalities serves to commemorate this historical nomenclature. Meanwhile, Beturia Turdula encompasses the southeast of the province of Badajoz, the northern part of the province of Cordoba, and the southwest of the province of Ciudad Real.

== See also ==
- Turdetani
- Hispania Baetica
