= Servius Sulpicius Galba (consul 144 BC) =

Roman senator and general

Servius Sulpicius Galba was a consul of Rome in 144 BC.

== Macedonia ==
Galba served as tribune of the soldiers for part of the second legion in Macedonia, under Lucius Aemilius Paullus Macedonicus. After the conquest of Perseus in 167 BC, following Aemilius' return to Rome, Galba attempted to prevent his triumph. Galba did not succeed, but his efforts created notoriety.

== Hispania ==
Galba was a praetor in 151 BC. He was awarded Hispania (the Iberian Peninsula, including modern Spain and Portugal) as his province, where a war was being fought against the Celtiberians. When Galba arrived, he immediately confronted the Lusitanians. Galba successfully drove the enemy away, but he exhausted his undisciplined army and decided not to pursue the enemy. The Lusitanians turned around and a fierce battle ensued in which 7,000 Romans died. Galba then led the remnants of his army and his allies to his winter-quarters at Conistorgis.

In the spring of 150 BC, Galba again went to war against the Lusitanians. They soon sent an emissary to Galba, declaring they had made a mistake of making war against Roman subjects, and requested to return to a treaty they had made with Atilius.

He met with the Lusitanian emissaries and agreed that it had not been their fault in waging war against the Roman (and Galba's) provinces – they had no choice due to their poverty – so Galba suggested that the Lusitanians become allies of Rome and receive fertile land to colonise. Galba promised lands in different areas, so when the Lusitanians agreed to Galba's offer, they split into three factions to march to their destinations. When each arrived, they were attacked by Galba's forces and massacred.

Few Lusitanians escaped with their lives; but among the survivors was Viriathus, destined one day to avenge the wrong done to his countrymen.

Appian states that Galba, although wealthy, was miserly, and that he did not even lie or perjure himself, provided he could thereby gain pecuniary advantages.

In the following year, when Galba had returned to Rome, the tribune, Lucius Scribonius Libo, brought a charge against him for the outrage he had committed on the Lusitanians. Cato the Censor, then 85 years old, attacked him mercilessly in the assembly of the people. Galba, educated in the rhetoric of the day, had nothing to say in his own defence. Instead, Galba relied on bribery before bringing his children, and the orphan child of a relative, before the people. Imploring mercy, he was acquitted.

== Consul ==
Despite his atrocities, Galba was made consul in the year 144 BC, with Lucius Aurelius Cotta. The two consuls fought over who would take military command in a conflict against Viriathus in Hispania. They pulled the senate into factions and the resolution was that neither of them would go. The senate chose Quintus Fabius Maximus Aemilianus, the consul of the year before, to continue commanding the army in Hispania.

== See also ==
- Sulpicia gens

Political offices
| Preceded by Q. Fabius Maximus Aemilianus; L. Hostilius Mancinus | Roman consul 144 BC; With: Lucius Aurelius Cotta | Succeeded by Ap. Claudius Pulcher; Q. Caecilius Metellus Macedonicus |
