= Punicus =

Lusitanian chief during the Lusitanian war

- Púnico, Punicus
- Born: Lusitania
- Died: 153 BC
- Military career
- Allegiance: Lusitania
- Service years: 155–153 BC
- Conflicts: Lusitanian War

Punicus (known as Púnico in Portuguese and Spanish; died 153 BC) was a chieftain of the Lusitanians, a proto-Celtic tribe from western Hispania. He became their first military leader during the Lusitanian War, and also led their first major victories against Rome.

== Biography ==
Punicus's origin was placed by some authors in Herminius Mons (Serra da Estrela), like his later countryman Viriathus, but this has been doubted by others. Others place his origin in Braga, though it would make him one of the Bracari instead of a Lusitanian proper. It is probable that he served at some point as a mercenary in Phoenician or Punic territories in the south of the Iberian Peninsula, as Lusitanians and other Celtiberian tribes used to do. He might have taken part in the war between Carthage and the Numidians led by Masinissa, an ally to Rome.

In 155 BC, Punicus instigated a Lusitanian uprising and started sacking and pillaging through Roman territories. To crush the rebellion, Roman praetors Calpurnius Piso and proconsul Manius Manilius marched at the head of an army of 15,000 legionaries, but Punicus defeated them, inflicting losses of around 6000 men. This victory enabled Punicus to ally himself with the neighboring Vettones; he moved south and sacked the Mediterranean Roman provinces, including Hispania Baetica and the territories of the Blastophoenicians, a people vassal to Rome. His campaign also saw the death of Roman quaestor Terentius Varro. However, Punicus's leadership ended abruptly in 153 BC when he was killed by a throwing stone. He was replaced by his lieutenant Caesarus, who continued his campaign.

== Etymology ==
The word Punicus comes from ''Punic, a Latin word for "Phoenician" borrowed from Ancient Greek Phonikeos. It has been suggested that Punicus received this name not from birth, but as a title after gaining military experience around the still culturally Punic southern Hispania. Alternatively, it is also possible that he was a Phoenician by blood, a Lusitanian of Phoenician ancestry, or merely a Hispanic whose name sounded like Punicus to Roman chroniclers.

An 18th-century chronicle gives Punicus the alternate name of "Appimanus".

== See also ==
- Caesarus
- Viriathus
- Olyndicus
