= Cynetes =

Pre-Roman people of the Iberian Peninsula

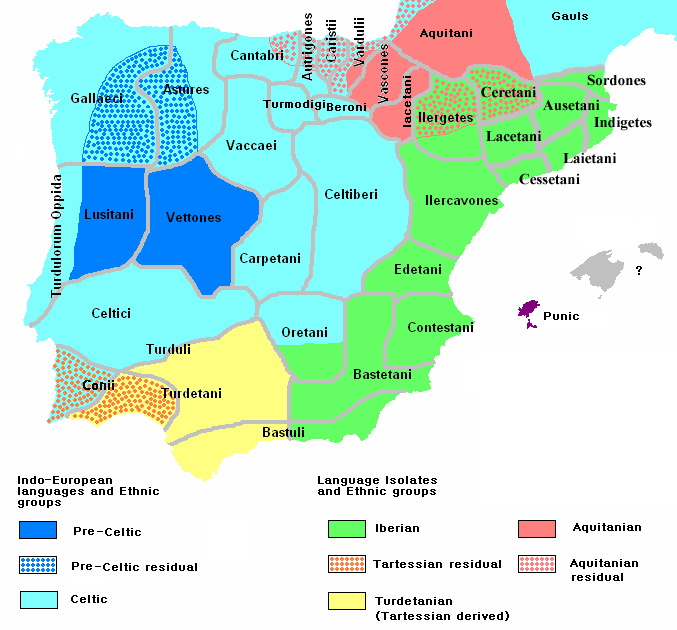
Iberian Peninsula at about 200 BCE

Main language areas in Iberia c. 300 BC

The Cynetes, Cynesians or Conii were one of the pre-Roman peoples of the Iberian Peninsula, living in today's Algarve and Lower Alentejo regions of southern Portugal, and the southern part of Badajoz and the northwestern portions of Córdoba and Ciudad Real provinces in Spain before the 6th century BC (in what part of this become the southern part of the Roman province of Lusitania). According to Justin's epitome, the mythical Gargoris and Habis were their founding kings.

== Etymology ==
The name Cynetes (Latin Conii) probably stems from Proto-Celtic *kwon ('dog') connected with Greek kyοn, κύων, dog.

== Origins and location ==
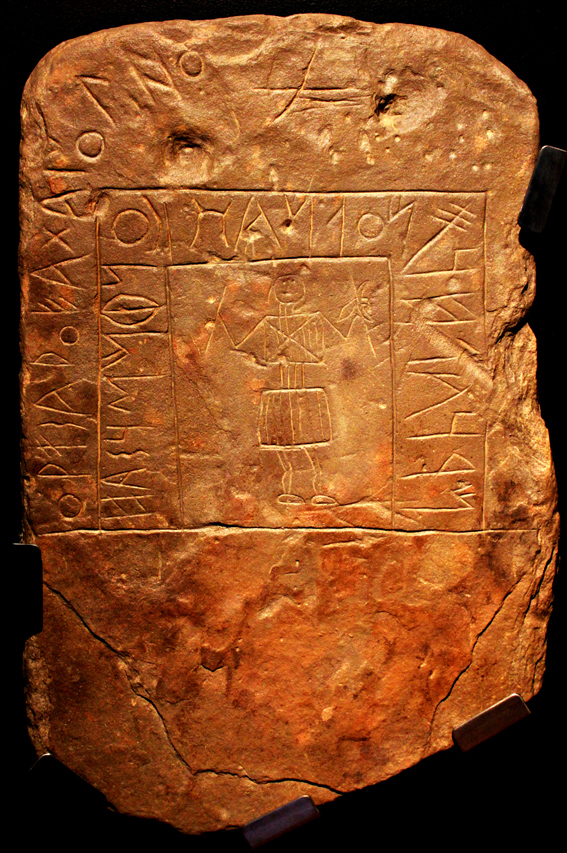
Conii script, 8th century BC

They are often mentioned in the ancient sources under various designations, mostly Greek or Latin derivatives of their two tribal names: ‘Cynetas’/’Cynetum’; ‘Kunetes’, ‘Kunetas’, and ‘Kunesioi' or ‘Cuneus’, followed by ‘Konioi’, ‘Kouneon’ and ‘Kouneous’/‘Kouneoi’. The Conii occupied since the late Bronze Age most of the present-day Lower Alentejo, Algarve, the southern part of Badajoz and the northwestern portions of Córdoba and Ciudad Real provinces, giving the Algarve its pre-Roman name, the Cyneticum. Prior to the Celtic-Turduli migrations of the 5th to 4th centuries BC, the original Conii territories also included upper Alentejo and the Portuguese coastal Estremadura region stretching up to the Munda (Mondego) river valley.

== Genetics ==
It has been suggested that the haplotypes HLA-A25-B18-DR15 and HLA-A26-B38-DR13, which are unique genetic markers found in Portugal, may be from the Conii (or Oestrimni).

== Culture ==
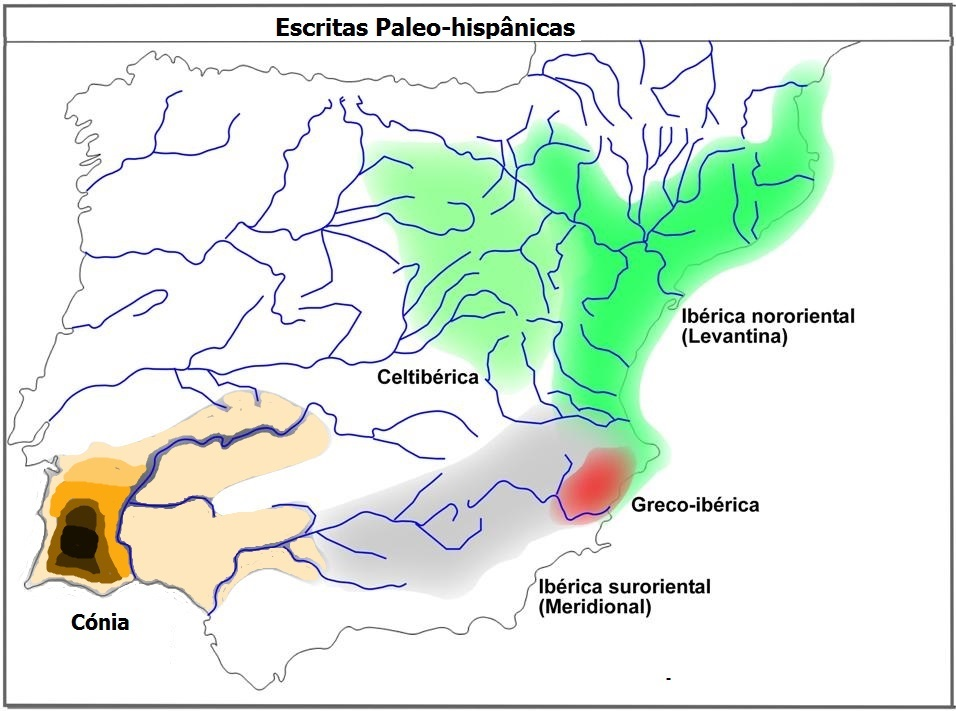
Conii area and Paleohispanic neighbours

Their presence in these regions is attested archeologically by the elaborated cremation burial-mounds of their ruling elite, whose rich grave-goods and the inscribed slabs in ‘Tartessian alphabet’ – also referred to as ‘Southwest script’ – that mark the graves, evidence contact with North Africa and the eastern Mediterranean since the 9th century BC. Scholars like Schulten, consider the Conii a Ligurian tribe (related to the Ligures of North-western Italy/South-eastern France) and believe that the «Ligurians are the original people of the Iberian Peninsula». The Conii would have left their mark not only in Portugal but also in Spain and European regions where the Ligurians established themselves. They appear to be related to the Aquitanians and the Basques.

Inscriptions in the Tartessian language have been found in the area, in a variety often referred to as Southwest Paleohispanic script. The name Conii, found in Strabo, seems to have been identical with the Cynesii, who were mentioned by Herodotus as the westernmost dwellers of Europe and distinguished by him from the Celts.

== Towns ==
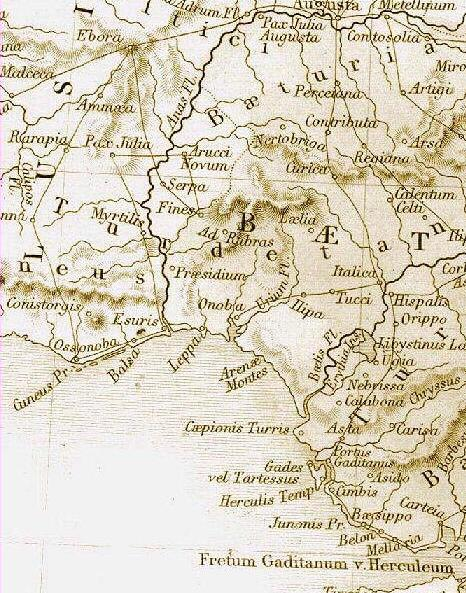
Map of the Gulf of Cádiz in Antiquity. Conistorgis is imprecisely located north of Ossonoba city (today's Faro, Portugal).

The capital of the Conii was Conistorgis, according to Strabo, who considered the region Celtic. In the local language Conistorgis probably means "City of the Conii". Its precise location has not been determined. Some authors suggest that Pax Julia might have been founded over the ruins of Conistorgis.

Other Conii towns (Oppida) included Ipses (Alvor), Cilpe (Cerro da Rocha Branca – Silves), Ossonoba (near Faro; Iberian-type mint: Osunba), Balsa (Quinta da Torre de Aires, Santa Luzia – Tavira), Baesuris (Castro Marim; Iberian-type mint: Baesuri) and Myrtilis (Mértola; Iberian-type mint: Mrtlis Saidie). According to Pomponius Mela the population of these parva oppida did not surpass the 6,000 inhabitants.

A powerful urban aristocracy of Phoenician and Turdetanian or Turduli colonists dominated all the trade, fishing, and shipbuilding in these same coastal settlements since the 4th century BC, until the Carthaginians occupied the Cyneticum and founded the Punic colonies of Portus Hannibalis (near Portimão?) and Portus Magonis (Portimão) at the late 3rd century BC.

== History ==
Votive offering made of copper alloy representing a bull (5th or 4th centuries BC), believed to be of Conii origin. It was discovered in Ferragudo.

The Conii seemed to have played no significant role in the Second Punic War and subsequent conflicts, even though they were constantly under the pressure from the northernly Celtic tribes throughout the 3rd to 2nd centuries BC, which may explain their willingness to place themselves under the protection of foreign powers such as Carthage and later Rome.

Around the 3rd century BC, the Celtici reached the western Algarve, establishing a colony at Laccobriga (Monte Molião, near Lagos) and in 153 BC, during the Lusitanian Wars against Rome, Conistorgis fell to the Lusitani and their Vettones' allies. The Conii were thence forced to switch their allegiance from the Roman Republic to the Lusitani, being subjected in 141-140 BC to Consul Quintus Fabius Maximus Servilianus’ reprisal campaigns in the Iberian southwest.

In 138-137 BC the Cyneticum was aggregated into Hispania Ulterior province, only to become again a battleground during the Sertorian Wars, when Quintus Sertorius seized Conistorgis and Consul Quintus Caecilius Metellus Pius devastated the region in retaliation.

=== Romanization ===
In 27-13 BC the romanized Conii were incorporated by Emperor Augustus into his new Lusitania province.

== See also ==
- Bardili (Turduli)
- Celtici
- Conistorgis
- Cyneticum
- History of Portugal
- Prehistoric Iberia
- Timeline of Portuguese history
- Turduli
- Pre-Roman peoples of the Iberian Peninsula
- Sefes
- Sertorian Wars
- Southwest Paleohispanic script
- "Tartessian" language (Southwestern or "South-Lusitanian" language)
