= Viriathus =

Lusitanian leader and rebel (d. 139 BCE)

- Viriato, Viriatus
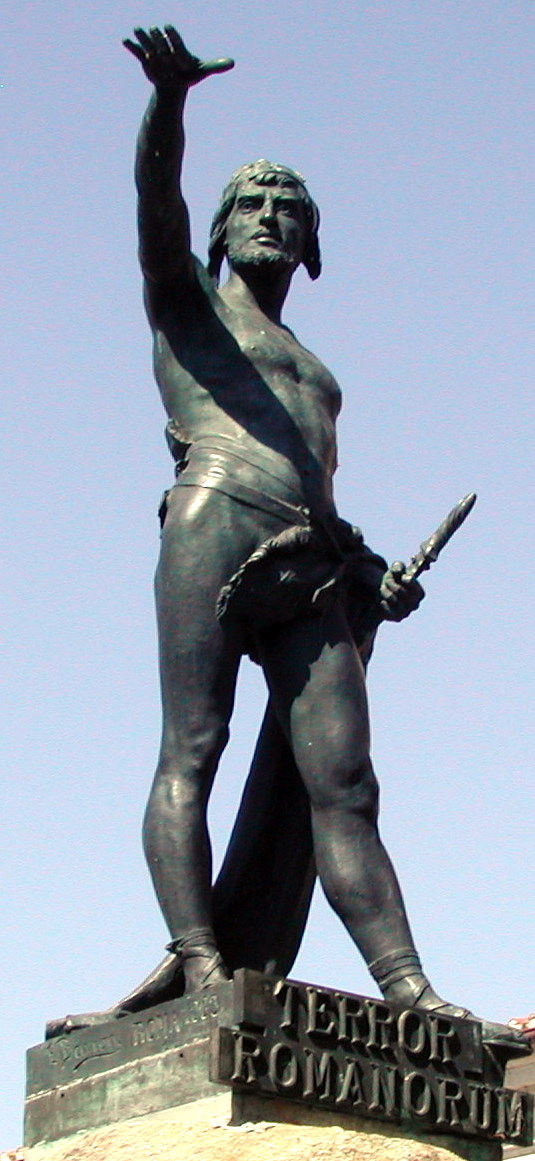
- Statue in Zamora
- Born: Lusitania
- Died: 139 BC
- Military career
- Allegiance: Lusitania
- Service years: 147 BC – 139 BC
- Conflicts: Lusitanian War; Battle of Tribola; Raid of Carpetania
- Memorials: Statue of Viriato, at Zamora, Spain Statue of Viriato, at Viseu, Portugal

Viriathus (also spelled Viriatus; known as Viriato in Portuguese and Spanish; died 139 BC) was the most important leader of the Lusitanian people that resisted Roman expansion into Lusitania (modern Portugal). (Note: This Roman province spread over areas comprising most of Portugal (the northernmost part was included in Gallaecia), all of Extremadura and the province of Salamanca. "...the most of the Lusitanians are called Callaicans.")

Viriathus developed alliances with other Celtic groups, even far away from his usual theatres of war, inducing them to rebel against Rome. He led his army, supported by most of the Lusitanian and Vetton tribes as well as by other Celtic and Iberian allies, to several victories over the Romans between 147 BC and 139 BC before being betrayed by them and murdered while sleeping. Theodor Mommsen said of him: "It seemed as if, in that thoroughly prosaic age, one of the Homeric heroes had reappeared."

== Etymology ==
There are several possible etymologies for the name Viriathus. The name can be composed of two elements: Viri and Athus. Viri may come from:

- the Indo-European root *uiros, "man", relating to strength and virility;
- the Celtic *uiro- 'man'; and the older forms viros, viri, viro, viron from which derived the Old Irish word for man, fir;
- from *uei-, as in the viriae or Celtiberian "twisted armbands" used by warriors (Pliny XXIII, 39);
- the Latin viri (pronounced "wee-ree", coming from the Indo-European root above) meaning man, hero, person of courage, honor, and nobility.
- It is cognate to the Welsh name Gwriad and possibly to the Irish name Ferdiad.

The Celtic elite used the title uiros ueramos, meaning the 'highest man' and the Latin equivalent would be summus vir.

According to the historian Schulten, Viriathus had a Celtic name.

== Viriathus's life ==
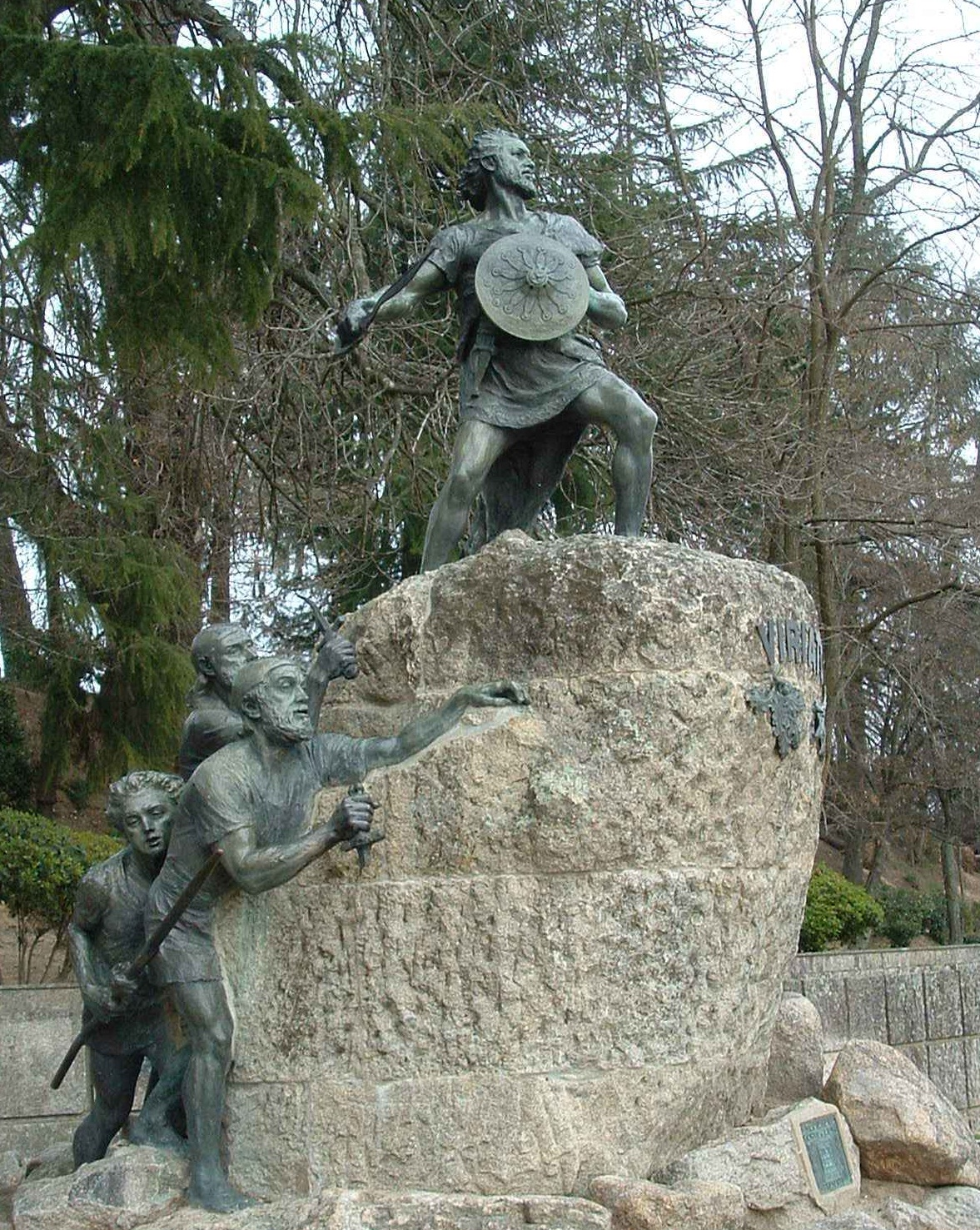
Statue of Viriathus in Viseu, Portugal

For he was, as is agreed by all, valiant in dangers, prudent and careful in providing whatever was necessary, and that which was most considerable of all was, that whilst he commanded he was more beloved than ever any was before him.

— Diodorus Siculus

Little is known about Viriathus. The only reference to the location of his native tribe was made by the Greek historian Diodorus Siculus, who claims he was from the Lusitanian tribes of the ocean side.

He belonged to the class of warriors, the occupation of the minority ruling elites. He was known to the Romans as the dux of the Lusitanian army, as the adsertor (protector) of Lusitania, or as an imperator, probably of the confederated Lusitanian and Celtiberian tribes.

Livy described him as a shepherd who became a hunter, then a soldier, thus following the path of most young warriors, the iuventus, who devoted themselves to cattle raiding, hunting and war.

According to Appian, Viriathus was one of the few who escaped when Galba, the Roman governor, massacred the flos iuventutis, the flower of the young Lusitanian warriors, in 150 BC.

Two years after the massacre, in 148 BC, Viriathus became the leader of a Lusitanian army.

Viriathus was thought by some to have a very obscure origin, although Diodorus Siculus also says that Viriathus "approved himself to be a prince" and that he said he was "lord and owner of all". His family was unknown to the Romans who were familiar with the native aristocratic warrior society. His personality and his physical and intellectual abilities as well as his skills as a warrior were described by several authors. He was a man of great physical strength, probably in the very prime of life, an excellent strategist, and possessor of a brilliant mind. Some authors claim that the ancient authors described Viriathus with the precise features of a Celtic king.

He was described as a man who followed the principles of honesty and fair dealing and was acknowledged for being exact and faithful to his word on the treaties and alliances he made. Livy gives him the title of vir duxque magnus with the implied qualities that were nothing more than the ideals of the ancient virtues.

A more modern current claims Viriathus belonged to an aristocratic Lusitanian clan who were owners of cattle. For Cassius Dio, he did not pursue power or wealth, but carried on the war for the sake of military glory. His aims could then be compared to pure Roman aristocratic ideals of that time: to serve and gain military glory and honor. Viriathus did not fight for war spoils or material gain, like common soldiers.

The Lusitanians honored Viriathus as their Benefactor, (Greek: euergetes), and Savior (Greek: soter), typically Hellenistic honorifics used by kings like the Ptolemies.

Some authors assert that he was probably from the Herminius Mons (Serra da Estrela), in the heart of Lusitania, (in central Portugal) or the Beira Alta region.

Most of his life and his war against the Romans are part of legend and Viriathus is considered the earliest Portuguese national hero, given the fact that he was the leader of the confederate tribes of Iberia who resisted Rome. The historian Appianus of Alexandria in his book about Iberia (in the section Historia Romana, Roman History), commented that Viriathus "killed numerous Romans and showed great skill".

=== Viriathus of Silius Italicus ===
It has been argued that Silius Italicus, in his epic poem entitled Punica, mentions a former Viriathus who would have been a contemporary of Hannibal. He is referenced as primo Viriatus in aeuo, and was a leader of the Gallaeci and of the Lusitanians.

The historical Viriathus would be the one who received the title of regnator Hiberae magnanimus terrae, the "magnanimous ruler of the Iberian land".

== Conquest of Lusitania by Rome ==
Map of Viriathus's campaigns in the Iberian Peninsula

In the 3rd century BC, Rome started its conquest of the Iberian Peninsula. The Roman conquest of Iberia began during the Second Punic War, when the senate sent an army to Iberia to block Carthaginian reinforcements from helping Hannibal in the Italian Peninsula. This began Roman involvement in 250 years of subsequent fighting throughout Iberia, resulting in its eventual conquest in 19 BC with the end of the Cantabrian Wars. The Lusitanian War is one of the most well documented episodes of the conquest.

Rome's dominion of Iberia met with much opposition. In 197 BC, Rome divided the southeastern coast of Iberia into two provinces, Hispania Citerior and Hispania Ulterior, and two elected praetors were assigned to command the legions. As with many other tribes of Iberia, the inhabitants of the Lusitanian castros, or citanias, would have been granted peregrina stipendiaria but remaining an autonomous (Greek: αὐτονόμων) country through treaties (foedus).

Lusitania's rich land was praised by ancient authors. Polybius in his Histories, "speaking of the natural wealth of Lusitania [...], tells us that owing to the favorable climate both men and animals are very prolific, and the land is constantly productive."

The Romans charged the native tribes with heavy taxes: a fixed vectigal or land-tax, the tributum and a certain quantity of cereals. Taxes were not the only source of income; mine exploitation and peace treaties were a source of denarius as well as war spoils and war prisoners who were sold as slaves. The indigenous towns had to deliver their own treasures to the Romans, which left them only with their yearly earnings to pay the taxes. In 174 BC, when Publius Furius Philus was accused of paying very little for the cereals that Iberia was compelled to deliver to Rome, Cato defended the interests of the native tribes. The exploitation and extortion reached such an extreme degree in the provinces that Rome had to create a special tribunal and laws, like the Lex Calpurnia created in 149 BC.

=== Revolts ===
The Lusitanians revolted first in 194 BC against the Romans. Iberia was divided between the tribes that supported Roman rule and the tribes that revolted against Roman rule, as they had been divided before by those who supported the Carthaginian and those who supported Romans.

This period was marked by a number of broken treaties either by the Roman generals, or their senate, that would not ratify the treaties, or by the native people.

In 152 BC the Lusitanians made a peace agreement with Marcus Atilius, after he conquered Oxthracae, Lusitania's biggest city. In Roman law, peregrini dediticii was the designation given to peoples who had surrendered themselves after taking up arms against the Romans. The terms offered were such that, as soon as Atilius returned to Rome, they rebelled and broke the treaty. Then they attacked the tribes that were Roman subjects and that had sided with the Romans in helping to attack and plunder the Lusitanian towns. Possibly the Lusitanians recovered some of the booty the Romans had divided with those tribes.

In 151 BC the Celtiberians who had become Roman allies, fearing the revenge of the rebels who considered them traitors, asked the Romans to punish the rebellious tribes who had broken out into war and that the legions should remain in Iberia to protect them.

==== Massacre of the Lusitanians ====
The praetor of Hispania Ulterior, Servius Sulpicius Galba commanded the Roman troops in Iberian Peninsula c.150 BC, and at the same time Lucius Licinius Lucullus was appointed Governor of the Hispania Citerior and commander of an army. In the year 151 BC, Lucullus "being greedy of fame and needing money", made a peace treaty with the Caucaei, of the Vaccaei tribe, after which he ordered his men to kill all the tribe's adult males, of which it is said only a few out of 30,000 escaped.

Servius Sulpicius Galba joined forces with Lucius Licinius Lucullus and together started to depopulate Lusitania. While Lucullus invaded the country from the east, Galba attacked it from the south. Unable to sustain a war on two fronts, the Lusitanian troops suffered several losses in engagements with the Romans. Fearing a long siege and the destruction the Roman siege engines would cause in their towns, the Lusitanians sent an embassy to Galba to negotiate a peace treaty, although for the Romans it would be perceived as the Deditio in dicionem, the surrender. The Lusitanians hoped they could at least renew the former treaty made with Atilius. Galba received the Lusitanian embassy politely, and a peace treaty was agreed on the terms proposed by him. He commanded them to leave their homes and remain in open country. The Lusitanians probably lost their city and possessions and their land would have become Ager Publicus. The conquest of a territory, unless it had been given special conditions, could imply the acquisition, by the Romans, of the conquered territory and all that it contained.

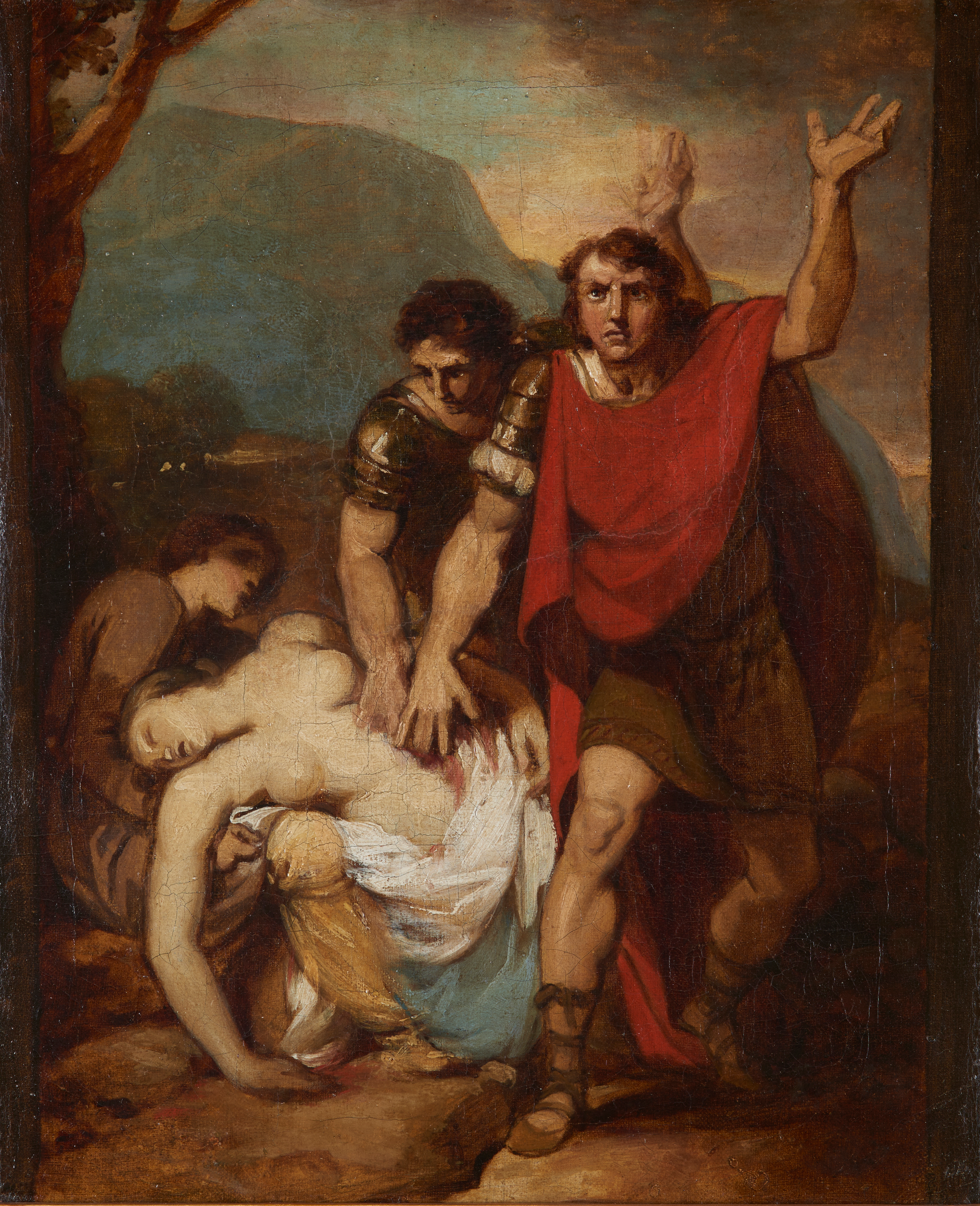
The Oath of Viriathus, c. 1799, Vieira Portuense

The treaty turned out to be a trap, like the one Lucullus had prepared for the Caucaei. When the unarmed Lusitanians, among them Viriathus, were gathered together by Galba to hand over their weapons and to be split into three groups (two of the points of the treaty that had been negotiated) and allocated to new lands, the trap was sprung. With the promise that they would be given new lands they waited unaware while Galba's army surrounded them with a ditch, to prevent them from escaping. Afterwards, Roman soldiers were sent in and began to massacre all the males of military age. The survivors are said to have been sold into slavery in Gaul.

The relocation of an entire tribe, accompanied by slaughter or their reduction to the status of slaves was a punishment often inflicted on native populations who took part in revolts.

Galba distributed a little of the plunder to the army and a little to his friends, the native tribes that sided with him, and kept the rest. This incited a massive rebellion, with the entire Lusitanian tribe mustering as they waged war for three years against Rome, but met with many failures.

Three years after the massacre, the rebellion was on the verge of defeat when Viriathus appeared and offered himself as leader. Through his understanding of Roman military methods he saved the rebel Lusitanians by a simple though clever escape plan. Viriathus became the leader of the Lusitanians and caused much grief to the Romans in revenge for the massacre of his people.

== The "War of Fire" ==
And, in fine, he carried on the war not for the sake of personal gain or power nor through anger, but for the sake of warlike deeds in themselves; hence he was accounted at once a lover of war and a master of war. ~ Cassius Dio

The war with Viriathus was called "War of Fire" by the Greek historian Polybius of Megalopolis. Two types of war were carried on by Viriathus, bellum ('war'), when he used a regular army, and latrocinium, when the fighting involved small groups of combatants and the use of guerrilla tactics. For many authors Viriathus is the model of the guerrilla fighter.

Nothing is known about Viriathus until his first feat of war in 149 BC. He was with an army of ten thousand men that invaded southern Turdetania.

Rome sent the praetor Caius Vetilius to fight the rebellion. He attacked a group of Lusitanian warriors who were out foraging, and after several of them were killed, the survivors took refuge in a place that was surrounded by the Roman army. They were about to make a new agreement with the Romans when Viriathus, mistrusting the Romans, proposed an escape plan. The Lusitanians, inflamed by his speech, made him their new commander. His first act was to rescue the trapped and resisting Lusitanians whom he then commanded, first by lining up for battle with the Romans, then scattering the army as they charged. As each wave broke apart and fled in different directions to meet up at a later location, Viriathus with 1,000 chosen men held the army of 10,000 Romans in check by being in a position to attack. Once the rest of the army had fled, he and the thousand men escaped as well. Having effectively saved all of the Lusitanians soldiers, he immediately fortified the loyalty of the people around himself.

Viriathus organized an attack against Caius Vetilius in Tribola. Since the Romans were better armed, he organized guerrilla tactics and sprang imaginative ambushes. Charging with iron spears, tridents and roars, the Lusitanians defeated Vetilius, killing 4,000 out of 10,000 soldiers, including Vetilius himself. In response, Celtiberians were hired to attack the Lusitanians, but were destroyed. After that incident, the Lusitanians clashed with the armies of Gaius Plautius, Claudius Unimanus and Gaius Negidius, all of whom were defeated. During this period Viriathus inspired and convinced the Numantine and some Gauls to rebel against Roman rule.

To complete the subjugation of Lusitania, Rome sent Quintus Fabius Maximus Aemilianus, with 15,000 soldiers and 2,000 cavalry to strengthen Gaius Laelius Sapiens who was a personal friend of Scipio Aemilianus Africanus. Despite accomplishing the retreat of the Lusitanians in an initial victory, Aemilianus returned to Rome without having taken down Viriathus, and the Romans lost most of his reinforcements in Ossuma and Beja in Alentejo. This gave the Lusitanians access to what is today's Spanish territory, modern Granada and Murcia. The results of Viriathus's efforts as well as those of the Numantine War caused many problems in Rome, the most notable being a drop in legionary recruitment rates.

Learning of these events, Rome sent one of its best generals, Quintus Fabius Maximus Servilianus, to Iberia. Near Sierra Morena, the Romans fell into a Lusitanian ambush. Viriathus did not harm the Romans and let the soldiers and Servilianus go in exchange for a peace treaty that recognised Lusitanian rule over the land they dominated. This agreement was ratified by the Roman Senate and Viriathus was declared "amicus populi Romani", (Greek: Rhômaiôn philos), an ally of the Roman people.

However, the peace brought by the treaty displeased Quintus Servilius Caepio, who got himself appointed successor to his brother, Q. Fabius Maximus Servilianus, in the command of the army and administration of affairs in Iberia. In his reports to the Roman Senate he claimed that the treaty was in the highest degree dishonourable to Rome. Livy seemed to have a different opinion as he writes it was a stain on Servilianus's military career but comments that the treaty was, aequis, fair. The senate authorised Q. Servilius Caepio, on his request, to harass Viriathus as long as it was done secretly. The treaty was in effect for one year. During that time Q. Servilius Caepio harassed Viriathus and kept pressuring with his reports until he was authorised publicly to declare war.

== Death ==
Knowing that the Lusitanian resistance was largely due to Viriathus's leadership, Caepio bribed Audax, Ditalcus and Minurus, who had been sent by Viriathus as an embassy to establish peace (Appian). These ambassadors returned to their camp and killed Viriathus while he was sleeping. Eutropius claims that when Viriathus's assassins asked Quintus Servilius Caepio for their payment he answered that "it was never pleasing to the Romans, that a general should be killed by his own soldiers." Or, in a version more common in modern Portugal and Spain, that "Rome does not pay traitors". Quintus Servilius Caepio was refused his Triumph by the Senate.

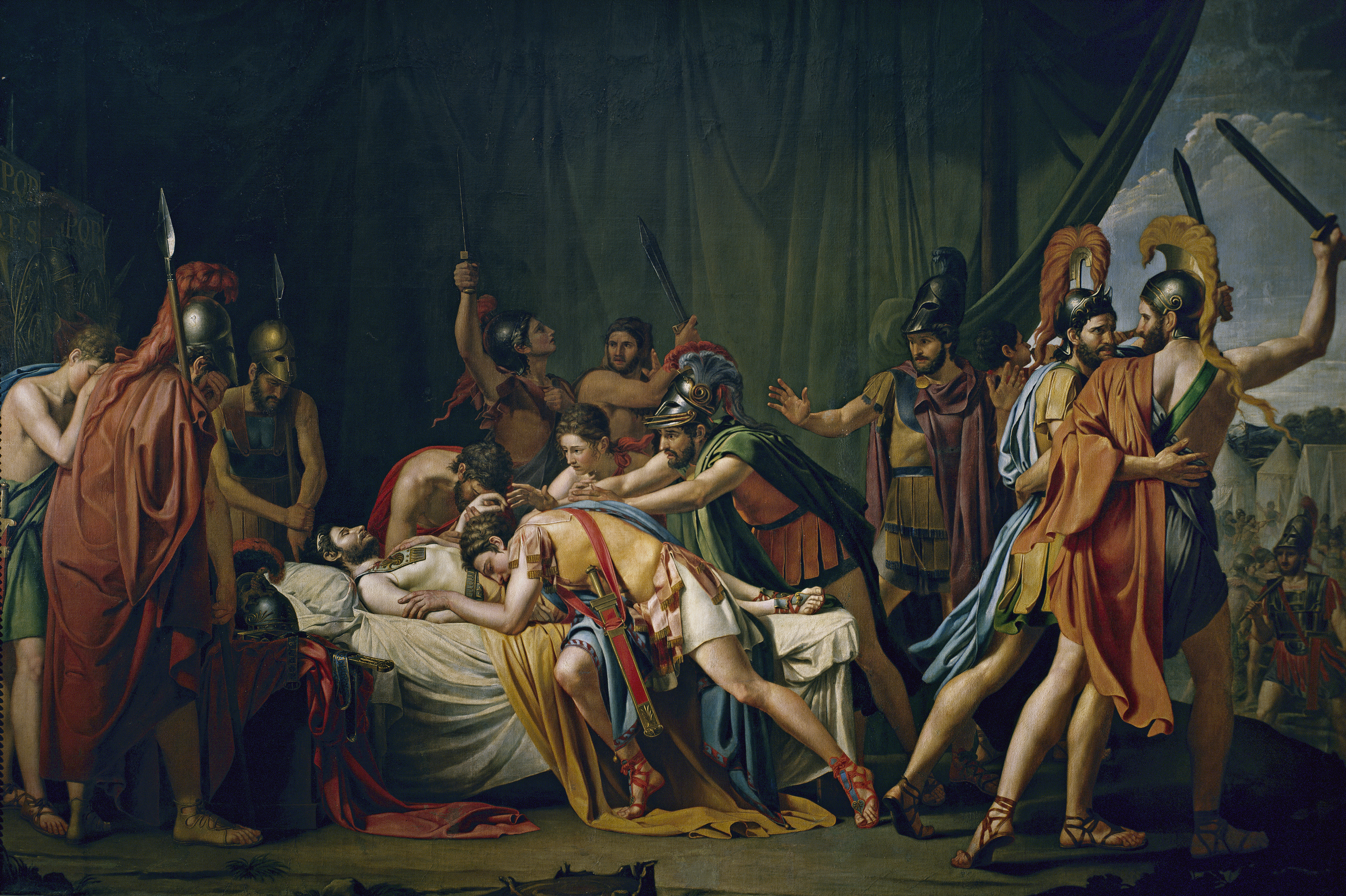
José de Madrazo's painting of the death of Viriathus.

After the death of Viriathus, the Lusitanians kept fighting under the leadership of Tautalus (Greek: Τάυταλος).

Laenas would finally give the Lusitanians the land they originally had asked for before the massacre. Nevertheless, total pacification of Lusitania was only achieved under Augustus. Under Roman rule, Lusitania and its people gradually acquired Roman culture and language.

Viriathus stands as the most successful leader who ever opposed the Roman conquest in Iberia. During the course of his campaigns he was only defeated in battle against the Romans once, and from a military standpoint can be said to have been one of the most successful generals to have ever opposed Rome's expansion. Ultimately, even the Romans recognized that it was more prudent to use treachery rather than open confrontation to defeat the Lusitanian uprising. Some fifty years later, the renegade Roman general Quintus Sertorius, at the head of another insurrection in Iberia, would meet a similar fate.

== Legacy ==
Viriathus became an enduring symbol of Portuguese nationality and independence, portrayed by artists and celebrated by its people throughout the centuries. In his epic poem Os Lusíadas, Luís Vaz de Camões exalts Viriathus's great deeds.

The flag of the Spanish province of Zamora, called la seña bermeja, has eight red stripes, which traditionally have been associated to the eight victories of Viriathus over the Romans. The historical authenticity of this origin is disputed.

There is a street in Madrid named after him, in Chamberí neighborhood (near the metro station 'Iglesia'). The same is true of Lisbon, Zamora and many other towns in Spain and Portugal.

The planet HD 45652 b was named Viriato in 2019 after Viriathus.

Asterix in Lusitania makes multiple references to Viriathus, known in Portuguese as Viriato, as a shepherd turned military leader resisting Roman incursion during the Lusitanian Wars.

=== Film and television ===
- In the Portuguese film No, or the Vain Glory of Command (1990), directed by Manoel de Oliveira, that depicts, episodes from the military history of Portugal, are told by a Portuguese lieutenant to his man, during the Portuguese Colonial War (1961–1974). Luís Miguel Cintra played the part of Viriathus.
- The Spanish television series Hispania, la leyenda (2010–2012) is loosely based on his life and exploits. He was played by Roberto Enríquez.
- The History Channel's "Barbarians Rising" (2016) features the story of Viriathus in its first episode entitled "Resistance". Jefferson Hall played Viriathus.

== See also ==
- Ambiorix
- Alaric I
- Ardaric
- Arminius
- Autaritus
- Battle of Baduhenna Wood
- Bato (Daesitiate chieftain)
- Boudica
- Fritigern
- Gainas
- Gaius Julius Civilis
- John of Gothia
- Spartacus
- Totila
- Tribigild
- Vercingetorix
