= First Celtiberian War =

181–179 BC anti-Roman revolt in Hispania

1st Celtiberian War
- Part of Celtiberian Wars
Date	181 to 179 BC
Location	Hispania
Result	Roman victory
Territorial changes	Rome submits certain tribes, but allows them to keep autonomy.

Belligerents
Roman Republic	Celtiberian tribes, Vaccaei and possibly Vettones

Commanders and leaders
Quintus Fulvius Flaccus, Tiberius Sempronius Gracchus	Unknown

The First Celtiberian War (181–179 BC) was the first of three major rebellions by the Celtiberians against the Roman presence in Hispania. The other two were the Second Celtiberian War (154–151 BC) and the Numantine War (143–133 BC). Hispania was the name the Romans gave to the Iberian Peninsula. The peninsula was inhabited by various ethnic groups and numerous tribes. The Celtiberians were a confederation of five tribes, which lived in a large area of east central Hispania, to the west of Hispania Citerior. The eastern part of their territory shared a stretch of the border of this Roman province. The Celtiberian tribes were the Pellendones, the Arevaci, the Lusones, the Titti and the Belli.

The Romans took over the territories of the Carthaginians in southern Hispania when they defeated them at the Battle of Ilipa in 206 BC during the Second Punic War (218–201 BC). After the war they remained and in 197 BC they established two Roman colonies: Hispania Citerior (Nearer Spain) along most of the east coast, an area roughly corresponding to the modern autonomous communities of Aragon, Catalonia and Valencia, and Hispania Ulterior (Further Spain) in the south, roughly corresponding to modern Andalusia. There were numerous rebellions by many tribes of Hispania, including tribes both inside and outside Roman territory, in most years for a period of 98 years, until the end of the First Celtiberian War in 179 BC. For details of these rebellions see the Roman conquest of Hispania article.

== The First Celtiberian War (181–179 BC) ==
=== The siege of Aebura (Carpetania) (181 BC) ===
The praetors Publius Manlius and Quintus Fulvius Flaccus were given military command for Hispania Ulterior and Citerior respectively in 182 BC and this was extended to 181 BC. They received reinforcements of 3,000 Roman and 6,000 allied infantry and 200 Roman and 300 allied cavalry. The Celtiberians gathered 35,000 men. Livy wrote: ‘hardly ever before had they raised so large a force’. Quintus Fulvius Flaccus drew as many auxiliary troops from the friendly tribes as he could, but his numbers were inferior. He went to Carpetania (in south central Hispania, to the south Celtiberia) and encamped near Aebura (Talavera de la Reina, in western part of the modern province of Toledo; it was at the edge of the territory of the Vettones). He sent a small detachment to occupy the town. A few days later the Celtiberians encamped at the foot of a hill two miles from the Romans. The praetor sent his brother, Marcus Fulvius, with two squadrons of native cavalry for reconnaissance with instructions to get as close to the enemy rampart as possible to get an idea of the size of the camp. If enemy's cavalry spotted him he was to withdraw. For a few days nothing happened. Then the Celtiberian army drew up midway between the two camps, but the Romans did not respond. For four days, this continued. After this both sides withdrew to their camps. Both cavalries went out on patrol and collected wood at the rear of their camps without interfering with each other.

When the praetor thought that the enemy would not expect action, he sent Lucius Acilius to go around the hill behind the enemy camp with a contingent of troops of Latin allies and 6,000 native auxiliaries with orders to assault the camp. They marched at night to elude detection. At dawn Lucius Acilius sent Gaius Scribonius, the commander of the allies, to the enemy rampart with his cavalry. When the Celtiberians saw them they sent out their cavalry and signaled their infantry to advance. Gaius Scribonius turned round and made for the Roman camp as per instructions. When Quintus Fulvius Flaccus thought that the Celtiberians were sufficiently drawn away from their camp he advanced with his army, which had been drawn up in three separate corps behind the rampart. Meanwhile, the cavalry on the hill charged down, as instructed, on the enemy camp, which had no more than 5,000 guarding it. The camp was taken with little resistance. Acilius set fire to that part of it which could be seen from the battlefield. Word spread through the Celtiberian line that the camp was lost, throwing them into indecision. They then resumed the fight, as it was their only hope. The Celtiberian centre was hard pressed by the Fifth Legion. However, they advanced against the Roman left flank, which had native auxiliaries, and would have overrun it had the Seventh Legion not come to its aid. The troops which were at Aebura turned up and, as Acilius was at the enemy's rear, the Celtiberians were sandwiched and cut to pieces; 23,000 died and 4,700 were captured. On the other side, 200 Romans, 800 allies and 2,400 native auxiliaries fell. Aebura was seized.

=== Flaccus campaigns in Celtiberia (180–179 BC) ===
Quintus Fulvius Flaccus then marched across Carpetania and went to Contrebia. The townsfolk sent for Celtiberian assistance, but it did not come and they surrendered. The Celtiberians had been delayed by incessant winter rain which caused floods and made the roads impassable and the rivers difficult to cross. Heavy storms forced Flaccus to move his army into the city. When the rain stopped the Celtiberians went on the march without knowing about the city's surrender. They saw no Roman camp and thought that it had been moved elsewhere or that the Romans had withdrawn. They approached the city without taking precautions and without proper formation. The Romans made a sortie from the two city gates. Caught by surprise the Celtiberians were routed. Not being in formation made resistance impossible, but it helped the majority to escape. Still, 12,000 men died and 5,000 men and 400 horses were captured. The fugitives bumped into another body of Celtiberians on its way to Contrebia which, on being told about the defeat, dispersed. Quintus Fulvius marched through Celtiberian territory, ravaged the countryside and stormed many forts until the Celtiberians surrendered.

In 180 BC the praetor Tiberius Sempronius Gracchus was assigned the command of Hispania Citerior and the conduct of the war with the Celtiberians. Around this time, messengers arrived in Rome, bringing news of the Celtiberian surrender. They then told the senate that there was no need to send subsidies for the army, as Hispania Citerior was now able to sustain itself, and requested that Flaccus be allowed to bring back his army. Livy wrote that this was a must because the soldiers were determined to go back home and it seemed impossible to keep them in Hispania any longer, to the point where they might mutiny if not withdrawn. Tiberius Gracchus objected to this because he did not want to lose the veterans. A compromise was reached: Gracchus was ordered to levy two legions (5,200 infantry but only 400 cavalry instead of the usual 600) and an additional 1,000 infantry and 50 cavalry plus 7,000 Latin infantry and 300 cavalry (a total of 13,200 infantry and 750 cavalry); meanwhile, Flaccus was allowed to bring back home veterans who had been sent to Hispania before 186 BC, while those who arrived after that date were to remain. He could bring back any excess over Gracchus' assigned force of 14,000 infantry and 600 cavalry.

Since his successor was late, Flaccus started a third campaign against the Celtiberians who had not surrendered, ravaging the more distant parts of Celtiberia. The Celtiberians responded by secretly gathering an army to strike at the Manlian Pass, through which the Romans would have needed to pass. However, Gracchus told his colleague, Lucius Postumius, to inform Flaccus that he had nearly arrived from Rome, and that Flaccus was to bring his army to Tarraco (Tarragona), where Gracchus would disband the old army and incorporate the new troops. In the wake of this news, Flaccus abandoned his campaign and withdrew from Celtiberia. The Celtiberians thought that Flaccus was fleeing because he had become aware of their rebellion and continued to prepare their trap at the Manlian Pass. When the Romans entered the pass they were attacked on both sides. Quintus Fulvius ordered his men to hold their ground. The pack animals and the baggage were piled up in one place. The battle was desperate. The native auxiliaries could not hold their ground against men who were armed in the same way but were a better class of soldiers. Seeing that their regular order of battle was no match for the Roman legions, the Celtiberians bore down on them in wedge formation and almost broke their line. Flaccus ordered the Legion's cavalry to close ranks and charge the enemy wedge with loose reins, breaking the wedge and throwing the enemy into disarray. The apparent success of the tactic inspired the native auxiliary cavalry to also let their horses loose on the enemy. The enemy, now routed, scattered through the whole defile. The Celtiberians lost 17,000 men; 4,000 men and 600 horses were captured; 472 Romans, 1,019 Latin allies and 3,000 native auxiliaries died. The Romans encamped outside the pass and marched to Tarraco the next day. Tiberius Sempronius Gracchus had landed two days earlier. The two commanders selected the soldiers who were to be discharged and those who were to remain. Flaccus returned to Rome with his veterans and Gracchus went to Celtiberia.

In his account of this war, Appian wrote that the rebellion was by the tribes which lived along the River Iberus (the Greek name for the Ebro), including the Lusones (a small Celtiberian tribe in the north of Celtiberia, in the high Tajuña River valley, northeast of Guadalajara). He held that the rebellion was caused by the tribes having insufficient land. Whether this was the actual cause of the war is uncertain. He wrote that Quintus Fulvius defeated these tribes. Most of them scattered but those which were destitute and nomadic fled to Complega, a newly built and fortified city which had grown rapidly. They sent messengers who demanded that Flaccus compensate them with a sagos (a Celtic word for cloak), a horse and a sword for every man who was killed in the battle and that the Romans leave Hispania or suffer the consequences. Flaccus said that he would give them plenty of cloaks, followed the messengers and encamped in front of the city. The inhabitants, feeling intimidated, fled and plundered the fields of the neighbouring tribes along their way.

=== Gracchus and Albinus campaigns in the Celtiberia (179 BC) ===
In 179 BC, Gracchus and Lucius Postumius Albinus, who was in charge of the other Roman province (Hispania Ulterior), had their commands extended. They were reinforced with 3,000 Roman and 5,000 Latin infantry and 300 Roman and 400 Latin cavalry. They planned a joint operation. Albinus, whose province had been quiet, was to march against the Vaccaei (a people who lived to the east of Celtiberia) via eastern Lusitania and return to Celtiberia if there was a greater war there, while Gracchus was to head into the furthest part of Celtiberia. He first took the city of Munda by storm with an unexpected attack at night. He took hostages, left a garrison and burned the countryside until he reached the powerful town which the Celtiberians called Certima. A delegation from the town arrived while he was preparing the siege machines. They did not disguise the fact that they would fight to the end if they had the strength, as they asked to be allowed to go to the Celtiberian camp at Alce to ask for help. If this was rejected they would consult among themselves. Gracchus gave them permission. After a few days they returned with ten other envoys. They asked for something to drink. Then they asked for a second cup. Livy wrote that this caused 'laughter at such uncultured ignorance of all etiquette’. Then the oldest man said that they had been sent to enquire what the Romans relied on to attack them. Gracchus replied that he relied on an excellent army and invited them to see it for themselves. He ordered the entire army to march in review under arms. The envoys left and discouraged their people from sending aid to the besieged city. The townsfolk surrendered. An indemnity was imposed on them and they had to give forty young nobles to serve in the Roman army as a pledge of loyalty.

After Certima, Tiberius Gracchus went to Alce, where the Celtiberian camp the envoys had come from was. For a few days he just harassed the enemy by sending larger and larger contingents of skirmishers against their outposts, hoping to draw the enemy out. When the enemy responded he ordered the native auxiliaries to offer only slight resistance and then retreat hastily to the camp, pretending that they had been overwhelmed. He placed his men behind the gates of the rampant of the camp. When the enemy pursued the retreating units in a disorderly manner and came to close range, the Romans came out from all the gates. Caught by surprise, the enemy was routed and lost 9,000 men and 320 men and 112 horses were captured; 109 Romans fell. Gracchus then marched further into Celtiberia, which he plundered. The tribes submitted. In a few days 103 towns surrendered. He then returned to Alce and begun to besiege the city. The townsfolk resisted the first assaults, but when the siege engines were deployed they withdrew to the citadel and then sent envoys to offer their surrender. Many nobles were taken, including the two sons and the daughter of Thurru, a Celtiberian chief. According to Livy he was by far the most powerful man in Hispania. Thurru asked for safe conduct to visit Tiberius Gracchus. He asked him whether he and his family would be allowed to live. When Gracchus replied affirmatively he asked if he was allowed to serve with the Romans. Gracchus granted this. From then on Thurru followed and helped the Romans in many places.

Ergavica, another powerful Celtiberian city, was alarmed about the defeats of its neighbours and opened its gates to the Romans. Livy noted that some of his sources held that these surrenders were in bad faith because whenever Gracchus left hostilities resumed and there was also a major battle near Mons Chaunus (probably Moncayo Massif), which lasted from dawn to midday with many casualties on both sides. His sources also claimed that three days later there was a bigger battle which cost the defeated Celtiberians 22,000 casualties and the capture of 300 men and 300 horses, a decisive defeat which ended the war in earnest. Livy also noted that according to these sources Lucius Postumius Albinus won a great battle against the Vaccaei, killing 35,000. Livy thought that ‘it would be nearer the truth to say that he arrived in his province too late in the summer to undertake a campaign’. Livy did not give any explanation for his doubts about this information about Lucius Postumius Albinus. He did not write anything about his campaigns on his own authority either. However, in an earlier passage, Livy wrote that he arrived in Hispania before Tiberius Gracchus, who gave him a message with instructions for his predecessor, Quintus Fulvius Flaccus.

Appian wrote about two more episodes about the campaign of Tiberius Gracchus. He wrote that the city of Caravis (Magallon, in north-western Aragon), an ally of Rome, was besieged by 20,000 Celtiberians. Gracchus was informed that it would fall soon. He hurried there, but he could not alert them that he was nearby. The commander of the cavalry, Cominius, had the idea of wearing a Hispanic sagum (a military cloak), mingling in the enemy camp and making his way to the town. He informed the townsfolk that Gracchus was nearby and told them to hold out a bit longer. Three days later Gracchus attacked the besiegers, who fled. At about the same time, the people of the town of Complega (location unknown) which, had 20,000 inhabitants, went to Gracchus’ camp pretending to be peace negotiators. They attacked unexpectedly, throwing the Romans into disarray. Gracchus quickly abandoned the camp in a feigned retreat, and then turned on them while they were plundering the camp, killing most of them. He went on to seize Complega. He then allocated land to the poor and made carefully defined treaties with the surrounding tribes and the surrounding country, binding them to be friends of Rome.

Gracchus founded the colony (settlement) of Gracchurris (Alfaro, in La Rioja, northern Hispania) in the Upper Ebro Valley. This marked the beginning of Roman influence in northern Hispania. It was thought that this was the only colony he founded. However, in the 1950s an inscription was found near Mangibar, on the banks of the River Baetis (Guadalquivir) which attests that he founded another one. It was Iliturgi, a mining town and a frontier outpost. Gracchus therefore established a colony outside his province as it was in Hispania Ulterior.

=== Aftermath ===
Appian wrote that Gracchus' ‘treaties were longed for in subsequent wars’. Unlike previous praetors he spent time negotiating and cultivating personal relations with tribal leaders. This was reminiscent of the friendly relations established by Scipio Africanus during the Second Punic War. Gracchus imposed the vicensima, the requisition of 5% of the grain harvest, a form of tax which was more efficient and less vulnerable to abuse than the usual Roman practice of delegating tax collection to private ‘tax farmers.’ Silva notes this is the first reference to a regulatory collection of revenue. His treaties stipulated that the allies were to provide the Romans with auxiliary troops. They also established that the natives could fortify existing cities, but not found new ones. There is some evidence that he introduced civilian administrative measures, such as the issuing of rights for mining to mint coins and the construction of roads. Gracchus is remembered for his administrative arrangements which ensured peace in the conquered territory for the next quarter of a century.

Apart from a few minor episodes, Hispania remained quiet until the outbreak of the Lusitanian War (155–150 BC) and the Second Celtiberian War (154–151 BC).
