= Names of the Celts =

The various names used since classical times for the people known today as the Celts are of disparate origins.

The names Κελτοί (Keltoí) and Celtae are used in Greek and Latin, respectively, to denote a people of the La Tène horizon in the region of the upper Rhine and Danube during the 6th to 1st centuries BC in Graeco-Roman ethnography. The etymology of this name and that of the Gauls Γαλάται Galátai / Galli is uncertain.

The linguistic sense of Celts, a grouping of all speakers of Celtic languages, is modern. There is scant record of the term "Celt" being used prior to the 17th century in connection with the inhabitants of Ireland and Great Britain during the Iron Age. However, Parthenius writes that Celtus descended through Heracles from Bretannos, which may have been a partial (because the myth's roots are older) post–Gallic War epithet of Druids who traveled to the islands for formal study, and was the posited seat of the order's origins.

== Celts, Celtae ==
The first recorded use of the name of Celts – as Κελτοί (Keltoí) – to refer to an ethnic group was by Hecataeus of Miletus, the Greek geographer, in 517 BC when writing about a people living near Massilia (modern Marseille). In the 5th century BC, Herodotus referred to Keltoi living around the head of the Danube and also in the far west of Europe.

The etymology of the term Keltoi is unclear. Possible origins include the Indo-European roots *ḱel, 'to cover or hide' (cf. Old Irish celid), *ḱel-, 'to heat', or *kel- 'to impel'. Several authors have supposed the term to be Celtic in origin, while others view it as a name coined by Greeks. Linguist Patrizia De Bernardo Stempel falls in the latter group; she suggests that it means "the tall ones".

The Romans preferred the name Gauls (Latin: Galli) for those Celts whom they first encountered in northern Italy (Cisalpine Gaul). In the 1st century BC, Caesar referred to the Gauls as calling themselves "Celts" in their own tongue.

According to the 1st-century poet Parthenius of Nicaea, Celtus (Κελτός, Keltos) was the son of Heracles and Celtine (Κελτίνη, Keltine), the daughter of Bretannus (Βρεττανός, Brettanos); this literary genealogy exists nowhere else and was not connected with any known cult. Celtus became the eponymous ancestor of Celts. In Latin, Celta came in turn from Herodotus's word for the Gauls, Keltoi. The Romans used Celtae to refer to continental Gauls, but apparently not to Insular Celts. The latter are divided linguistically into Goidels and Brythons.

The name Celtiberi is used by Diodorus Siculus in the 1st century BC, of a people whom he considered a mixture of Celtae and Iberi.

=== Celtici ===
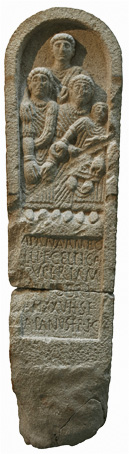
Apana · Ambo/lli · f(ilia) · Celtica / Supertam(arica) · / [C] Miobri · /an(norum) · XXV · h(ic) · s(ita) · e(st) · /Apanus · fr(ater) · f(aciendum)· c(uravit)

Aside from the Celtiberians — Lusones, Titii, Arevaci, and Pellendones, among others – who inhabited large regions of central Spain, Greek and Roman geographers also spoke of a people or group of peoples called Celtici or Κελτικοί living in the south of modern-day Portugal, in the Alentejo region, between the Tagus and Guadiana rivers. They are first mentioned by Strabo, who wrote that they were the most numerous people inhabiting that region. Later, Ptolemy referred to the Celtici inhabiting a more reduced territory, comprising the regions from Évora to Setúbal, i.e. the coastal and southern areas occupied by the Turdetani.

Pliny mentioned a second group of Celtici living in the region of Baeturia (northwestern Andalusia); he considered that they were "of the Celtiberians from the Lusitania, because of their religion, language, and because of the names of their cities".

In Galicia in the north of the Iberian Peninsula, another group of Celtici dwelt along the coasts. They comprised several populi, including the Celtici proper: the Praestamarici south of the Tambre river (Tamaris), the Supertamarici north of it, and the Nerii by the Celtic promontory (Promunturium Celticum). Pomponius Mela affirmed that all inhabitants of Iberia's coastal regions, from the bays of southern Galicia to the Astures, were also Celtici: "All (this coast) is inhabited by the Celtici, except from the Douro river to the bays, where the Grovi dwelt (…) In the north coast first there are the Artabri, still of the Celtic people (Celticae gentis), and after them the Astures." He also wrote that the fabulous isles of tin, the Cassiterides, were situated among these Celtici.

The Celtici Supertarmarci have also left a number of inscriptions, as the Celtici Flavienses did. Several villages and rural parishes still bear the name Céltigos (from Latin Celticos) in Galicia. This is also the name of an archpriesthood of the Roman Catholic Church, a division of the archbishopric of Santiago de Compostela, encompassing part of the lands attributed to the Celtici Supertamarici by ancient authors.

=== Introduction in Early Modern literature ===
The name Celtae was revived in the literature of the Early Modern period. The French celtique and German celtisch first appear in the 16th century; the English word Celts is first attested in 1607. The adjective Celtic, formed after French celtique, appears a little later, in the mid-17th century. An early attestation is found in Milton's Paradise Lost (1667), in reference to the Insular Celts of antiquity: [the Ionian gods ... who] o'er the Celtic [fields] roamed the utmost Isles. (I.520, here in the 1674 spelling). Use of Celtic in the linguistic sense arises in the 18th century, in the work of Edward Lhuyd.

In the 18th century, the interest in "primitivism", which led to the idea of the "noble savage", brought a wave of enthusiasm for all things "Celtic." The antiquarian William Stukeley pictured a race of "ancient Britons" constructing the "temples of the Ancient Celts" such as Stonehenge (actually a pre-Celtic structure). In his 1733 book History of the Temples of the Ancient Celts, he recast the "Celts" "Druids". James Macpherson's Ossian fables, which he claimed were ancient Scottish Gaelic poems that he had "translated," added to this romantic enthusiasm. The "Irish revival" came after the Catholic Emancipation Act 1829 as a conscious attempt to promote an Irish national identity, which, with its counterparts in other countries, subsequently became known as the "Celtic Revival".

=== Pronunciation ===
The initial consonant of the English words Celt and Celtic is primarily pronounced /k/ and occasionally /s/ in both modern British and American English, although /s/ was formerly the norm. In the oldest attested Greek form, and originally also in Latin, it was pronounced /k/, but it was subject to a regular process of palatization around the 1st century AD whenever it appeared before a front vowel like /e/; as the Late Latin of Gaul evolved into French, this palatalised sound became /t͡s/, and then developed to /s/ around the end of the Old French era. The /k/ pronunciation of Classical Latin was later taken directly into German; both pronunciations were taken into English at different times.

The English word originates in the 17th century. Until the mid-19th century, the sole pronunciation in English was /s/, in keeping with the inheritance of the letter ⟨c⟩ from Old French to Middle English. From the mid-19th century onward, academic publications advocated the variant with /k/ on the basis of a new understanding of the word's origins. The /s/ pronunciation remained standard throughout the 19th to early 20th century, but /k/ gained ground during the later 20th century. A notable exception is that the /s/ pronunciation remains the most recognized form when it occurs in the names of sports teams, most notably Celtic Football Club in Scotland, and the Boston Celtics basketball team in the United States. The title of the Cavan newspaper The Anglo-Celt is also pronounced with the /s/.

=== Modern uses ===
In current usage, the terms "Celt" and "Celtic" can take several senses depending on context: the Celts of the European Iron Age, the group of Celtic-speaking peoples in historical linguistics, and the modern Celtic identity derived from the Romanticist Celtic Revival.

==== Linguistic context ====
After its use by Edward Lhuyd in 1707, the use of the word "Celtic" as an umbrella term for the pre-Roman peoples of the British Isles gained considerable popularity. Lhuyd was the first to recognise that the Irish, British, and Gaulish languages were related to one another, and the inclusion of the Insular Celts under the term "Celtic" from this time forward expresses this linguistic relationship. By the late 18th century, the Celtic languages were recognised as one branch within the larger Indo-European family.

==== Historiographical context ====
The Celts are an ethnolinguistic group of Iron Age European peoples, including the Gauls (including subgroups such as the Lepontii and the Galatians), Celtiberians, and Insular Celts.

The timeline of Celtic settlement in the British Isles is unclear and the object of much speculation, but it is clear that by the 1st century BC most of Great Britain and Ireland was inhabited by Celtic-speaking peoples now known as the Insular Celts. These peoples were divided into two large groups, Britons (speaking "P-Celtic") and Gaels (speaking "Q-Celtic"). The Brythonic groups under Roman rule were known in Latin as Britanni, while use of the names Celtae or Galli/Galatai was restricted to the Gauls. There are no examples of text from Goidelic languages prior to the appearance of Primitive Irish inscriptions in the 4th century AD; however, there are earlier references to the Iverni (in Ptolemy c. 150, later also appearing as Hierni and Hiberni) and, by 314, to the Scoti.

Simon James argues that while the term "Celtic" expresses a valid linguistic connection, its use for both Insular and Continental Celtic cultures is misleading, as archaeology does not suggest a unified Celtic culture during the Iron Age.

==== Modern context ====
With the rise of Celtic nationalism in the early to mid-19th century, the term "Celtic" also came to be a self-designation used by proponents of a modern Celtic identity. Thus, in a discussion of "the word Celt," a contributor to The Celt states, "The Greeks called us Keltoi," expressing a position of ethnic essentialism that extends "we" to include both 19th-century Irish people and the Danubian Κελτοί of Herodotus. This sense of "Celtic" is preserved in its political sense in the Celtic nationalism of organisations such as the Celtic League, but it is also used in a more general and politically neutral sense in expressions such as "Celtic music."

== Galli, Galatai ==
Latin Galli might be from an originally Celtic ethnic or tribal name, perhaps borrowed into Latin during the Gallic Wars of the 4th century BCE. Its root may be the Common Celtic *galno-, meaning "power" or "strength". The Greek Γαλάται Galatai (cf. Galatia in Anatolia) seems to be based on the same root, borrowed directly from the same hypothetical Celtic source that gave us Galli (the suffix -atai simply indicates that the word is an ethnic name).

Linguist Stefan Schumacher presents a slightly different account: he derives the ethnonym Galli (nominative singular *Gallos) from the present stem of the verb that he reconstructs for Proto-Celtic as *gal-nV- (V denotes a vowel whose unclear identity does not permit full reconstruction). He writes that this verb means "to be able to, to gain control of", and that Galatai comes from the same root and is to be reconstructed as nominative singular *galatis < *gelH-ti-s. Schumacher gives the same meaning for both reconstructions, namely German: Machthaber, "potentate, ruler (even warlord)", or alternatively German: Plünderer, Räuber, "raider, looter, pillager, marauder"; and notes that if both names were exonyms, it would explain their pejorative meanings. The Proto-Indo-European verbal root in question is reconstructed by Schumacher as *gelH-, meaning German: Macht bekommen über, "to acquire power over" in the Lexikon der indogermanischen Verben.

== Gallaeci ==
The name of the Gallaeci (earlier form Callaeci or Callaici), a Celtic federation in northwest Iberia, may seem related to Galli but is not. The Romans named the entire region north of the Douro, where the Castro culture existed, in honour of the Castro people who settled in the area of Calle – the Callaeci.

== Gaul, Gaulish, Welsh ==
English Gaul / Gaulish are unrelated to Latin Gallia / Galli, despite superficial similarity. The English words ultimately stem from the reconstructed Proto-Germanic root *walhaz, "foreigner, Romanized person." In the early Germanic period, this exonym seems to have been applied broadly to the peasant population of the Roman Empire, most of whom lived in the areas being settled by Germanic peoples; whether the peasants spoke Celtic or Latin did not matter.

The Germanic root likely made its way into French via Latinization of Frankish Walholant "Gaul," literally "Land of the Foreigners". Germanic w regularly becomes gu / g in French (cf. guerre 'war', garder 'ward'), and the diphthong au is the regular outcome of al before another consonant (cf. cheval ~ chevaux). Gaule or Gaulle can hardly be derived from Latin Gallia, since g would become j before a (gamba > jambe), and the diphthong au would be unexplained. Note that the regular outcome of Latin Gallia in French is Jaille, which is found in several western placenames.

Similarly, French Gallois, "Welsh," is not from Latin Galli but (with suffix substitution) from Proto-Germanic *walhisks "Celtic, Gallo-Roman, Romance" or from its Old English descendant wælisċ (= Modern English Welsh). Wælisċ originates from Proto-Germanic *walhiska- 'foreign' or "Celt" (South German Welsch(e) "Celtic speaker," "French speaker," "Italian speaker"; Old Norse valskr, pl. valir "Gaulish," "French,"). In Old French, the words gualeis, galois, and (Northern French) walois could mean either Welsh or the Langue d'oïl. However, Northern French Waulle is first recorded in the 13th century to translate Latin Gallia, while gaulois is first recorded in the 15th century to translate Latin Gallus / Gallicus (see Gaul: Name).

The Proto-Germanic terms may ultimately have a Celtic root: Volcae, or Uolcae. The Volcae were a Celtic tribe who originally lived in southern Germany and then emigrated to Gaul; for two centuries they barred the southward expansion of the Germanic tribes. Most modern Celticists consider Uolcae to be related to Welsh gwalch 'hawk', and perhaps more distantly to Latin falco (id.) The name would have initially appeared in Proto-Germanic as *wolk- and become *walh- via Grimm's Law.

In the Middle Ages, territories with primarily Romance-speaking populations, such as France and Italy, were known in German as Welschland in contrast to Deutschland. The Proto-Germanic root word also yielded Vlach, Wallachia, Walloon, and the second part in Cornwall. The surnames Wallace and Walsh are also cognates.

== Gaels ==
The term Gael is, despite superficial similarity, also completely unrelated to either Galli or Gaul. The name ultimately derives from the Old Irish word Goídel. Lenition rendered the /d/ silent, though it still appears as ⟨dh⟩ in the orthography of the modern Gaelic languages": (Irish and Manx) Gaedheal or Gael, Scottish Gaelic Gàidheal. Compare also the modern linguistic term Goidelic.

== Britanni ==
The Celtic-speaking people of Great Britain were known as Brittanni or Brittones in Latin and as Βρίττωνες in Greek. An earlier form was Pritani, or Πρετ(τ)αν(ν)οί in Greek (as recorded by Pytheas in the 4th century BC, among others, and surviving in Welsh as Prydain, the old name for Britain). Related to this is *Priteni, the reconstructed self-designation of the people later called Picts, which is recorded later in Old Irish as Cruithin and Welsh as Prydyn.
