= Belli =

Ancient Celtic tribe in Iberia

The Iberian Peninsula in the 3rd century BC.

The Belli, also designated Beli or Belaiscos, were an ancient pre-Roman Celtiberian people who lived in the modern Spanish province of Zaragoza from the 3rd Century BC.

== Origins ==
Apparently of mixed Illyrian and Celtic (Belgic) origin and probably related with the Bellovaci, the Belli were said to have migrated to the Iberian Peninsula around the 4th Century BC. They were also part of the Celtiberians. However, there is an overwhelming amount of evidence that the ancestors of the Celtiberian groups were installed in the Meseta area of the peninsula from at least 1000 BC and probably much earlier.

== Location ==
The extent of the Belli people is shown in ochre (darker) yellow.

The Belli inhabited the middle Jiloca and Huerva river valleys in Zaragoza province with their territories stretching up to the Guadalope and upper Turia valleys, close to their neighbours and clients, the Titii.

Their early capital was Segeda (Poyo de Maya – Zaragoza; Celtiberian mint: Sekaiza), subsequently transferred to nearby Durón de Belmonte and later offset by Bilbilis (Valdeherrera, near Calatayud – Zaragoza; Celtiberian mint: Bilbiliz). Other Belli urban centers included Nertobriga (La Almunia de Doña Godina – Zaragoza; Celtiberian mint: Nertobis), Contrebia Belaisca (Zaforas de Botorita – Zaragoza; Celtiberian mint: Contebacom Bel), Beligiom (Piquete de la Atalaya de Azuara – Zaragoza; Celtiberian mint: Belikiom), Belgeda (Belchite – Zaragoza) and Lesera (Moleta dels Frares, near El Forcall – Castellón).

It is plausible that by the 2nd Century BC they exerted some form of control over the strategic frontier towns of Belia (situated somewhere between the Huerva' and Aguas Vivas' rivers; Celtiberian mint: Belaiscom), Osicerda (El Palau de Alcañiz – Teruel; Iberian designation: Usercerte), Damania (Hinojosa de Jarque – Teruel; Celtiberian mint: Tamaniu) and Orosis (La Caridad de Caminreal – Teruel; Celtiberian mint: Orosiz), facing the Iberian Lobetani and Edetani peoples of the modern Valencia coastal region.

== Culture ==
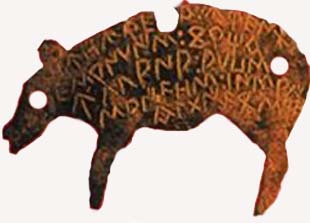
Example of a bronze hospitality token in the Celtiberian Celtic language

The most culturally advanced of the peoples of southern Celtiberia, the Belli were the first Celtiberian tribe to adopt coinage in the aftermath of the Second Punic War and to post laws in written form on bronze tablets (Tabulae), using a modified Northeastern Iberian script (known as the Celtiberian script) for their own language. In this script and language they inscribed the characteristic Celtiberian 'hospitality tokens' which are small bronze objects, in two halves, each half being retained by people who stood in hospitality relationship to one another. These would act as a sort of identity card, and were probably used as safe-conducts or other warranties. The two halves have been found in places several hundreds of kilometres apart, which implies that the various Celtic groups maintained a system of communications throughout at least central Spain.

The most complete Celtiberian text we have on the bronze 'hospitality tokens' that acted as a sort of identity card is from the Belli and reads lubos alisokum aualoske kontebias belaiskas meaning 'Lubos of the Aliso family, son of Aualos, from Contrebia Belaisca' showing the self-description of this man, by paternity, extended family and territory which is characteristically Celtic.

== History ==
During the 3rd-2nd centuries BC, the Belli joined the Celtiberian confederacy alongside the Arevaci, Lusones and Titii, with whom they developed close political and military ties – in 153 BC the Numantines even elected the Belli General Caros as leader of the Celtiberian coalition army that ambushed the Consul Quintus Fulvius Nobilior at the battle of Vulcanalia (Ribarroya), at the Baldano river valley in the beginning of the first Numantine War. Prior to that, they had been forced in 181 BC to accept Roman suzerainty by Tiberius Sempronius Gracchus the Elder, but this did not prevent them from resisting further Roman encroachment of their lands as well as fighting off Turboletae raids and the Iberian Lobetani people.

=== Romanization ===
Defeated in 143 BC by Proconsul Quintus Caecilius Metellus Macedonicus, and faced with the fall of Numantia in 133 BC and the subsequent collapse of the Celtiberian confederacy, the Belli territory was incorporated into Hispania Citerior province though little is known of their history afterwards. The Belli appear to have remained independent until the Sertorian Wars of the early 1st Century BC, when they sided with Quintus Sertorius and provided auxiliary troops to his army. During that conflict, the Belli found themselves being gradually pushed back from the upper Jiloca by the Edetani who seized Beligiom, Belgeda, Damania and Orosis, therefore losing all the lands east of the Huerva River. In 73 BC proconsuls Pompey and Quintus Caecilius Metellus Pius gained ground in Celtiberia, conquering one by one all the cities allied with Sertorius, including the Belli capital Bilbilis. Around 72 BC they and their Titii allies merged with the pro-Roman Uraci, Cratistii and Olcades tribes to form the Late Celtiberian people (Latin: Celtiberi) of romanized southern Celtiberia.

== See also ==
- Belgae
- Bellovaci
- Celtiberian confederacy
- Celtiberian script
- Celtiberian Wars
- Cratistii
- Illyrians
- Numantine War
- Pre-Roman peoples of the Iberian Peninsula

== Bibliography ==
- Ángel Montenegro et alii, Historia de España 2 - colonizaciones y formación de los pueblos prerromanos (1200-218 a.C), Editorial Gredos, Madrid (1989) ISBN 84-249-1386-8
- Alberto J. Lorrio, Los Celtíberos, Universidad Complutense de Madrid, Murcia (1997) ISBN 84-7908-335-2
- Francisco Burillo Mozota, Los Celtíberos, etnias y estados, Crítica, Barcelona (1998) ISBN 84-7423-891-9
- Rafael Trevino and Angus McBride, Rome's Enemies (4): Spanish Armies 218BC-19BC, Men-at-Arms series 180, Osprey Publishing Ltd, London (1986) ISBN 0-85045-701-7
- Leonard A Curchin (5 May 2004). The Romanization of Central Spain: Complexity, Diversity and Change in a Provincial Hinterland. Routledge. pp. 37–. ISBN 978-1-134-45112-8.
- Philip Matyszak, Sertorius and the struggle for Spain, Pen & Sword Military, Barnsley (2013) ISBN 978-1-84884-787-3

=== Further reading ===
- Aedeen Cremin, The Celts in Europe, Sydney, Australia: Sydney Series in Celtic Studies 2, Centre for Celtic Studies, University of Sydney (1992) ISBN 0-86758-624-9.
- Dáithí Ó hÓgáin, The Celts: A History, The Collins Press, Cork (2002) ISBN 0-85115-923-0
- Daniel Varga, The Roman Wars in Spain: The Military Confrontation with Guerrilla Warfare, Pen & Sword Military, Barnsley (2015) ISBN 978-1-47382-781-3
- Ludwig Heinrich Dyck, The Roman Barbarian Wars: The Era of Roman Conquest, Author Solutions (2011) ISBNs 1426981821, 9781426981821
- John T. Koch (ed.), Celtic Culture: A Historical Encyclopedia, ABC-CLIO Inc., Santa Barbara, California (2006) ISBN 1-85109-440-7, 1-85109-445-8
