= Tanginus =

Celtiberian chief during the Numantine war

- Tangino, Tancino
- Born: Celtiberia
- Military career
- Allegiance: Arevaci
- Service years: 141 BC
- Conflicts: Numantine War

Tanginus (known as Tangino in Spanish) was a chieftain of the Celtiberians, active during the Numantine War.

== Biography ==
Despite his allegiance to the Numantines during the war, Tanginus' original tribe is unknown. It is usually acknowledged he was under the umbrella term of a Celtiberian, although he might have been also a Celt given that his name was common in Lusitania. Later tradition claims Tanginus was a merchant before the war. In any case, he went to follow the usual warring activities of the Celtiberians, who often sacked the territories attacked by Tanginus.

He entered the Numantine War in 141 BC, while Quintus Pompeius was battling Celtiberian settlements around the oppidum of Numantia. Leading large contingents of bandits, Tanginus sacked the territories of the Edetanians and Sedetanians, allies to Rome, which forced Pompeius to leave Numantia and march to protect their vassals. Some argue this could have been Tanginus's goal, as previous attempts to break the siege of Numantia by force had proved to be unsuccessful. Pompeius encountered Tanginus in Salduie (modern day Zaragoza), where the Celtiberian crossed the Ebro river to keep the distance with the more numerous Romans. However, Pompeius crossed it too with cavalry troops and reached their enemies in Ebelinum (Ayerbe), after which the rest of his army followed them and defeated the Celtiberians.

Tanginus's final fate is unknown, although it is traditionally believed he survived and escaped by horse. However, Pompeius captured many of his warriors, which attracted a great deal of attention in ancient sources: unwilling to become prisoners or slaves, many of the seized Celtiberians killed themselves, their captors and each other, to the point the Romans had to tie them up to stop the bloodshed. Even when Pompeius tried to send the survivors to Rome by sea, the prisoners fought the sailors and scuttled the ships, dying all of them. Tanginus's efforts nevertheless was not in vain, as when Pompeius returned to Numantia to resume the siege, he suffered repeated defeats and was forced to sign a peace treaty.

== Etymology ==
The name Tanginus or Tancinus has Celtic and Germanic roots.

== See also ==
- Numantine War
- Olyndicus
- Viriathus
