= Titii (Celtiberian) =

Small and obscure Celtiberian people

The Iberian Peninsula in the 3rd century BC.

The Titii or Tithii were a small and obscure Celtiberian people, whose lands were located along the middle Jalón and upper Tajuña valleys, somewhere between Alhama de Aragón in Zaragoza and Molina de Aragón in Guadalajara provinces.

== Origins ==
The extent of the Titii people is shown in light yellow.

The Titii were of Celtic origin, whose ancestors probably migrated to the Iberian Peninsula around the 4th Century BC, and part of the Celtiberians. There is an overwhelming amount of evidence that the ancestors of the Celtiberian groups were installed in the Meseta area of the Iberian Peninsula from at least 1000 BC and probably much earlier.

== Culture ==
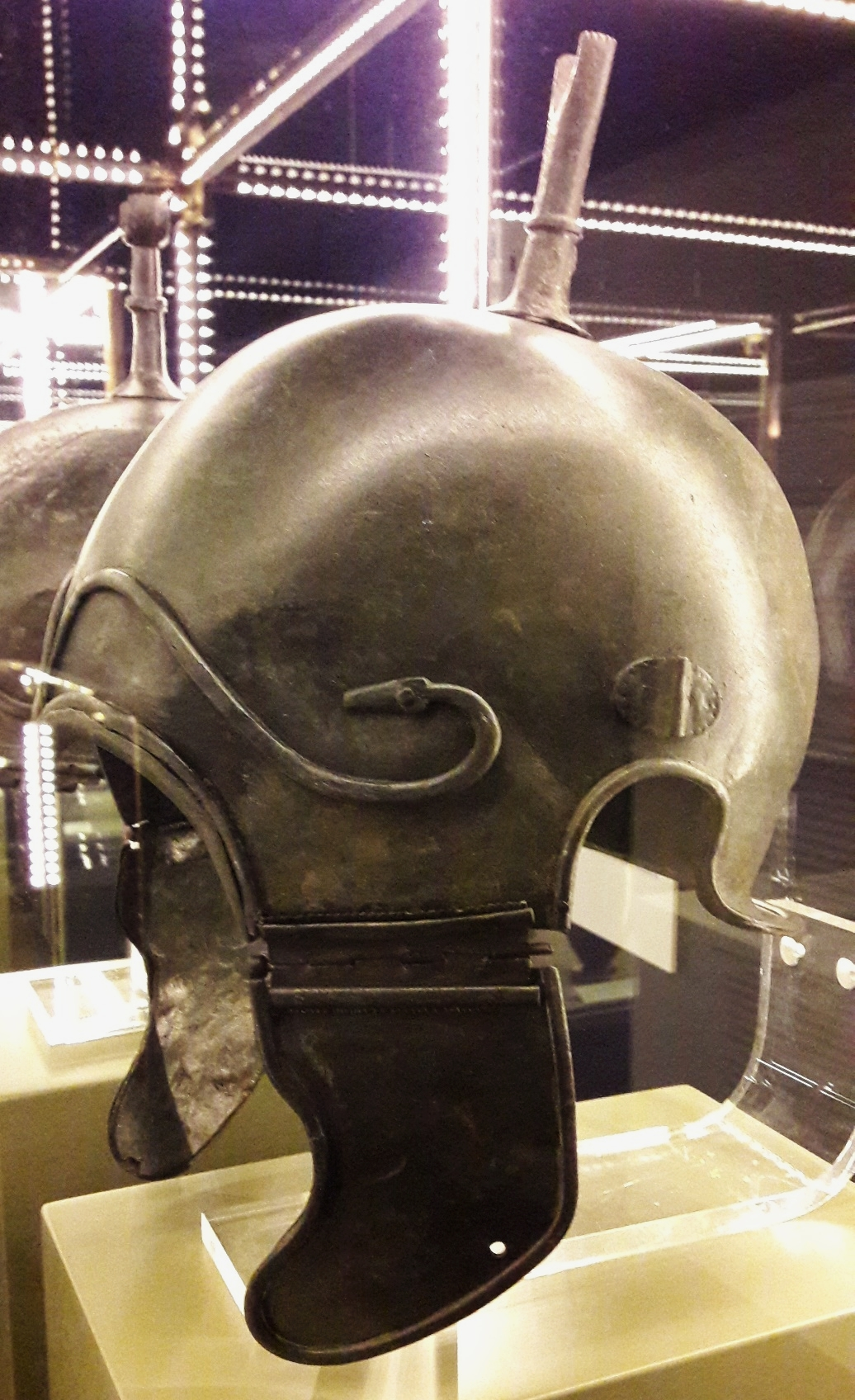
Restored Hispano-Chalcidian helmet (Chalcidian type 02) from Aranda de Moncayo, dated from the 5th to 3rd centuries BC, on display at the National Museum in Warsaw.

Due to the lack of extensive archaeological surveys, no Iron Age settlements connected with this people were ever found in the area. Nevertheless, analysis of numismatic finds from the Jalón-Tajuña (ancient Tagonius) area has led some archaeologists to relate the mints of three unknown Celtiberian towns – Aratis/Aratikos, Titum, and Titiakos – with the Titii, pointing Titum as their presumed capital.

It was only in 2016 that the town of Aratis was rediscovered and identified with the Iron Age site of Castejón I – El Romeral at Aranda de Moncayo in Zaragoza province. Between 1993 and 2013, the ten-hectare site was plundered by Ricardo Granada Pérez, a local retiree turned treasure hunter who, by using metal detectors and a GPR, illegally excavated 4,000 archeological artifacts dating from the 3rd to 1st centuries BC, including a set of eighteen celtiberian helmets of the Chalcidian type (a.k.a. Iberian-Celtic or Hispano-Chalcidian; Cascos de Aratis) that were smuggled out of Spain and sold at auctions held in London and Oberhaslach in France. Out of this total, sixteen helmets were bought by the German building contractor and collector of antique weapons Axel Guttmann, who kept them on his private collection until his death in 2001.

== History ==
Often mentioned in the ancient sources as allies or clients of the Belli, they were subjected to Turboletae raids in the 3rd century BC and seem to have submitted by Carthage just prior to the Second Punic War, but what role they played in that conflict remains obscure. However, during the Celtiberian Wars of the 2nd century BC they sided with the Belli and Arevaci against Rome, being recorded as one of the signatories of the peace treaty with Tiberius Sempronius Gracchus in 179 BC.

In 147 BC they and the Belli initially supported Rome against the Lusitani led by Viriathus, although three years later the Titii switched sides and alongside the Arevaci and Belli, they joined Viriathus' anti-Roman revolt. The Titii also retained their political autonomy until they were defeated alongside the Belli in 142 BC by Proconsul Quintus Caecilius Metellus Macedonicus, being subsequently included into Hispania Citerior province in 134 BC. During the Sertorian Wars, the Titii sided with Quintus Sertorius and provided auxiliary troops to his army, but after the end of the war in 72 BC they merged with the Belli, Uraci and Cratistii tribes to create the Late Celtiberian people of romanized southern Celtiberia, losing their tribal identity in the process.

== See also ==
- Celtiberian confederacy
- Celtiberian script
- Celtiberian Wars
- Chalcidian helmet
- Numantine War
- Pre-Roman peoples of the Iberian Peninsula
