= Celtiberian confederacy =

The Celtiberian confederacy was a tribal federation formed around the mid-3rd century BC, by the Arevaci, Lusones, Belli and Titii, with the Arevacian city of Numantia as the confederate capital.

During the Second Punic War the confederacy kept itself neutral, though Celtiberian mercenaries are mentioned fighting for both sides on a number of occasions. The first Roman incursion into the Celtiberian heartland occurred around 195 BC under Consul Cato the Elder, who attacked unsuccessfully the towns of Seguntia Celtiberorum and Numantia, where he allegedly delivered a speech to the numantines.

Upon the fall of Numantia in 134-133 BC, the Romans forcibly disbanded the Celtiberian confederacy and allowed the Pellendones' and Uraci to regain their independence from the Arevaci, who were now technically submitted and absorbed into Hispania Citerior province.

== See also ==
- Celtiberian Wars
- Numantine War
- Pre-Roman peoples of the Iberian Peninsula
