= Cratistii =

Ancient people

The Iberian Peninsula in the 3rd century BC.

The Cratistii (Greek Kratistioi) were an ancient pre-Roman, stock-raising people whose lands were situated along the upper Tagus valley, in the elevated plateau region of the western Cuenca and northeast Province of Teruel.

== Origins ==
An intriguing people, their ethnic origins are difficult to determine, though their tribal name means "the most powerful". They bear no close relation to the Caristii who lived further north in the modern Vizcaya and Álava Basque provinces.

== Culture ==
Archeological evidence retrieved from the cemetery of Madrigueras (Albacete) suggests that their culture was strongly Celtiberianized, being more closely affiliated with that of the neighbouring Olcades. Their presumed capital was Segobriga (Cerro de Cabeza de Griego, Saelices – Cuenca; Celtiberian-type mint: Sekobirikes) and they held the important towns of Ercavica (Cañaveruelas – Cuenca; Celtiberian-type mint: Ercauica), and Contrebia Carbica (Fosos de Bayona, Villas Viejas – Cuenca; Celtiberian-type mints: Contebacom/Carbicom/Konterbia Karbica).

== History ==
Initially a dependent tribe of the Carpetani since at least the early 3rd Century BC, the Cratistii were submitted to Carthaginian rule upon the conquest of eastern Carpetania by Hannibal in 221-220 BC. Later they appear to have gravitated gradually towards the Roman sphere in the aftermath of the Second Punic War only to be raided by the Lusitani, who sacked Segobriga in 146 BC. During the Sertorian Wars of the early 1st Century BC, the Cratistii appear to have resisted Quintus Sertorius attempts to subjugate eastern Carpetania, possibly laying siege to the Cratistii town of Contrebia Carbica in 77 BC, and ultimately forcing them to join the Sertorian cause. Later in 73 BC proconsuls Pompey and Quintus Caecilius Metellus Pius gained ground in Celtiberia and conquered one by one all the cities allied with Sertorius, including the Cratistii capital Segobriga. Following the end of that conflict, the Cratistii regained their independence from the enfeebled Carpetani and were incorporated alongside their Uraci neighbours into romanized southern Celtiberia.

== See also ==
- Carpetani
- Celtiberian script
- Olcades
- Pre-Roman peoples of the Iberian Peninsula
- Uraci
