= Lobetani =

Pre-Roman Iberian people mentioned by Ptolemy

The Iberian Peninsula in the 3rd century BC.

The Lobetani (Greek: Lobetanoi), were a small pre-Roman Iberian people of ancient Spain mentioned only once by Ptolemy in the 2nd century AD, situated around the mountainous Albarracín area of the southwest Province of Teruel.

== Culture ==
The extent of the Lobetani people is shown in darker green.

The Lobetani's own ethnical and linguistical affiliation remains difficult to determine however, with some modern authors considering them Celtic; others believe they spoke a form of the Iberian Language. In archeological terms, they are the least known of the southeastern Iberian tribes, even though their capital Lobetum (Greek: Lobeton) has been identified with the Iron Age site of El Castellar de Frías, near Albarracín; another Lobetani town was Orosis (Caminreal, Teruel; Greek- and Roman-style mints: Orose and Orosi).

== History ==
What part the mysterious Lobetani played in the history of the region is still unknown, but it is clear that they became allies of Rome around the time of the Second Punic War or shortly afterwards, clashing with the Celtiberian Belli and the Turboletae people. Incorporated into Hispania Citerior Province after 156 BC, the Lobetani retained their independence until the beginning of the 1st century BC when they were absorbed by their Edetani neighbors, and subsequently romanized by the wider Roman civilization.

== See also ==
- Celtiberians
- Contestani
- Edetani
- Turboletae
- Pre-Roman peoples of the Iberian Peninsula
