= Turboletae =

Pre-Roman people from the Iberian peninsula

The Iberian Peninsula in the 3rd century BC.

The Turboletae or Turboleti (Greek: Torboletoi or Torboletes) were an obscure pre-Roman people from ancient Spain, which lived in the northwest Teruel province since the early 3rd Century BC.

== Origins ==
Their ethnical and linguistical affiliation is difficult to determine, though it seems that they were of part-Celtic, part-Illyrian ancestry, being confused by some ancient authors with either the Iberian Turdetani of Baetica or the Turduli.

== Culture ==
Their capital was the town of Turda, Turba, Turbola or Turbula, whose precise location is unknown, with some archeologists tentatively placing it at the Iron Age site of Alto Chácon (Muela de San Juan), in the vicinity of modern Teruel. No other pre-Roman sites connected with this people have been identified though recent archeological surveys at some Iron Age settlements in the Teruel region show that they were culturally affiliated with the Celtiberians. It has also been attributed to them the celtiberian inscription of Peñalva de Villastar.

== History ==
A warlike people whose tribal name later became a byword for unruly behaviour, the Turboletae were a constant source of trouble to most of their neighbours. Not only they harassed the Celtiberian Belli and Titii, but also raided the southeastern Iberian peoples throughout most of the 3rd century BC, in particularly the Edetanian city-state of Saguntum. As allies of Carthage the Turboletae actively participated in the incident that triggered the Second Punic War, the siege of Saguntum in 219-218 BC, where they assisted the Carthaginian troops in the final assault and looting of the city, slaughtering a great deal of its inhabitants. The backlash came in 212 BC when the Romans and their Edetani allies invaded Turboletania, seized the capital Turba and razed it to the ground, selling his residents to slavery.

In 205 BC the exhausted Turboletae sued for peace, on which the Roman Senate forced them to pay a huge compensation to the surviving citizens of Saguntum. However, the resentment fuelled by the heavy tribute imposed, coupled with the destruction of their capital city in the previous years may account for the Tuboletae revolt of 196 BC, under the apparent leadership of two generals named Budares and Baesadines. After being crushed by Quintus Minucius Thermus, Praetor of Hispania Citerior in a pitched battle near the ruins of Turba, the remaining Turboletae population appears to have been either obliterated or simply reduced to subject status and their devastated lands divided among the Bastetani and Edetani, resulting in their total disappearance from the historical record.

== See also ==
- Celtiberians
- Celtiberian script
- Illyrians
- Lobetani
- Pre-Roman peoples of the Iberian Peninsula
