= Olcades =

The Iberian Peninsula in the 3rd century BC.

The Olcades were an ancient stock-raising pre-Roman people from Hispania, who lived to the west of the Turboletae in the southeastern fringe of the Iberian system mountains.

== Origins ==
Related to both the Celtiberians and Carpetani, the Olcades appear to have been a mix of indigenous Iberians under the rule of an aristocracy of Gallic origin. It is believed that the latter sprang from the Volcae Tectosages of southern Gaul, who arrived in Iberia in the wake of the Celtic migrations of the 4th Century BC.

== Location ==
From the 4th century BC, they occupied most of the modern province of Cuenca, along with the southern tip of Guadalajara and the western fringe of Valencia, where their capital Cartala (Los Villares, near Caudete de las Fuentes; Iberian-type mint: Kelin) – also designated Althea or Althia, and Altaia by some Greek authors – was sited. Other Olcades' towns were Caesada (Hita – Guadalajara; Iberian-type mint: Kaiseza?), Ercavica (Cañaveruelas – Cuenca; Iberian-type mint: Erkauika), Ikalkusken (Arcas – Cuenca) and Laxta (Iniesta? – Cuenca).

== Culture ==
Archeological evidence recovered from local cemeteries, such as Buenache and Olmedilla de Alarcón, indicates that the Olcades' culture was strongly influenced by contacts with southern Iberian, Phoenician, Etruscan and Greek traders; indeed, they are considered to have been responsible for the cultural ‘Iberianization’ of neighbouring Celtiberia and Carpetania during the 2nd Iron Age.

== History ==
In 221 BC, under the leadership of their King Tagus (also known as Tago or Tagum), the Olcades entered into a defensive alliance with the Vaccaei and Carpetani to resist Carthaginian expansion into the Meseta, only to be defeated by Hannibal Barca at the battle on the Tagus in 220 BC. Submitted to Punic rule by Hannibal just prior to the Second Punic War, the Olcades were thence forced to contribute mercenary troops to his army, for the Greek historian Polybius lists them among the Iberian troops sent by him as reinforcements to Africa in 218 BC. After Hannibal’s departure to Italy, however, they switched sides and fought as Roman allies for the remainder of the conflict. Despite being included in the province of Hispania Citerior in 156–154 BC by the Romans, the Olcades nonetheless seemed to have remained loyal allies of Rome, subsequently successfully fighting off the attacks of the Lusitani under Viriathus in the mid-2nd Century BC.

=== Romanization ===
They kept themselves independent until the late 2nd or early 1st centuries BC when, for unclear reasons, they were dispossessed of their tribal lands by Rome. Not only did the Praetor of Hispania Citerior, Gaius Valerius Flaccus, founded the military colony of Valeria (Las Valeras – Cuenca) in 92 BC on Olcadian territory after obtaining a great victory over the Celtiberians in the previous year, but he also divided it among Rome's own Edetani and Celtiberian allies, forcing the Olcades to merge with the latter.

== See also ==
- Carpetani
- Celtiberian script
- Edetani
- Vaccaei
- Volcae Tectosages
- Northeastern Iberian script
- Pre-Roman peoples of the Iberian Peninsula
