= Uraci =

Celtic people of pre-Roman Iberia

The Iberian Peninsula in the 3rd century BC.

The Uraci or Duraci (Greek: Urakoi) were a little-known Celtic people of pre-Roman Iberia who dwelt to the east of the Vaccaei and the Carpetani, occupying the southern Soria, northern Guadalajara and western Zaragoza provinces since the 4th century BC.

== Origins ==
Of mixed Illyrian and Gallic origin, the latter possibly related to the Helvetic Rauraci, the Uraci migrated to the Iberian Peninsula around the 4th Century BC during the Celtic migration, and their tribal name can be roughly translated as "those [placed] farther apart".

== Location ==
The Uraci settled the eastern meseta and the southern slopes of the Central Iberian System mountains between the upper Duero and upper Henares rivers, being neighbours of the Carpetani. Their capital was the town of Lutiaca (Luzaga? – Guadalajara; Celtiberian mint: Lutiacos/Louitiscos); they also controlled the strategic towns of Cortona (Medinacelli – Soria), Segontia (Sigüenza – Guadalajara) and Arcobriga (Monreal de Ariza – Zaragoza).

== Culture ==
It is assumed that the Uraci spoke a 'Q-Celtic' language and archeological evidence shows that their material culture little differed from the Celtiberians.

== History ==
Forced to become clients of the powerful Arevaci around the late 4th or early 3rd Centuries BC, the Uraci were certainly obliged to provide military assistance to their patrons' throughout most of the 2nd Century BC, but what role they played in the Second Punic War and subsequent conflicts with Rome remains unclear. In about 92 BC the Uraci began to overthrow Arevacian overlordship – quite plausibly at Roman instigation – being rewarded with the town of Numantia from the defeated Pellendones for helping the Romans in suppressing the early 1st Century BC anti-Roman uprisings in Celtiberia (the 4th Celtiberian War). However, they recovered their independence only for a short period at the end of the Sertorian Wars in 72 BC, after which they were included as Roman allies into pacified southern Celtiberia.

== See also ==
- Celtiberian confederacy
- Celtiberian script
- Celtiberian Wars
- Helvetii
- Illyrians
- Numantine War
- Pre-Roman peoples of the Iberian Peninsula
