= Lusones =

Ancient Celtiberian (Pre-Roman) people of the Iberian Peninsula

The Iberian Peninsula in the 3rd century BC.

The Lusones (Greek: Lousones) were an ancient Celtiberian (Pre-Roman) people of the Iberian Peninsula (the Roman Hispania), who lived in the high Tajuña River valley, northeast of Guadalajara. They were eliminated by the Romans as a significant threat in the end of the 2nd century BC.

== Origins ==
The extent of the Lusones people is shown in blue.

They spoke a variety of the Celtiberian language and were a subdivision of the Celtiberians. There is an overwhelming amount of evidence that the ancestors of the Celtiberian groups were installed in the Meseta area of the Iberian Peninsula from at least 1000 BC and probably much earlier.

A mixed people, they included elements of early Italic (Osco-Latin) and Gallic affiliation, the latter possibly related to the namesake Helvetic Lusones from present-day Switzerland or from Pannonia, who migrated to the Iberian Peninsula around the 4th Century BC. Some scholars also reasoned that they might bear a connection with the Lusitani, with the latter people being actually an off-shot of the Lusones that migrated to the west of the Peninsula during the 4th Century BC.

== Location ==
The Greek geographer Strabo located the Lusones near the Tajo headwaters, whereas the historian Appian places them along the Ebro. In fact, their lands were located in the Aragonese region along the middle Ebro, on the Moncayo range (Latin: Mons Chaunus) between the Queiles and Huecha rivers, occupying the western Zaragoza and most of Soria, stretching to the northeastern fringe of nearby Guadalajara and southern Navarre provinces.

Their presumed capital was Turiaso or Turiasso (La Oruña, Vera de Moncayo – Zaragoza; Celtiberian mint: Turiazu); other key Lusones towns were Calagurris/Galagorina (Calahorra – La Rioja; Celtiberian mint: Kalacoricos), Cascantum/Cascanton (Cascante – Navarre; Celtiberian mint: Caiscata), Bursau/Bursada (Borja – Zaragoza; Celtiberian mint: Burzao), Carabis/Caravis (Magallón – Zaragoza; Celtiberian mint: Carauez). They were also involved in the foundations of both the ‘bandit town’ of Complega (site unknown; Celtiberian mint: Kemelon) and the Roman colony of Grachurris (Alfaro – La Rioja) by Tiberius Sempronius Gracchus the Elder in 181 BC.

== History ==
The Lusones joined their neighbours the Arevaci, Belli and Titii into the Celtiberian Confederacy in the 3rd-2nd centuries BC and fought alongside their allies in the Celtiberian Wars against Rome, from 181 BC until the destruction of Numantia brought the collapse of the alliance in 134-133 BC. In between, the Lusones were defeated by Proconsul Quintus Caecilius Metellus Macedonicus in 142 BC, and despite being forcibly incorporated into Hispania Citerior province, they continued to resist Roman authority for decades.

Remaining warlike as ever, the Lusones plotted with the Arevaci and Pellendones the anti-Roman uprisings that rocked Celtiberia throughout most of the 1st Century BC. These revolts served only to weaken the Lusones' militarily however, and by mid-Century they had been driven out from the right bank of the Ebro by the Vascones, who seized four of their key border towns including Grachurris. During the Sertorian Wars, the Lusones sided with Quintus Sertorius and provided auxiliary troops to his army, but virtually disappear from the historical record upon the end of that conflict in 72 BC, and little is known from them afterwards though is likely that they merged with – or were absorbed by – their neighbours the Belli and Titii.

== See also ==
- Berones
- Celtiberian confederacy
- Celtiberian script
- Celtiberian Wars
- Helvetii
- Numantine War
- Pre-Roman peoples of the Iberian Peninsula

== Bibliography ==
- Aedeen Cremin, The Celts in Europe, Sydney, Australia: Sydney Series in Celtic Studies 2, Centre for Celtic Studies, University of Sydney (1992) ISBN 0-86758-624-9.
- Ángel Montenegro et alii, Historia de España 2 - colonizaciones y formación de los pueblos prerromanos (1200-218 a.C), Editorial Gredos, Madrid (1989) ISBN 84-249-1386-8
- Alberto J. Lorrio, Los Celtíberos, Universidad Complutense de Madrid, Murcia (1997) ISBN 84-7908-335-2
- Francisco Burillo Mozota, Los Celtíberos, etnias y estados, Crítica, Grijalbo Mondadori, S.A., Barcelona (1998, revised edition 2007) ISBN 84-7423-891-9
- Leonard A Curchin (5 May 2004). The Romanization of Central Spain: Complexity, Diversity and Change in a Provincial Hinterland. Routledge. pp. 37–. ISBN 978-1-134-45112-8.
- Javier Armendáriz Martija, "Sertorio contra los berones: Masacre en la ciudad de Vareia", in Desperta Ferro – Antigua y medieval No. 95, Madrid (2026) ISSN 2171-9276, pp. 46-50.

=== Further reading ===
- Daniel Varga, The Roman Wars in Spain: The Military Confrontation with Guerrilla Warfare, Pen & Sword Military, Barnsley (2015) ISBN 978-1-47382-781-3
- Ludwig Heinrich Dyck, The Roman Barbarian Wars: The Era of Roman Conquest, Author Solutions (2011) ISBNs 1426981821, 9781426981821
