= Olyndicus =

Celtiberian war chief (died 170 BC)

Olyndicus (?–170 BC), also known as Olonicus, was a Celtiberian war chief who led a rebellion against Rome, fighting against the praetor Lucius Canuleius Dives and his troops, in the province of Hispania Ulterior. According to Florus, he was a great leader, and a cunning and daring warrior.

Olyndicus was said to have behaved like a prophet and to have led his troops wielding a magical silver lance, sent to him by the gods from the sky.

== See also ==
- Tanginus
- Celtiberian Wars
