= Elbora =

Elbora, an Ancient (Latinized) Celtiberian name, may refer to the following Iberian places :

- Évora, capital of the southern Portuguese Alentejo region
- Talavera de la Reina, a city and municipality in the western part of the province of Toledo, in the autonomous community of Castile–La Mancha, central Spain
