= La Hoya, Álava =

Archaeological site in the Basque Country, Spain

La Hoya
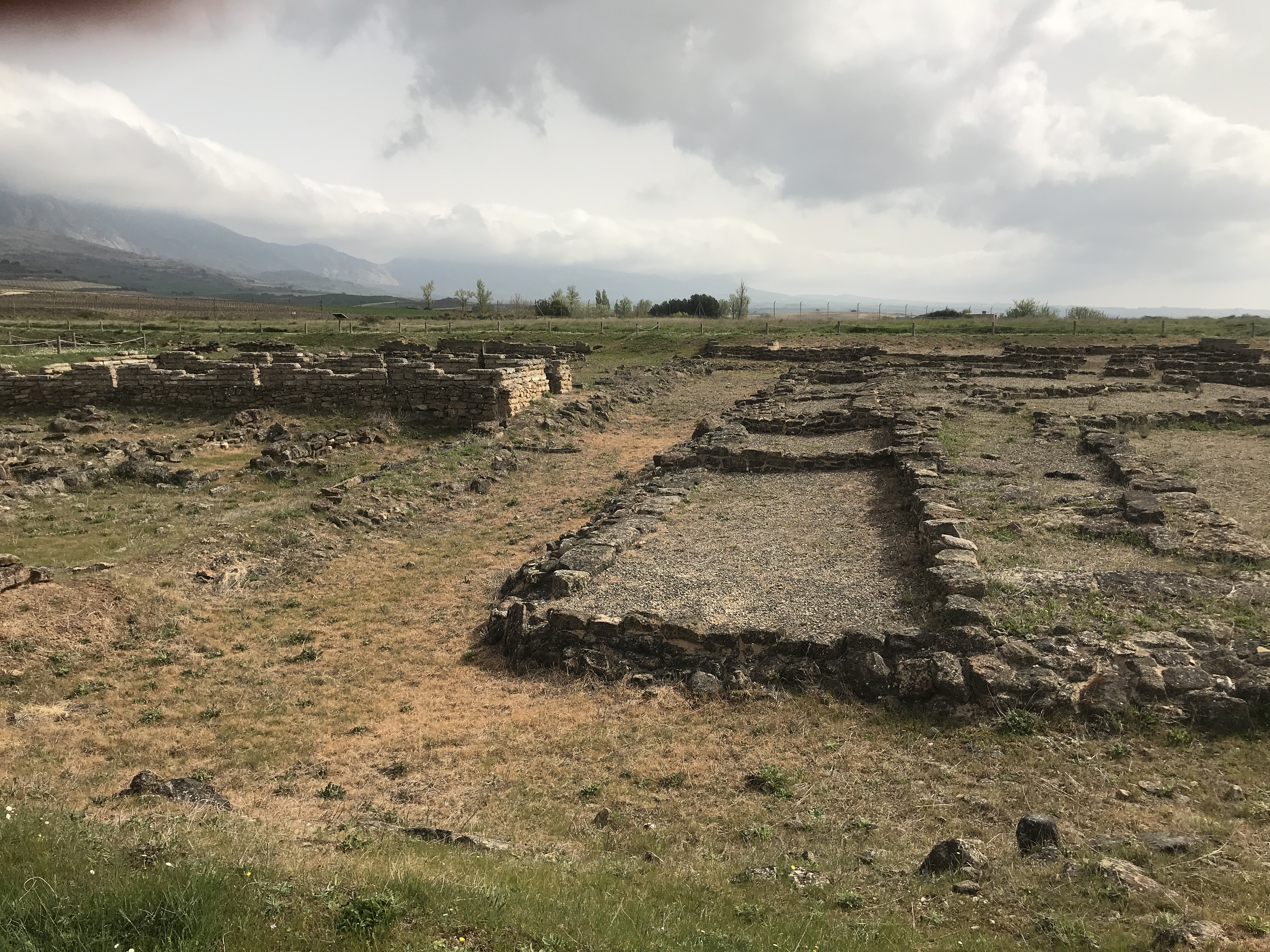
- View of La Hoya

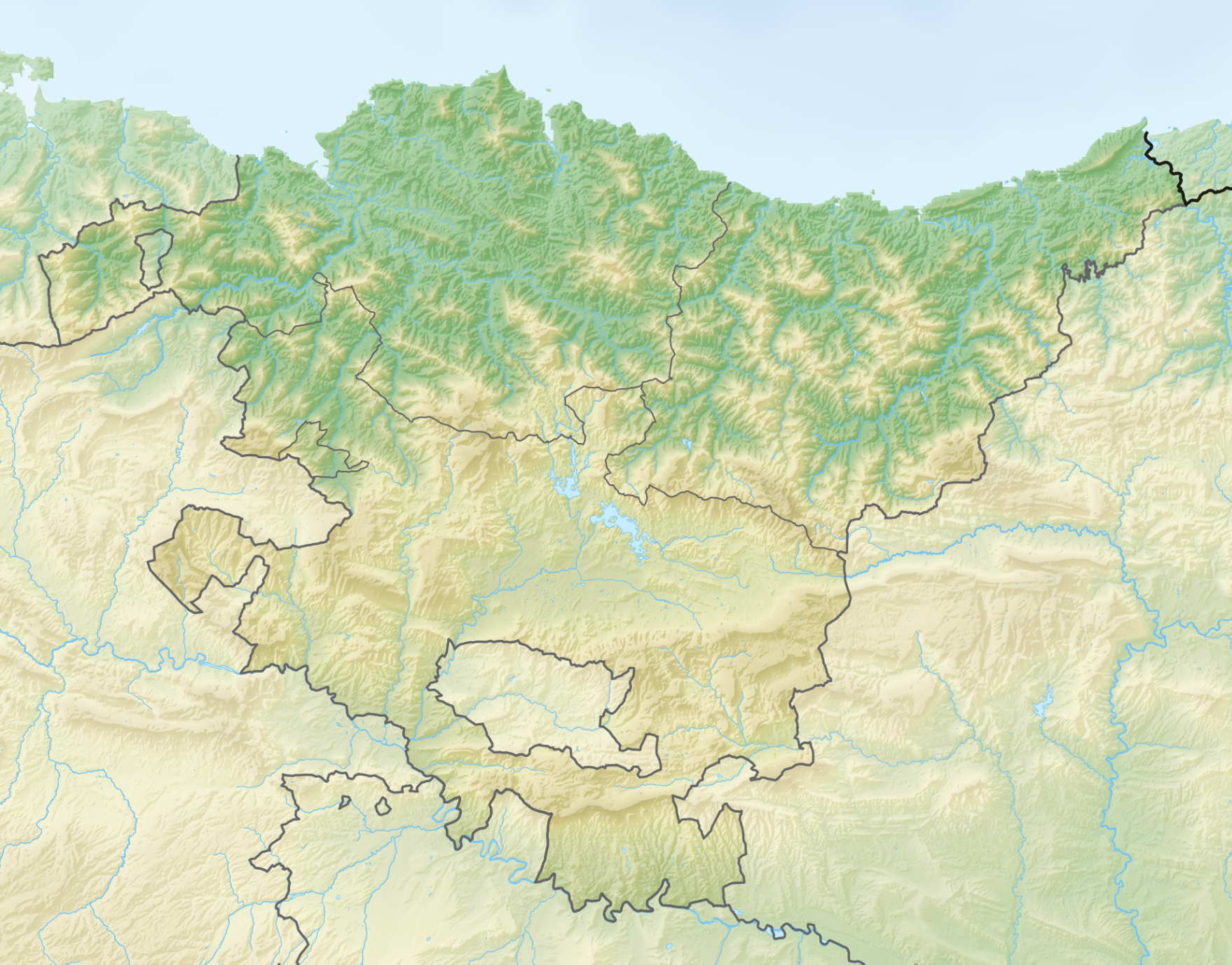
- Location within the Basque Country Location within Spain
- 42.565°N 2.5864°W
- Type: Settlement
- Cultures: Celtiberian
- Location: Laguardia, Álava, Basque Country, Spain

History
- Built: 12th century BCE
- Abandoned: c. 250 BCE

Site notes
- Area: 5.1 ha (13 acres)
- Archaeologists: Alejandro Sampedro Martínez; Armando Llanos
- Discovered: 1935

Spanish Cultural Heritage
- Official name: Recinto Arqueológico de la Hoya
- Type: Non-movable
- Criteria: Monument
- Designated: 17 July 1984
- Reference no.: RI-51-0005133

La Hoya is an important archaeological site of the Bronze and Iron Ages in Laguardia, Álava, Basque Country, Spain. The fortified town was inhabited between the 12th and 3rd centuries BCE. It has three levels:

- Middle-Late Bronze Age: in this early period, the fortifications, as well the houses, were all made of wood.
- Early-Middle Iron Age: construction became more complex using mixed formulas with stone, wood and adobe. Most houses were near the wall in this period.
- The Late Iron Age, with a cultural context that some classify as Celtiberian, shows important changes in urbanization: with paved streets and plazas that form a reticular structure. The wall is also rebuilt on stone. This final period also shows great advancement in the technologies: potter's wheel, elaborated blacksmithing, etc.

The successive layers of rubble, that served as cementations for further edification, make up a small tell 3 meters high.

The town was destroyed violently between 350 and 200 BCE, leaving the remains of the people and their everyday items in the streets.
