= Quintus Fulvius Nobilior =

Roman consul

Quintus Fulvius Nobilior was a Roman consul who obtained the consulship in 153 BC. His father Marcus Fulvius Nobilior and his brother Marcus Fulvius Nobilior (consul 159 BC) were also consuls.

Nobilior and his father were patrons of the writer Quintus Ennius.

== Career ==
In 153 BC, Quintus Fulvius Nobilior was in charge of a 30.000 strong army to campaign in Spain, which was largely unsuccessful. The Roman army was initially deployed against the oppidum of Segeda, whose Celtiberian inhabitants, the Belli, had been expanding its walls and attacking other nearby tribes. Segeda was destroyed, but the Belli assembled an army under chieftain Carus, which ambushed the Roman army in a move compared to the Battle of Lake Trasimene, inflicting heavy losses. Moving west to the meseta, Nobilior laid siege to Numantia, an oppidum whose inhabitants were to give Rome trouble for years and had sheltered the Belli when they fled their city. The Roman army faced difficult conditions in the winter and had to withdraw. Nobilior was replaced as consul in 152 BC by Marcus Claudius Marcellus.

He was censor with Appius Claudius Pulcher, probably in 136 BC.

The Roman camp at Renieblas in Spain may have been Q. Fulvius Nobilior's winter quarters.

== Cultural impact ==
Nobilior was designated consul in 154 BC, however his appointment could not come into effect until the Ides of March, the day for settling debts that marked the end of the calendar year. To overcome this obstacle, and recognizing the need for immediate action, the Roman Senate decreed January 1 as the new beginning to the civil year.
