= Arevaci =

Celtic people who settled in the central Meseta of northern Hispania

Main language areas in Iberia c. 300 BC

The Arevaci or Aravaci (Arevakos, Arvatkos or Areukas in the Greek sources), were a Celtiberian people who settled in the central Meseta of northern Hispania and dominated most of Celtiberia from the 4th to late 2nd centuries BC. The Vaccaei were their allies.

== Origins ==
The Arevaci were of Celtic origin and part of the group of peoples known as the Celtiberians. There is an overwhelming amount of evidence that the ancestors of the Celtiberian groups were installed in the Meseta area of the Iberian Peninsula from at least 1000 BC and probably much earlier. Some think their ancestors were early ‘Q-Celtic’ speakers from Gaul who migrated to the peninsula around the mid-6th century BC, arriving at about the same time as the powerful Vaccaei people of the western Meseta. This led some modern historians to state that the Arevaci were actually an offshoot of the latter, thus their tribal name which means ‘Are-Vaccei’ or 'eastern' Vacceians. However, an alternative etymology is given by the Roman geographer Pliny the elder who calls them Celtiberi Arevaci, adding that they borrowed their name from the river Areva (Araviana) and thus their designation could be translated as "those who dwell at the Areva" or "on the Areva".

== Location ==
The extent of the Arevaci people is shown in red.

The nucleus of the Arevaci homeland was the modern provinces of Soria and most of Guadalajara up to the Tagus sources, extending to the eastern half of Segovia and the southeastern Burgos, but for a while they dominated parts of neighbouring Zaragoza province. They founded or seized several important city-states (Civitates) in northern Celtiberia, namely:

- Clunia (either Alto del Cuerno or Coruña del Conde – Burgos; Celtiberian mint: Kolounioku),
- Voluce/Veluka (around Calatañazor – Soria),
- Uxama Argelae (Cerro de Castro, near Osma – Soria; Celtiberian mints: Arcailicos/Uzamuz),
- Segontia Lanka (Cerro de la Cuesta del Moro, near Langa de Duero – Soria; Celtiberian mint: Sekontias Lankas),
- Termantia (Montejo de Tiermes – Soria) also named Termes or Termesos,
- Savia (Soria?)
- Numantia (Muela de Garray – Soria).
- Segovia.

Other towns often mentioned in the sources, such as Ocilis, Comfluenta, Tucris, Lutia, Mallia, Lagni and Colenda have not yet been located.

== Culture ==
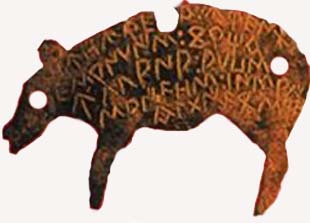
Bronze hospitality token from Soria with inscription in the Celtiberian language

They shared with the Vaccaei the same social structure of collectivist type which enabled the latter to exploit successfully the wheat- and grass-growing areas of the western plateau, though archeological evidence suggests that the Arevaci were predominantly stock-raisers who practiced transhumance in the grazing lowlands of the upper Ebro valley. They reared sheep (mostly for their wool), horses, and oxen, as attested by the tribute of thirty talents imposed upon Numantia and Termantia by Consul Quintus Aulus Pompeius in 139 BC, for which the Numantines and Termantines paid (albeit reluctantly) in the form of 3,000 ox-hides, 800 horses, and 9,000 saga (woollen cloaks).

=== Religion ===
They practised the rite of excarnation by exposing the corpses of warriors slain in battle to the vultures, as described by Silius Italicus and Claudius Aelianus, and attested by funerary stelae and painted pottery from Numantia.

== History ==
Regarded by the Greeks and Romans as the most militaristic people of the eastern Meseta, the Arevaci were said by Herodotus to have embarked early on an expansionist policy by taking part in the Celtici migrations of the 5th century BC alongside off-shots of Lusones and Vaccaei peoples to settle in the Iberian southwest. In the late 4th-early 3rd centuries BC however, the Arevaci shifted the direction of their expansion to the east, towards the upper Duero and south into the central Iberian system mountains. Here they displaced the earlier inhabitants the Pellendones, conquering the towns of Savia and Numantia and submitted the Uraci, thus gaining control over the strategic towns of Aregrada (Ágreda? – Soria; Celtiberian mints: Areicoraticos/Arecorataz), Cortona (Medinaceli? – Soria), Segontia (Sigüenza – Guadalajara) and Arcobriga (Monreal de Ariza – Zaragoza).

In around the mid-3rd century BC, the Arevaci founded with their neighbours the Lusones, Belli, and Titii, a tribal federation designated the Celtiberian confederacy, with Numantia as its capital.

During the Second Punic War the confederacy kept itself neutral, though Celtiberian mercenaries are mentioned fighting for both sides on a number of occasions. The first Roman incursion into the Celtiberian heartland occurred around 195 BC under Consul Cato the Elder, who attacked unsuccessfully the towns of Seguntia Celtiberorum and Numantia, where he allegedly delivered a speech to the numantines.

The Arevaci and the Belli revolted against Roman rule in the Celtiberian War.

With the fall of Numantia in 134-133 BC, the Romans forcibly disbanded the Celtiberian confederacy and allowed the Pellendones and Uraci to regain their independence from the Arevaci, who were now technically submitted and absorbed into Hispania Citerior province. Nevertheless, the remaining Arevacian cities managed to keep much of their military capabilities intact, and led by Clunia and Termantia they helped defending Celtiberia from invasion attempts by both the Lusitani in 114 BC and the Cimbri, who poured from the Pyrenees around 104-103 BC. Emboldened by these successes – and resented by the lack of Roman recognition for their efforts – the Arevaci began secretly hatching plots against Roman rule by stirring up their equally disgruntled Celtiberian neighbours into the 99-81 BC uprisings (a.k.a. 3rd Celtiberian ‘War’). However, not only were the Arevacians ruthlessly quashed by Proconsul Titus Didius in 93-92 BC, but also had to endure the destruction of their new capital, Termantia, and the city of Colenda in around 98-94 BC.

=== Romanization ===
In spite of being technically made subject and finally aggregated to Hispania Citerior after 93 BC, the Arevacians’ relationship with Rome remained uneasy. During the Sertorian Wars, the Arevaci sided with Quintus Sertorius and provided auxiliary troops to his army, with the towns of Clunia, Uxama and Segontia Lanka offering stubborn resistance to Pompey long after Sertorius had been assassinated. In fact, they still continued to resist Roman integration and assimilation policies for decades, a situation coupled by fiscal abuse that led to sporadic outbursts of violence well into the late 1st century BC.

Although the Arevaci later, in 29 BC, contributed an auxiliary cavalry unit (the Ala Hispanorum Aravacorum) to fight alongside the Roman legions in the first Astur-Cantabrian war, Tacitus cites heavy taxation as the major reason for a revolt in the Termes region which resulted in the ambush and assassination of Lucius Calpurnius Piso, Praetor of H. Citerior Tarraconensis in 25 BC.

== See also ==
- Astur-Cantabrian war
- Celtiberian confederacy
- Celtiberian script
- Celtiberian Wars
- Numantine War
- Pre-Roman peoples of the Iberian Peninsula
