= Celtiberian Wars =

Second century BCE insurrections against Roman rule by Iberian Celts

The First Celtiberian War (181–179 BC) and Second Celtiberian War (154–151 BC) were two of the three major rebellions by the Celtiberians (a loose alliance of Celtic tribes living in east central Hispania, among which we can name the Pellendones, the Arevaci, the Lusones, the Titti and the Belli) against the presence of the Romans in Hispania.

When the Second Punic War ended, the Carthaginians relinquished the control of its Hispanic territories to Rome. The Celtiberians shared a border with this new Roman province. They started to confront the Roman army acting in the areas around Celtiberia and this led to the First Celtiberian War. The Roman victory in this war and the peace treaties established by the Roman praetor Gracchus with several tribes led to 24 years of relative peace.

In 154 BC, the Roman Senate objected to the Belli town of Segeda building a circuit of walls, and declared war. Thus, the Second Celtiberian War (154–152 BC) started. At least three tribes of Celtiberians were involved in the war: the Titti, the Belli (towns of Segeda and Nertobriga) and the Arevaci (towns of Numantia, Axinum and Ocilis). After some initial Celtiberian victories, the consul Marcus Claudius Marcellus inflicted some defeats and made peace with the Celtiberians. The next consul, Lucius Licinius Lucullus, attacked the Vaccaei, a tribe living in the central Duero valley which was not at war with Rome. He did so without the authorisation of the Senate, with the excuse that the Vaccaei had mistreated the Carpetani. The Second Celtiberian War overlapped with the Lusitanian War of (154–150 BC).

The third major rebellion following the Celtiberian Wars was the Numantine War (143–133 BC), sometimes considered as the Third Celtiberian War.

== Prelude ==
The Romans took over the territories of the Carthaginians in southern Hispania when they defeated them at the Battle of Ilipa in 206 BC during the Second Punic War (218–201 BC). After the war, they established two Roman provinces: Hispania Citerior (Nearer Spain) along most of the east coast, an area roughly corresponding to the modern autonomous communities of Aragon, Catalonia and Valencia, and Hispania Ulterior (Further Spain) in the south, roughly corresponding to modern Andalusia. There were numerous rebellions by many tribes of Hispania, including tribes both inside and outside Roman territory, in most years for 98 years, until the end of the First Celtiberian War in 179 BC.

The Celtiberians, or Hispanic coalitions formed in part by Celtiberians, soon clashed with the new imperial power. In 197 BC, 20,000 Celtiberians attacked a Roman army near Iliturgis, and in 195 BC, 10,000 Celtiberians joined the Turduli against Rome. A consular army by Cato the Elder was sent to the Celtiberia, and, despite not being able to take Saguntia, prompted the Celtiberians to stop hostilities in 195 BC. Soon after Cato returned to Rome, in 193 BC, a coalition of Celtiberians, Vaccei and Vettones was defeated by Marco Fulvio Nobilior near Toletum. In the same area, in the 185 BC, a new Hispanic coalition (probably of Celtiberians, Vettones and Carpetani), defeated two praetorian armies, but were defeated in another clash near the Tagus river.

In 182 BC, Quintus Fulvius Flaccus would step up the pressure by acting closer to Celtiberia. Flaccus conquered the city of Urbicua. In response, the Celtiberians raised an army of 35,000 men.

== The First Celtiberian War (181–179 BC) ==
=== The siege of Aebura (Carpetania) (181 BC) ===
To confront the 35,000-strong Celtiberian army, Flaccus received reinforcements of 3,000 Roman and 6,000 allied infantry and 200 Roman and 300 allied cavalry, and raised as many auxiliary troops from the friendly tribes as he could. He went to Carpetania and defeated the Celtiberian army near Aebura 23,000 Celtiberians died and 4,700 were captured, against losses of 200 Romans, 800 allies and 2,400 native auxiliaries, and the Romans seized the city. The details given by Livy suggest that the Celtiberians formed an organised coalition, using an army composed both by cavalry and infantry, and fighting in closed battle formations by using banners.

=== Flaccus campaigns in the Celtiberia (180–179 BC) ===
Quintus Fulvius Flaccus then marched across Carpetania and went to Contrebia. A Celtiberian army was sent to protect the city, but due to the intense rains it arrived when the city had already surrendered. The Celtiberians were caught by surprise by the Roman army exiting the city. Most escaped, but 12,000 men died and 5,000 men, 400 horses and 62 banners were captured. The fugitives bumped into another body of Celtiberians on its way to Contrebia which, on being told about the defeat, dispersed. Quintus Fulvius marched through Celtiberian territory, ravaged the countryside and stormed many forts until the Celtiberians surrendered.

Since his successor, Tiberius Sempronius Gracchus, was late, Flaccus started a third campaign against the Celtiberians who had not surrendered, ravaging the more distant parts of Celtiberia, where the Lusones lived. On his way back to Tarraco to hand the command of the army to Gracchus, Flaccus was ambushed at the Manlian Pass. Flaccus defeated the Celtiberians (killing 17,000 and capturing 3,700 men and 600 horses), but suffered important losses (4400 men). Flaccus continued to Tarraco, and then to Rome with his some of veterans, while Gracchus went to Celtiberia.

=== Gracchus campaigns in the Celtiberia (179 BC) ===
Assisted by his colleague, Lucius Postumius Albinus, Gracchus marched to Celtiberia. Gracchus first took the city of Munda, and then attacked the powerful town of Certima. The town asked for help to a Celtiberian military camp in the nearby city of Alce, who sent ten envoys to enquire the Romans about the reasons of the attack. After Gracchus ordered the entire army to march in review in front of them, the legates left and discouraged their people from sending aid to the besieged city. Munda surrendered, sent forty young nobles as hostages and an indemnity was imposed on them. After Certima, Tiberius Gracchus defeated the Celtiberians guarding the military camp in Alce (Livy mentions 9,000 men and 320 men and 112 horses captured; 109 Romans fell). Gracchus then captured the city, and negotiated the defection of some important nobles, including what Livy thought was by far the most powerful man in Hispania, a Celtiberian chief named Thurru. Ergavica, another Celtiberian city, was alarmed about the defeats of its neighbours and opened its gates to the Romans. In addition, Gracchus defeated 20,000 Celtiberians who were besieging the city of Caravis (Magallon, in north-western Aragon), an ally of Rome, and conquered the city of Complega.

Livy thought that some of the surrenders were in bad faith because whenever Gracchus left hostilities resumed and there was also a major battle near Mons Chaunus (probably Moncayo Massif) with many casualties on both sides. Three days later there was a bigger battle which cost the defeated Celtiberians 22,000 casualties and the capture of 300 men and 300 horses. This last defeat was so decisive that prompted an end to hostilities.

=== Aftermath ===
Gracchus signed a series of treaties with the Celtiberians that ‘were longed for in subsequent wars’. Unlike previous praetors he spent time to negotiate and cultivate personal relations with tribal leaders. After the surrender of Complega, he allocated land to the poor and made carefully defined treaties with the surrounding tribes and the surrounding country, binding them to be friends of Rome. Gracchus imposed the vicensima, the requisition 5% of the grain harvest, a form of tax which was more efficient and less vulnerable to abuse than the usual Roman practice of tendering tax collection to private ‘tax farmers.’ Silva notes this is the first reference to a regulatory collection of revenue. His treaties stipulated that the allies were to provide the Romans with auxiliary troops. They also established that the natives could fortify existing cities, but not found new ones. There is some evidence that he introduced civilian administrative measures, such the issuing of rights for mining to mint coins and the construction of roads. In addition, Gracchus founded the colony (settlement) of Gracchurris (Alfaro, in La Rioja, northern Hispania) in the Upper Ebro Valley; and Iliturgi, a mining town and a frontier outpost in Hispania Ulterior.

Gracchus' administrative arrangements and treaties ensured peace in the conquered territory for the next quarter of a century. Apart from a few minor episodes, Hispania remained quiet until the outbreak of the Lusitanian War (155–150 BC) and the Second Celtiberian War (154–151 BC).

== Second Celtiberian War (154–152 BC) ==
=== Causes ===
Appian wrote that this war broke out because Segeda (near Zaragoza), a powerful city of the Celtiberian tribe of the Belli, persuaded the people of some smaller towns to settle there and was building a circuit of walls seven kilometres long. It also forced the neighbouring Titti to join in. The Belli had agreed to the treaties Tiberius Sempronius Gracchus had made with tribes in Hispania at the end of the First Celtiberian War. Rome considered that Segeda was breaking the treaty. It forbade the building of the wall, demanded the tribute and the provision of a contingent for the Roman army in accordance with the stipulations of Gracchus' treaty. The Segedans replied that the treaty forbade the construction of new towns, but did not forbid the fortification existing ones. They also said that they had been subsequently released from the tribute and the military contingent by the Romans. This was true, but the senate argued that when it granted such exemptions it always specified that they were to continue only during its pleasure. The senate must have decided to withdraw the exemptions because it was worried about the development of Segeda into a powerful city in the land of the Celtiberians, who had a history of rebellions. Rome prepared for war.

=== Victories of the Celtiberian coalition ===
In 153 BC the praetor Quintus Fulvius Nobilior arrived in Hispania with a force of nearly 30,000 men. The people of Segeda, whose wall had not been completed, fled and sought refuge among the Arevaci. The Arevaci welcomed them and chose a Segedan, Carus, as their commander. He prepared 20,000 infantry and 500 cavalry for an ambush in a thick forest and attacked the Romans as they were passing through. It was a long battle, which he won; 6,000 Romans were killed. Carus was killed together with 6,000 of his men by the Roman cavalry which was guarding the Roman baggage while he was pursuing the fugitives from the battle in a disorderly manner. Nevertheless, the battle was a disaster for the Romans and, from then, on they would not engage in battle on the day of the festival of the god Vulcan because this defeat occurred on that day.

The Arevaci assembled at the town of Numantia (7 km north of Soria) which had strong natural defences, and chose Ambo and Leuco as their leaders. Three days later Nobilitor encamped four kilometres from the town. He was joined by 300 cavalry and ten elephants sent by Masinissa, the king of Numidia, a Roman ally in Africa. Before the ensuing battle, Nobilitor placed the elephants at the rear so that they would not be seen and then divided the army into two. During the battle he brought them into view. This frightened the enemy, who had never seen these animals. They fled inside the town. Nobilitor attacked the city walls and there was a fierce battle. Then an elephant was hit by a large falling stone and made a loud noise which frightened the other elephants. They went on the rampage, trampling over the Romans, who took to disorderly flight. The Numantines made a sortie and killed 4,000 Romans and three elephants. Nobilitor then attacked the town of Axinium which stored the enemy supplies, but did not achieve anything. He lost many men and returned to his camp at night. He sent his cavalry commander to pursue an alliance with a neighbouring tribe and ask for cavalry assistance. He was given some horsemen, but an ambush was prepared against him when he was on his way back. In the resultant ambush the allied horsemen fled and the Roman commander and many of his troops were killed. These Roman disasters encouraged the town of Ocilis (Medinaceli, in the modern province of Soria) to defect to the Celtiberians. The Roman provisions were kept in this town. Nobilitor withdrew to his winter camp and suffered food shortages. Because of this, heavy snowstorms and frost many of his men died.

In 152 BC Marcus Claudius Marcellus, consul for the third time, took over the command, bringing 8,000 infantry and 500 cavalry to Hispania. An ambush against him was prepared, but he avoided it by moving cautiously and he encamped in front of Ocilis. He seized the town, granted it pardon, took hostages and imposed a fine of thirty talents. His moderation encouraged the people of Nertobriga (a town of the Belli, in the modern province of Zaragoza) to ask for peace. Marcellus asked for 100 cavalry and they agreed. However, in the meantime the Roman rear guard was attacked and a lot of booty was taken. When the promised cavalry arrived its leaders said that this had been done by some people who did not know about the agreement with the Romans. Marcellus chained the horsemen, sold their horses, plundered the countryside and began to besiege the town, which sent a herald to ask for peace again. Marcellus stated that he would not grant peace unless the Arevaci, Belli, and Titti asked for it together. The Nertobriges sent ambassadors to these tribes and asked Marcellus for leniency and for the renewal of the treaty made with Gracchus. This was opposed by some rural people who had been incited to war. Marcellus sent envoys from each party to Rome to carry on their dispute there and sent private letters to the senate letters urging peace. He wanted to bring the war to an end himself and gain glory this way.

=== The Celtiberians send envoys to Rome and agree to stop hostilities ===
Appian wrote that the envoys of the friendly faction were treated as guests in the city, whereas those of the hostile faction were lodged outside the city walls, as customary. Polybius specified that it was the Belli and Titti who had taken the side of Rome. Because of this their envoys were admitted into the city, while those of the Arevaci, as they were enemies, were ordered to encamp on the other side of the River Tiber. The Senate heard the friendly envoys first. They said that if the rebels were not punished properly they would soon take up arms again and make the whole of Hispania inclined to rebel. They asked either that the Roman army should remain in Hispania and that it should be commanded by a consul to check the malpractices of the Arevaci or, if the troops were to be withdrawn, that Rome should inflict an exemplary punishment on them. According to Polybius, when the envoys of the Arevaci were heard, they came across as not being willing to submit or to accept defeat and gave the impression that they thought that they had fought more brilliantly than the Romans. They said that they would pay a penalty, should it be imposed on them, but demanded that the Romans should revert to the terms of the treaty of Tiberius Gracchus. The officers of Marcus Claudius Marcellus were then heard. It seemed that they were inclined towards peace and the senate thought that the consul was more disposed towards the enemy than the allies. Appian wrote that the senate was not happy that these people had refused the terms put forward earlier by Nobilitor. However, when he described the campaign by Nobilitor he did not mention him making any terms with the Celtiberians. The senate replied that Marcellus would communicate its decision to them.

Polybius wrote that the private opinion of the senate was that what the allies said was true and to the advantage of Rome, that the Arevaci had a high opinion of themselves and that Marcellus was afraid of war. It secretly ordered the officers Marcellus had sent to continue to fight. It mistrusted Marcellus and it was minded to send one of the new consuls to replace him. It made preparations for the campaign as if the future of Hispania depended in this, assuming that if the enemy was defeated all the other tribes would submit to Rome and that if the Arevaci could avoid further war they and all others tribes would be encouraged to resist. Quintus Fulvius Nobilitor spread rumours of continuous battles and great Roman losses and about the valour of the Celtiberians, as well as claims that Marcellus was afraid of continuing the war. The young recruits panicked and found excuses to avoid recruitment which could not be verified. Competent officers were not willing to serve. Then, the young Publius Cornelius Scipio Aemilianus spoke in the senate and asked to be allowed to be sent to Hispania as an officer or a junior commander and that he was ready to assume such role. He was willing to do so even though he had been given the safer task of going to Macedon where he had been invited to go to settle disputes there. All were surprised because of his youth and cautious disposition. He became popular and made those who had been avoiding military service feel ashamed. The young men enlisted and the officers volunteered. Appian wrote that the army to be sent to Hispania was chosen by lot instead of the customary levy. It was the first time this happened. This was because ‘many had complained that they had been treated unfairly by the consuls in the enrolment, while others had been chosen for easy service’.

In 151 BC the new consul, Lucius Licinius Lucullus, was assigned Hispania. While he was on his way, Marcellus told the Celtiberians about the impending war and returned the hostages. He had a long conversation with the chief of the embassy which had gone to Rome. He sought to persuade the Celtiberians to put matters in his hands because he wanted to bring the war to an end before the arrival of Lucullus. After this 5,000 Arevaci took possession of the city of Nertobriga and Marcellus encamped near Numantia. While he was driving the inhabitants inside the wall, their leader asked for a meeting with Marcellus. He said that the Arevaci, Belli and Titti would put themselves in his hands. He demanded and received hostages and money and let them go free. Thus, Marcellus managed to bring the war to an end before the arrival of Lucullus.

=== Lucullus' illegal war on the Vaccaei ===
Appian wrote that Lucius Licinius Lucullus was greedy for fame and money and attacked the Vaccaei because he was ‘in straitened circumstances'. This was despite the fact that the senate had not declared war on them and this tribe had never attacked the Romans. He crossed the River Tagus and encamped near the town of Cauca (Coca) The inhabitants asked him what he had come for and what the reason for war was. He replied that they had mistreated the Carpetani and that he had come to their aid. The Caucaei attacked a party of Roman wood cutters and foragers, killed many of them and pursued the fugitives to their camp. In the ensuing battle, being more like a light infantry, they had the advantage at first. However, when they run out of darts they fled and 3,000 of them were killed while they were forcing their way through the gates. The town elders sought peace. Lucullus demanded hostages, 100 talents of silver and a contingent of cavalry for his army. When these were provided, he also demanded that the town be garrisoned by the Romans. This was agreed and Lucullus ordered 2,000 picked soldiers to seize the city. Then the rest of the Roman army, which had been ordered to kill all adult males, was let in. Only a few out of 20,000 managed to escape. Some of them went to other towns. They burnt what they could not take with them to deprive Lucullus of booty.

Lucullus marched on the town of Itercatia (location uncertain), where more than 20,000 infantry and 2,000 cavalry had taken refuge. He called for peace talks. The inhabitants reproached him for the slaughter of the Caucaei and asked him if he intended to do the same to them. Appian wrote: "he, like all guilty souls, being angry with his accusers instead of reproaching himself, laid waste their fields". He then begun a siege and repeatedly lined up his men for battle to provoke a fight. The enemy did not respond. One man often rode into the gaps between the Roman armies and challenged for single fight. Nobody accepted and he went back making insulting gestures. Then the young Scipio Aemilianus accepted and luckily defeated this big man even though he was small. This lifted the spirit of the Romans. However, the next night an enemy cavalry contingent which had gone out foraging before Lucullus had arrived run about shouting and those inside the city also shouted. This caused terror in the Roman camp. The soldiers were sick due to lack of sleep and dysentery caused by the local food they were not used to. Many died of the latter. When some of the siege works were completed the Romans knocked down a section of the city walls, but they were quickly overpowered. They fled and not knowing the area many fell into a reservoir and died. The enemy repaired the wall. As both sides suffered famine, Scipio Aemilianus proposed peace and promised that it would not be violated. The Itercalati trusted him and gave Lucullus 10,000 cloaks, some cattle and fifty hostages as part of the terms.

Next Lucullus went to Pallantia (Pelencia). This town was hosting a large number of refugees and was renowned for its bravery. He was advised to avoid it, but he heard that it was a rich town. He encamped there and did not leave until constant harassment of the Roman foragers by the Pallantian cavalry prevented him from getting supplies. The Romans withdrew and were pursued by the enemy until they reached the River Durius (Douro). Then they went back home at night. Lucullus went to the territory of the Turdetani and went into winter camps This was the end of his illegal war against the Vaccaei. He was never called to account for it.

Appian commented: "As for the gold and silver that Lucullus was after (and for the sake of which he had waged this war, thinking that all of Hispania abounded with gold and silver), he got nothing. Not only did they have none, but these particular [tribes] did not set any value on those metals.

In his account of the Lusitanian War, Appian wrote that Lucullus and Servius Sulpicius Galba, a praetor who was in charge of the troops in Hispania Ulterior and was campaigning against a Lusitanian rebellion, conducted a joint pincer operation against Lusitania. According to Appian they gradually depopulated it. Appian described Galba as being even more Greedy than Lucullus. He killed many Lusitanians by treachery.

=== Aftermath ===
In 147 BC, four years after the end of the Second Celtiberian War, the Lusitanians, who had rebelled between 155 BC and 150 BC, rebelled again in the Viriathic War (147–139 BC). In 144 BC, the fourth year of this war, Viriathus, the Lusitanian leader, incited the Celtiberians to rebel. This led to the Numantine War (143–133 BC), which was the longest war of resistance against the Romans.

== Sources ==
The First Celtiberian War is covered in Livy's detailed Ab urbe condita. The books of Livy's work which cover the period of the Second Celtiberian War have been lost. Only a few fragments of Polybius' writings about Hispania are extant. We only have four fragments on the Second Celtiberian War and these only cover the story of Celtiberian envoys who went to Rome. For this war we rely on Appian's books on the wars in Hispania.

== See also ==
- Celtiberians
- Iberians
- Olyndicus
- Hispania
