= Langa de Duero =

- Municipality
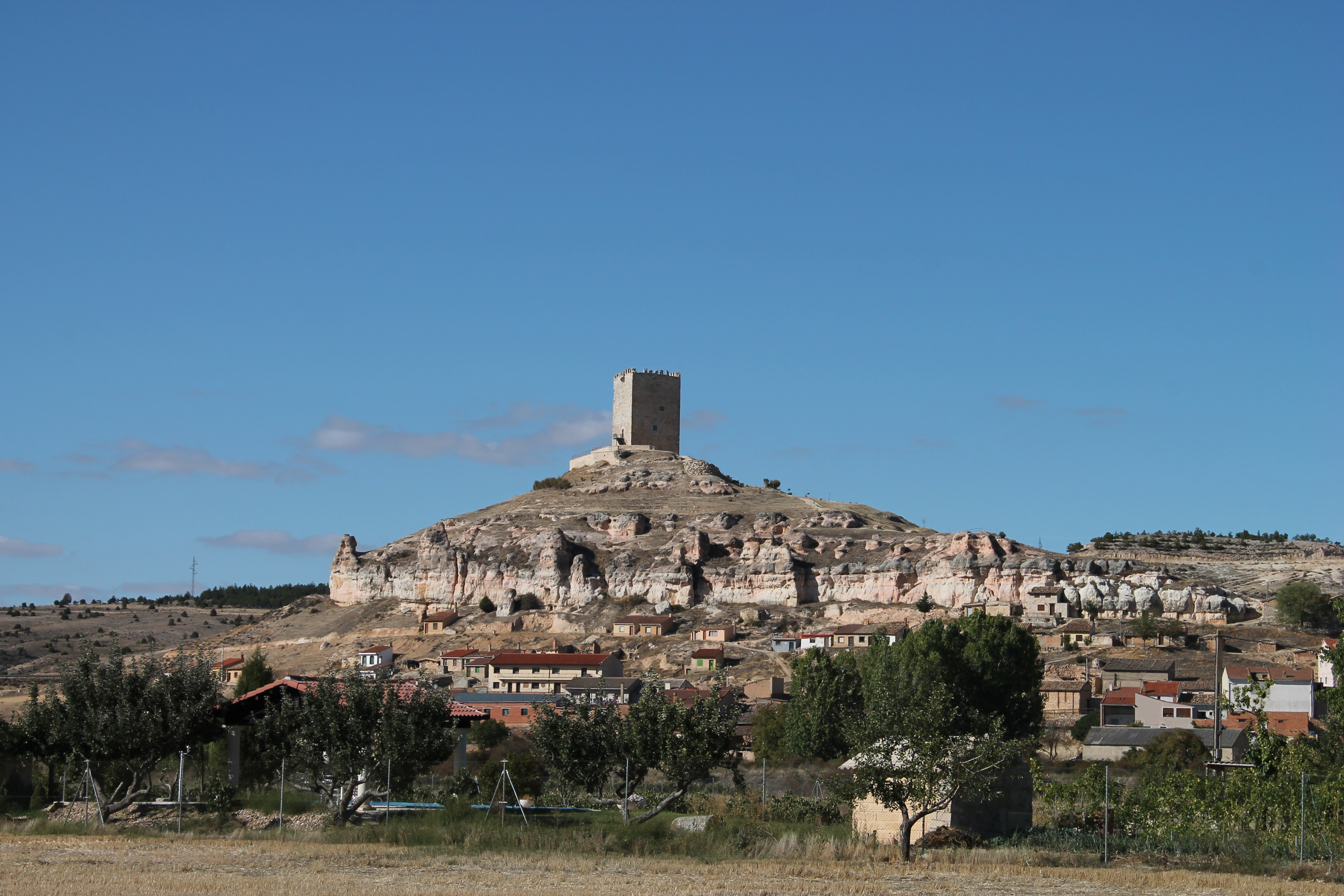
- View of Langa de Duero

- Flag Coat of arms

- Location in Spain. Langa de Duero (Spain)
- Coordinates: 41°36′36″N 3°24′05″W
- Country: Spain
- Autonomous community: Castile and León
- Province: Soria
- Municipality: Langa de Duero

Area
  - Total: 189.91 km^{2} (73.32 sq mi)

Population (2025-01-01)
  - Total: 696
  - Density: 3.66/km^{2} (9.49/sq mi)
- Time zone: UTC+1 (CET)
  - Summer (DST): UTC+2 (CEST)
- Website: Official website

Langa de Duero is a municipality located in the province of Soria, Castile and León, Spain. According to the 2004 census (INE), the municipality had a population of 867 inhabitants.
