= Pellendones =

Ancient pre-Roman Celtic people living on the Iberian Peninsula

The Iberian Peninsula in the 3rd century BC.

The Pellendones, also designated Pelendones Celtiberorum and Cerindones, were an ancient pre-Roman Celtiberian people living on the Iberian Peninsula. From the early 4th century BC they inhabited the region near the source of the river Duero in what today is north-central Spain, an area comprising the north of Soria, the southeast of Burgos and the southwest of La Rioja provinces.

== Origins ==
Possibly of mixed Illyrian and Celtic origin, the Pellendones migrated to the Iberian Peninsula around the 4th Century BC. Their original native name might have been *Kellendones, and is possible that they were related to the Gallic Belendi or Pelendi of the middle Sigmatis (today's Leyre) river valley (approximately today's Belin-Béliet territory) in Gallia (Gaul). They spoke a 'Q-Celtic' language.

== Culture ==
A predominantly stock-raising people that practiced transhumance in the grazing lowlands of the Ebro valley, the Pellendones are attributed to the Iron Age "Culture of the Soria hillforts" (Cultura de los castros sorianos) that flourished between the 6th and 4th centuries BC in the north of present-day Soria province.

Their capital was Visontium (Vinuesa – Soria), and are credited as being the original founders of Numantia (Muela de Garray – Soria) and Savia (Soria?). They also controlled the towns of Aregrada/Arekorata (Muro de Ágreda – Sória; Celtiberian mints: Areicoraticos/Arecorataz), Arenetum (Arnedo, near Inestrillas – La Rioja), Quelia/Quelium (Quel, near Arnedo – La Rioja; Celtiberian mint: Cueliocos) and Contrebia Leukade (Aguillar del Rio Alhama – La Rioja), although the location of Viscintium, Lutia (Cantalucia?), Olibia and Varia remains either incertain or unknown.

== History ==
Closely related with both the Arevaci – to whom they were a dependant tribe, though regarded as a separated people – and the Vettones, they threw off the Arevacian yoke possibly with Roman help in the late 2nd century BC, receiving the town of Numantia and respective lands when the Romans partitioned the territory of the defeated Arevaci amongst their neighbours. However, they lost these lands to the Uraci after supporting the ill-fated early 1st Century BC anti-Roman uprisings in Celtiberia (the 4th Celtiberian War). Later during the Sertorian Wars, they sided with Quintus Sertorius and provided auxiliary troops to his army. It remains unclear what role the Pellendones played during the period of unrest that rocked northern Celtiberia in 50-25 BC and in the subsequent Astur-Cantabrian Wars between 29-13 BC.

=== Romanization ===
In the late 1st Century BC, the Pellendones were aggregated to the new Hispania Tarraconensis province created by Emperor Augustus, who founded on the site of Arekorata the Roman colony of Augustobriga (Muro de Ágreda) in their territory.

== See also ==
- Celtiberian confederacy
- Celtiberian script
- Celtiberian Wars
- Illyrians
- Numantine War
- Pre-Roman peoples of the Iberian Peninsula

== Bibliography ==
- Ángel Montenegro et alii, Historia de España 2 - colonizaciones y formación de los pueblos prerromanos (1200-218 a.C), Editorial Gredos, Madrid (1989) ISBN 84-249-1386-8
- Francisco Burillo Mozota, Los Celtíberos, etnias y estados, Crítica, Barcelona (1998, revised edition 2007) ISBN 84-7423-891-9
- Leonard A Curchin (5 May 2004). The Romanization of Central Spain: Complexity, Diversity and Change in a Provincial Hinterland. Routledge. pp. 37–. ISBN 978-1-134-45112-8.
- M.ª de Lourdes Albertos Firmat, "La antroponimia prerromana de la Península Ibérica", in Actas del I Coloquio sobre Lenguas y Culturas Prerromanas de la Peninsula Iberica, Salamanca, pp. 57-86. (1976)

=== Further reading ===
- Juan Pedro Benito Batanero, Carlos Tabernero Galán, Alberto Sanz Aragonés & Ramón Guillén López, Pelendones – castros célticos en la serranía norte de Soria: guía arqueológica, Asopiva y Proynerso, Soria (2006) ISBN 9788473596121
