= Monreal de Ariza =

Coordinates: 41°18′N 2°06′W

- municipality
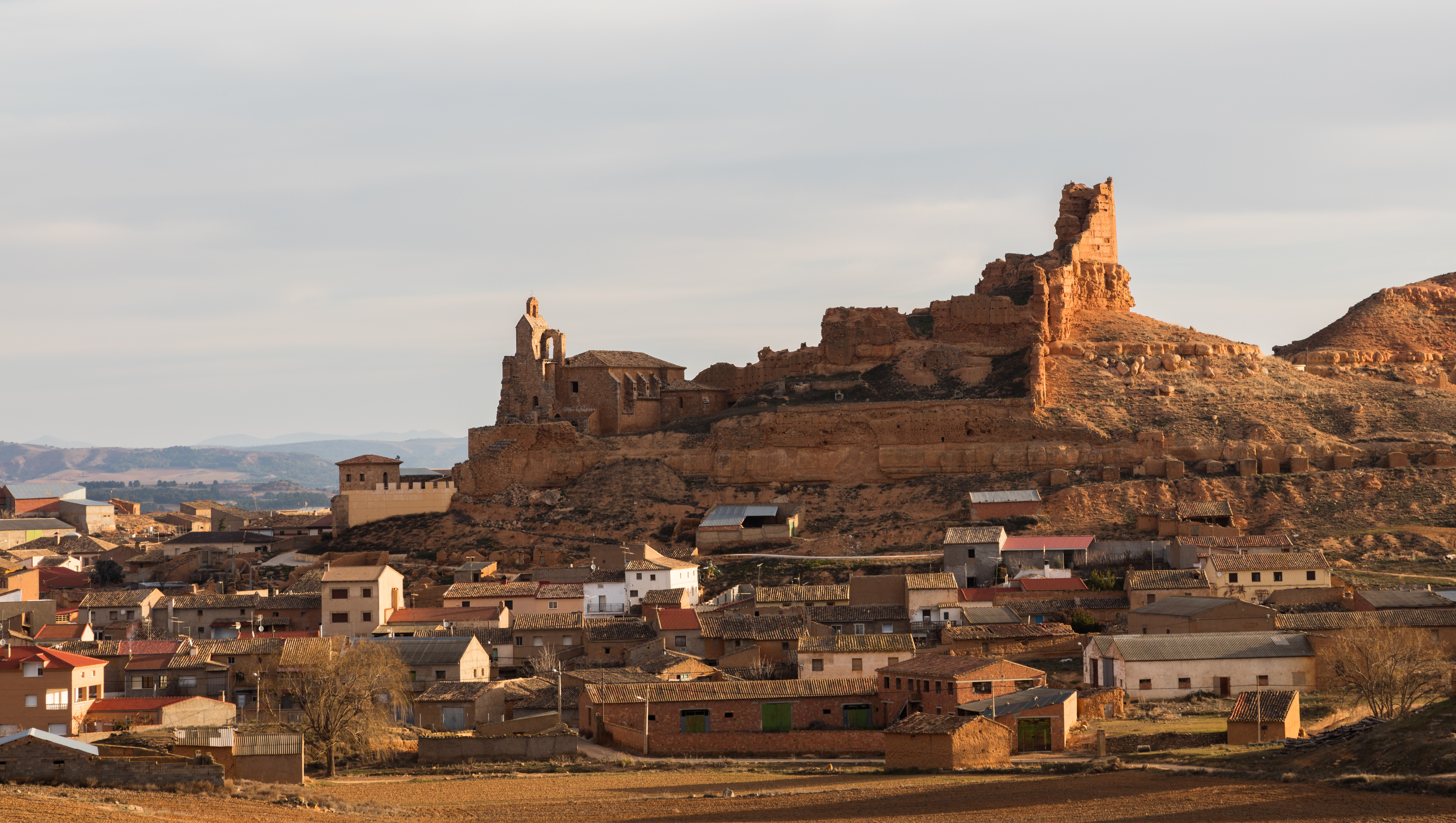

- Coat of arms
- Interactive map of Monreal de Ariza
- Country: Spain
- Autonomous community: Aragon
- Province: Zaragoza

Area
  - Total: 61 km^{2} (24 sq mi)

Population (2025-01-01)
  - Total: 175
  - Density: 2.9/km^{2} (7.4/sq mi)
- Time zone: UTC+1 (CET)
  - Summer (DST): UTC+2 (CEST)

Monreal de Ariza is a municipality located in the province of Zaragoza, Aragon, Spain. According to the 2004 census (INE), the municipality has a population of 257 inhabitants.

== See also ==
- List of municipalities in Zaragoza
