= Carpetania =

Ancient region of what is today Spain

Map of Carpetania

Carpetania was an ancient region of what is today Spain, located between the Sierra de Guadarrama, the mountains of Toledo, the river Guadiana and the mountain range of Alcaraz, including approximately, the present autonomous communities of Madrid and Castile-La Mancha.

It was the most fertile part of Spain, and its name may derive from the Greek karpos meaning fruit due to abundant cultivation of fruits in the region. It was inhabited by the Carpetani, a pre-Roman tribe. To the south dwelt the Oretani, on the northeast were Celtiberians whose tribes are not further specified. On the northwest to the Vaccei and Vettones. This area was easily conquered by the Romans and quickly integrated culturally and politically. Thus, it is practically unmentioned in the literature of the conquest. It retained a distinct cultural identity through the Visogothic period.

Its main urban nuclei (Toletum, corresponding to present Toledo; Complutum, the present Alcalá de Henares, Consabura, the present Consuegra, Segóbriga (Saelices, River basin) and Laminio acquired municipal legal statutes soon after the Roman conquest.

It has also been used in Geography to designate the Central System, the mountain range that separates the North Plateau of the South Plateau, although that use (Carpetovetónica Mountain range, by similarity with the Cantabrian Mountains range or the Iberian System) has nearly vanished.

== See also ==
- Raid of Carpetania
