= Numantine War =

Last of the Celtiberian Wars

- Part of the Celtiberian Wars
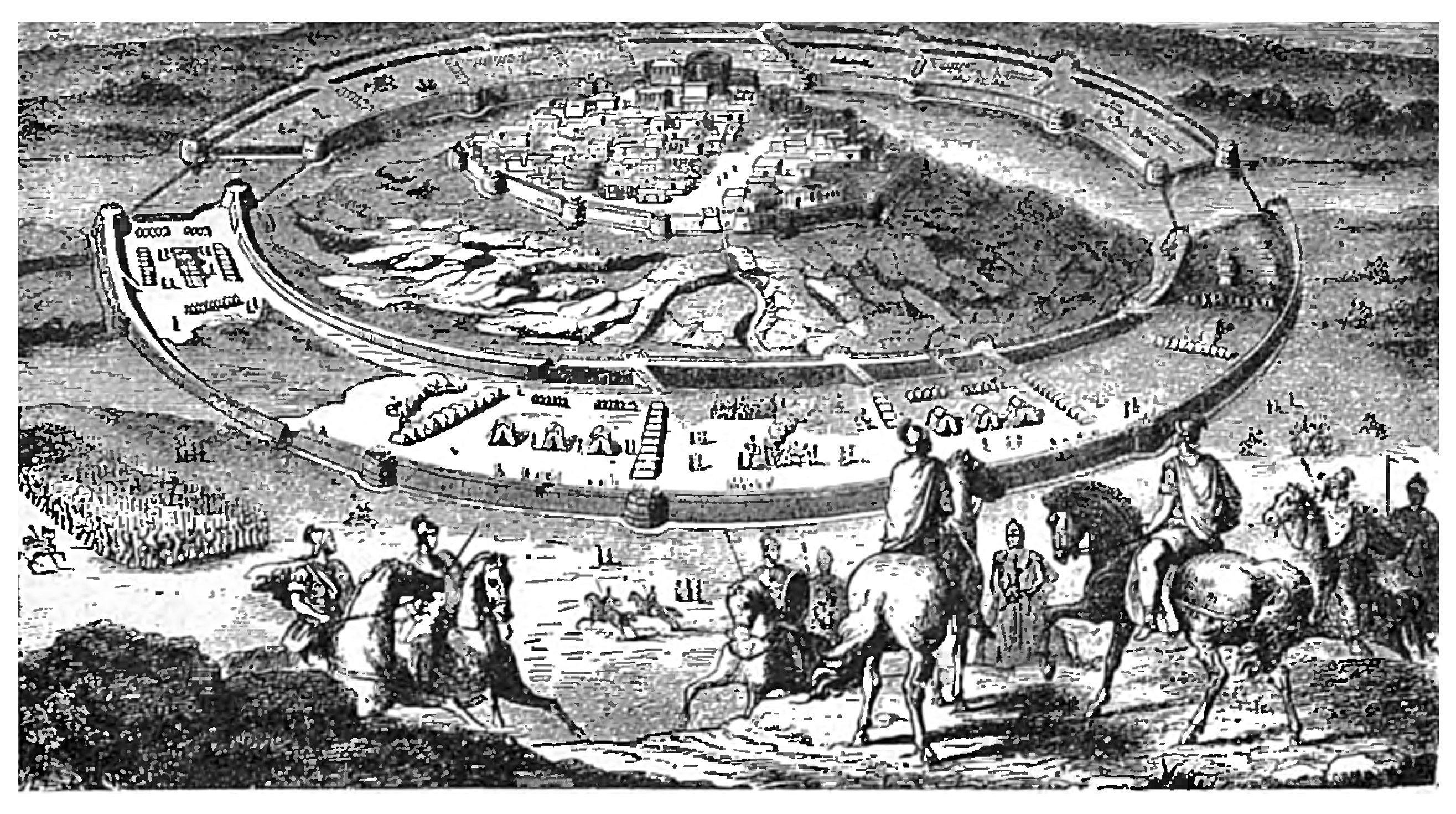
- Siege of Numantia
Date	143–133 BC
Location	Hispania
Result	Roman victory
Territorial changes	Expansion of the Roman territory through Celtiberia

Belligerents
Roman Republic; Kingdom of Numidia	Arevaci; Lusones; Vaccaei; Vettones

Commanders and leaders
Metellus Macedonicus; Quintus Pompeius; Marcus Popillius Laenas; Gaius Hostilius Mancinus; Scipio Aemilianus; Micipsa; Jugurtha	Avarus †; Litennon Attio; Tanginus; Caraunius

The Numantine War (from Bellum Numantinum in Appian's Roman History) was the last conflict of the Celtiberian Wars fought by the Romans to subdue those people along the Ebro, in what is now Spain. It was a twenty-year conflict between the Celtiberian tribes of Hispania Citerior and the Roman government. It began in 154 BC as a revolt of the Celtiberians of Numantia on the Douro. The first phase of the war ended in 151, but in 143, war flared up again with a new insurrection in Numantia.

The first war was fought contemporaneously with the Lusitanian War in Hispania Ulterior. The Lusitanians were subdued by Sulpicius Galba, who betrayed their surrender and executed their leading men, and the Arevaci of Hispania Citerior continued the war and allied with the Lusitanian leader Viriathus.

After open war reignited in 143, Rome sent a series of generals to the Iberian peninsula to deal with the Numantines. In that year, Quintus Caecilius Metellus Macedonicus tried and failed to take Numantia by siege, but subjugated all the other tribes of the Arevaci. His successor, Quintus Pompeius, was inept and suffered severe defeats at their hands, so he secretly negotiated a peace with the city abiding by the previous treaty. Yet in 138 BC a new general arrived, Marcus Pompillius Laenas, and when the Numantine envoys came to finish their obligations of the peace treaty, Pompeius disavowed negotiating any such peace. The matter was referred to the Senate for a judgment. Rome decided to ignore Pompeius' peace and sent Gaius Hostilius Mancinus to continue the war in 136 BC. He assaulted the city and was repulsed several times before being routed and encircled, and so forced to accept a treaty, negotiated by a young Tiberius Gracchus. The Senate did not ratify this treaty either but only sent Mancinus to the Numantines as a prisoner. His successors Lucius Furius Philus and Gaius Calpurnius Piso avoided conflict with the Numantines.

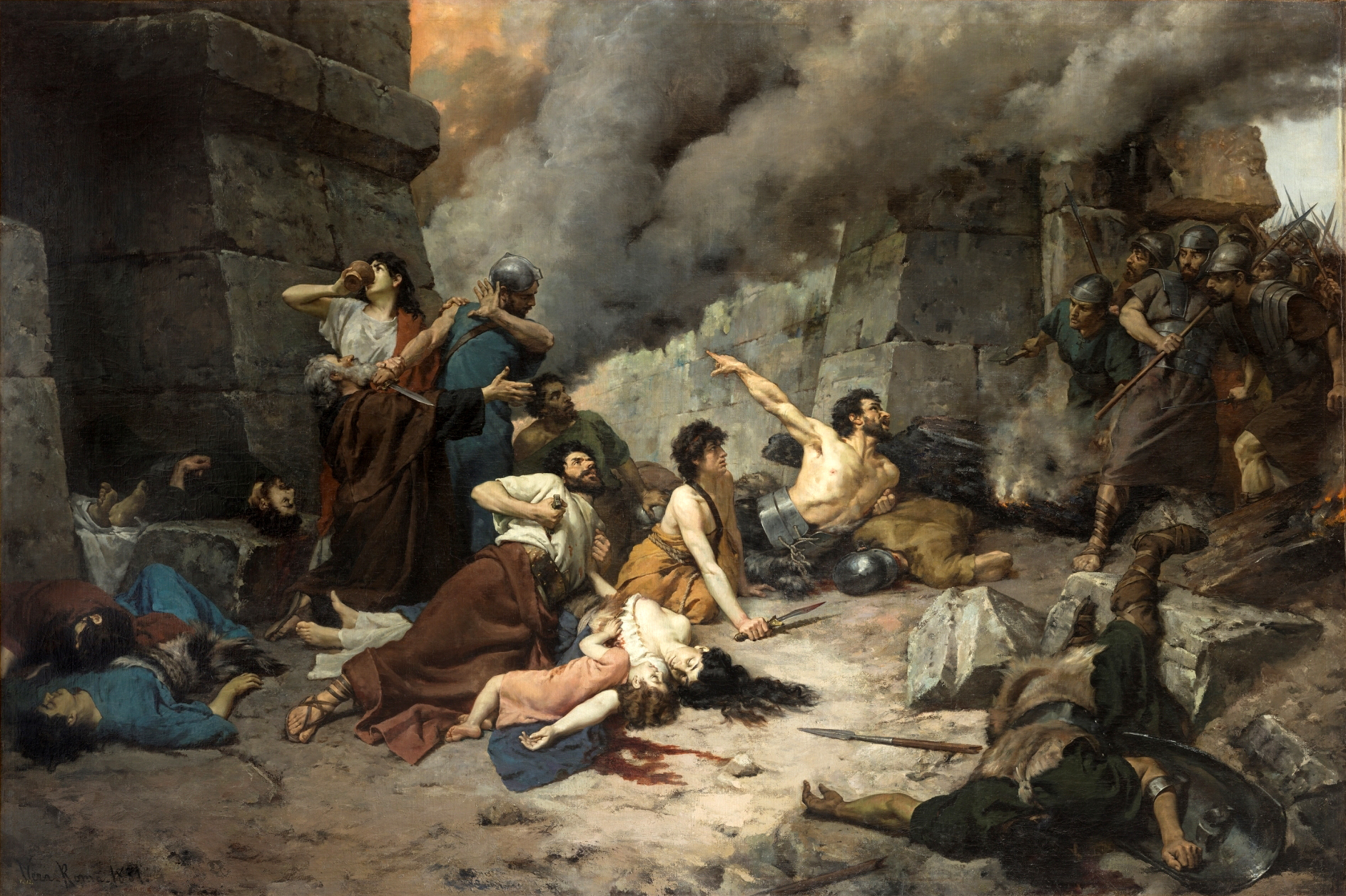
Siege of Numantia

In 134 BC, the Consul Scipio Aemilianus was sent to Hispania Citerior to end the war. He recruited 20,000 men and 40,000 allies, including Numidian cavalry and 12 war elephants under Jugurtha. Scipio built a ring of seven fortresses around Numantia itself before beginning the siege proper. After suffering pestilence and famine, most of the surviving Numantines committed suicide rather than surrender to Rome. The decisive Roman victory over Numantia ushered in an era of lasting peace in Hispania until the Sertorian War over half a century later.

This war also launched the careers of several important figures. Tiberius Gracchus was present as a quaestor during Mancinus's failed siege. Due to the reputation Gracchus's father had with the Numantines, Tiberius was selected to negotiate the treaty. Gaius Marius also fought in this war, as well as the later Roman enemy Jugurtha.

== Sources ==
- Davis, Paul K. Besieged: 100 Great Sieges from Jericho to Sarajevo. Oxford University Press, 2001.
- Wintle, Justin. The Rough Guide History of Spain. Rough Guides: Spain, 2003.
- Encyclopaedia Romana: The Celtiberian War and Numantia.
- Works by Theodor Mommsen at Project Gutenberg The History of Rome, Book IV
