= Edetani =

Pre-Roman people of the Iberian Peninsula

The Iberian Peninsula in the 3rd century BC

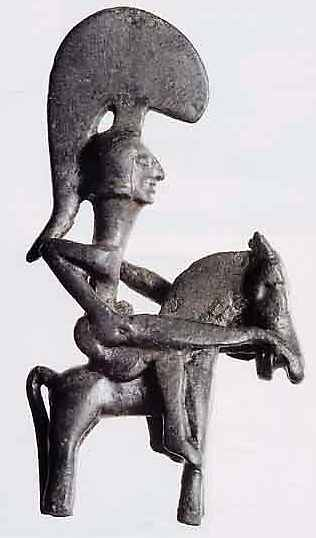
Bronze figure of the Guerrer de Moixent

The Edetani were an ancient Iberian (Pre-Roman) people of the Iberian Peninsula (the Roman Hispania). They are believed to have spoken a form of the Iberian language.

== See also ==
- Iberians
- Edeta
- Pre-Roman peoples of the Iberian Peninsula
- Puntal dels Llops

== Bibliography ==
- Ángel Montenegro et alii, Historia de España 2 - colonizaciones y formación de los pueblos prerromanos (1200-218 a.C), Editorial Gredos, Madrid (1989) ISBN 84-249-1386-8
- Francisco Burillo Mozota, Los Celtíberos, etnias y estados, Crítica, Grijalbo Mondadori, S.A., Barcelona (1998, revised edition 2007) ISBN 84-7423-891-9
