= Celtiberians =

Ancient Celtic peoples of the Iberian Peninsula

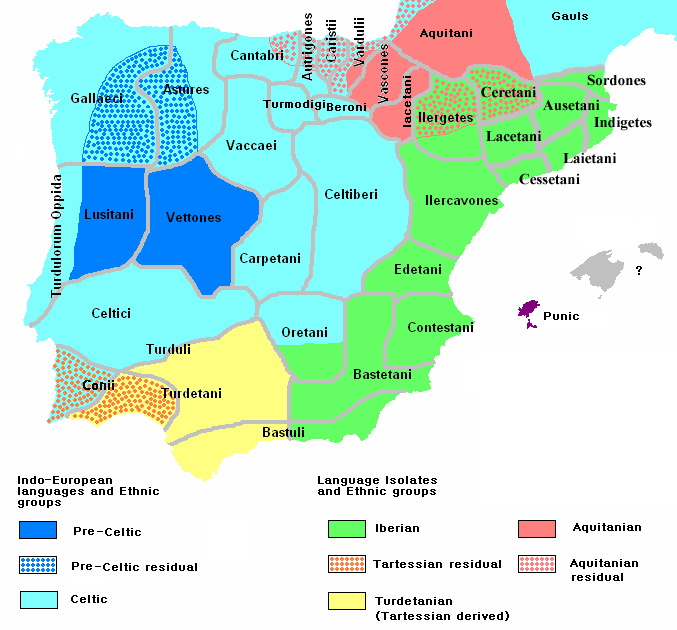
Ethnology of the Iberian Peninsula c. 200 BC, based on the map by Portuguese archeologist Luís Fraga da Silva

The Celtiberians were a group of Celts and Celticised peoples inhabiting an area in the central-northeastern Iberian Peninsula during the final centuries BC. They were explicitly mentioned as being Celts by several classic authors (e.g. Strabo). These tribes spoke the Celtiberian language and wrote it by adapting the Iberian alphabet, in the form of the Celtiberian script. The numerous inscriptions that have been discovered, some of them extensive, have enabled scholars to classify the Celtiberian language as a Celtic language, one of the Hispano-Celtic (also known as Iberian Celtic) languages that were spoken in pre-Roman and early Roman Iberia. Archaeologically, many elements link Celtiberians with Celts in Central Europe, but also show large differences with both the Hallstatt culture and La Tène culture.

There is no complete agreement on the exact definition of Celtiberians among classical authors, nor modern scholars. The Ebro river clearly divides the Celtiberian areas from non-Indo-European speaking peoples. In other directions, the demarcation is less clear. Most scholars include the Arevaci, Pellendones, Belli, Titti and Lusones as Celtiberian tribes, and occasionally the Berones, Vaccaei, Carpetani, Olcades or Lobetani.

In 195 BC, part of Celtiberia was conquered by the Romans, and by 72 BC the entire region had become part of the Roman province of Hispania Citerior. The subjugated Celtiberians waged a protracted struggle against the Roman conquerors, staging uprisings in 195–193 BC, 181–179 BC, 153–151 BC, and 143–133 BC. In 105 BC, Celtiberian warriors drove the Germanic Cimbri from Spain in the Cimbrian War (113–101 BC) and also played an important role in the Sertorian War (80–72 BC).

== Etymology ==
The term Celtiberi appears in accounts by Diodorus Siculus, Appian and Martial who recognised intermarriage between Celts and Iberians after a period of continuous warfare, though Barry Cunliffe says "this has the ring of guesswork about it." Strabo just saw the Celtiberians as a branch of the Celti. Pliny the Elder thought that the original home of the Celts in Iberia was the territory of the Celtici in the south-west, on the grounds of an identity of sacred rites, language, and the names of cities.

== History ==
=== Early history ===
Strabo cites Ephorus's belief that there were Celts in the Iberian peninsula as far as Cádiz.

Celtic presence in Iberia likely dates to as early as the 6th century BC, when the castros evinced a new permanence with stone walls and protective ditches. Archaeologists Martín Almagro Gorbea and Alberto José Lorrio Alvarado recognise the distinguishing iron tools and extended family social structure of developed Celtiberian culture as evolving from the archaic castro culture which they consider "proto-Celtic".

Archaeological finds identify the culture as continuous with the culture reported by Classical writers from the late 3rd century onwards (Almagro-Gorbea and Lorrio). The ethnic map of Celtiberia was highly localised however, composed of different tribes and nations from the 3rd century centered upon fortified oppida and representing a wide-ranging degree of local assimilation with the autochthonous cultures in a mixed Celtic and Iberian stock.

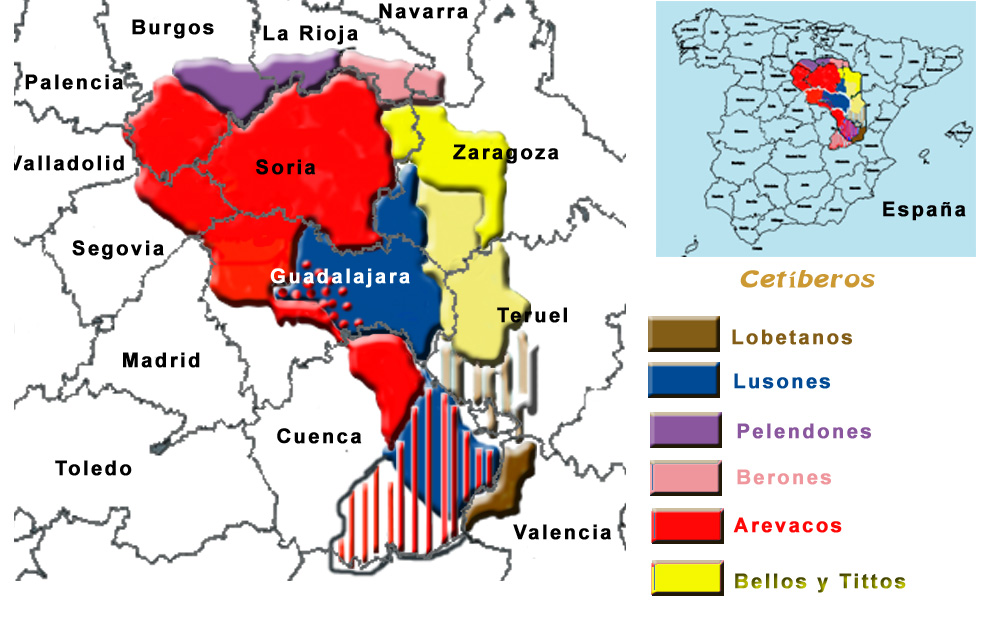
Territory of the Celtiberi with possible location of tribes

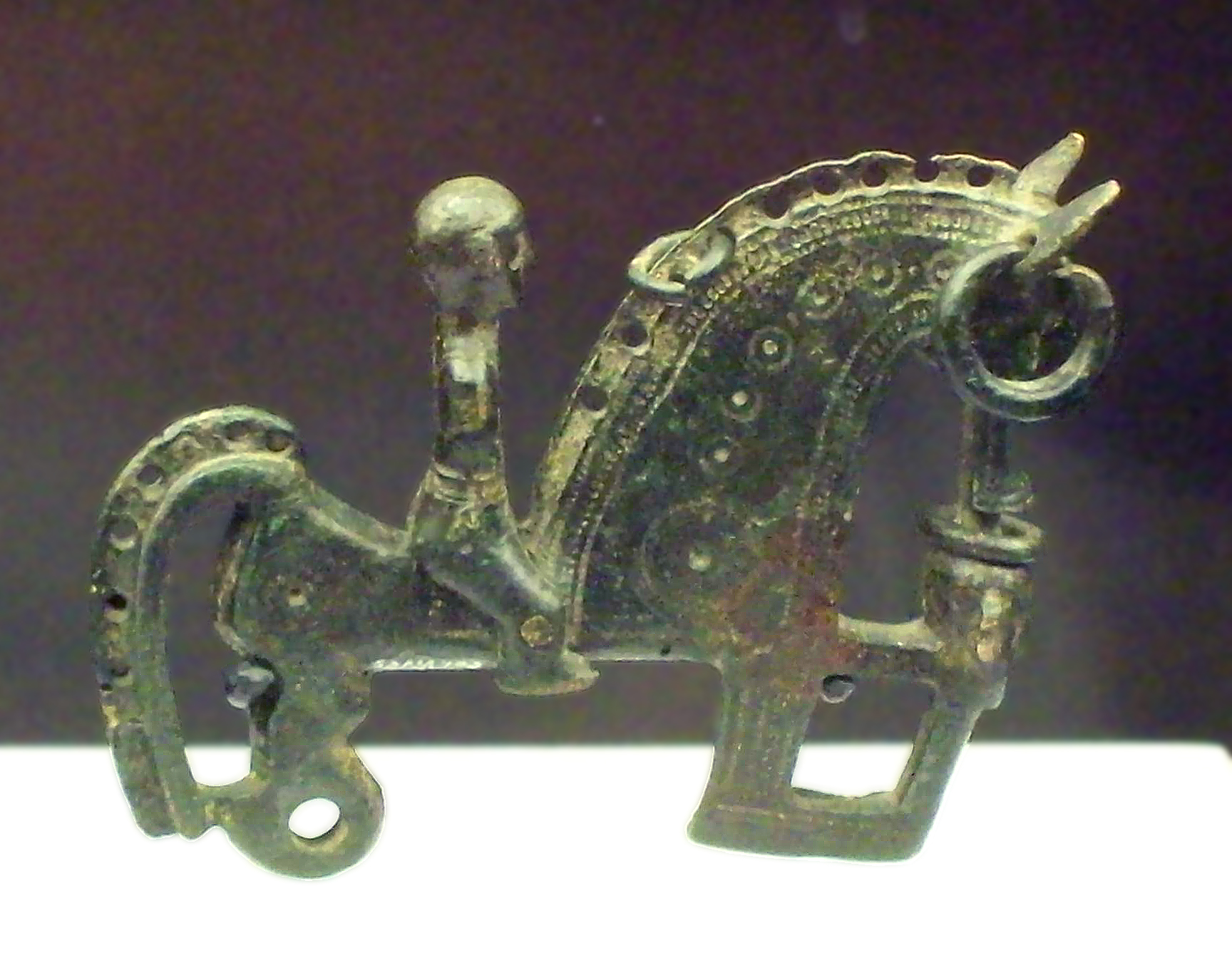
Bronze Celtiberian fibula representing a warrior (3rd–2nd century BC)

The cultural stronghold of Celtiberians was the northern area of the central meseta in the upper valleys of the Tagus and Douro east to the Iberus (Ebro) river, in the modern provinces of Soria, Guadalajara, Zaragoza and Teruel. There, when Greek and Roman geographers and historians encountered them, the established Celtiberians were controlled by a military aristocracy that had become a hereditary elite. The dominant tribe were the Arevaci, who dominated their neighbors from powerful strongholds at Okilis (Medinaceli) and who rallied the long Celtiberian resistance to Rome. Other Celtiberians were the Belli and Titti in the Jalón valley, and the Lusones to the east.

Excavations at the Celtiberian strongholds Kontebakom-Bel Botorrita, Sekaisa Segeda, Termantia complement the grave goods found in Celtiberian cemeteries, where aristocratic tombs of the 6th to 5th centuries BC give way to warrior tombs with a tendency from the 3rd century BC for weapons to disappear from grave goods, either indicating an increased urgency for their distribution among living fighters or, as Almagro-Gorbea and Lorrio think, the increased urbanisation of Celtiberian society. Many late Celtiberian oppida are still occupied by modern towns, inhibiting archaeology.

Metalwork stands out in Celtiberian archaeological finds, partly from its indestructible nature, emphasising Celtiberian articles of warlike uses, horse trappings and prestige weapons. The two-edged sword adopted by the Romans was previously in use among the Celtiberians, and Latin lancea, a thrown spear, was a Hispanic word, according to Varro. Celtiberian culture was increasingly influenced by Rome in the two final centuries BC.

"The Celtiberians excel the rest of the world in the construction of their swords; for their point is strong and serviceable, they can deliver a cut with both edges. Wherefore the Romans abandoned their traditional swords after the Hannibalian War and adopted those of the Iberians. They adopted, I say, the construction of the swords, but they can, by no means, imitate the excellence of the steel or the other points in which they are elaborately finished."

— Polybius, 22.96

From the 3rd century, the clan was superseded as the basic Celtiberian political unit by the oppidum, a fortified organised city with a defined territory that included the castros as subsidiary settlements. These civitates, as the Roman historians called them, could make and break alliances, as surviving inscribed hospitality pacts attest, and minted coinage. The old clan structures lasted in the formation of the Celtiberian armies, organised along clan-structure lines, with consequent losses of strategic and tactical control.

=== Late period ===
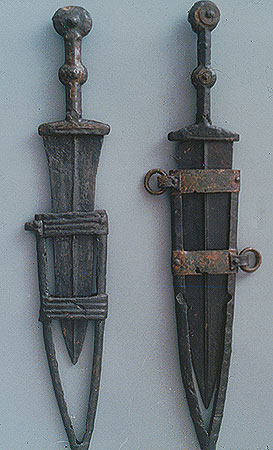
Celtiberian biglobular daggers

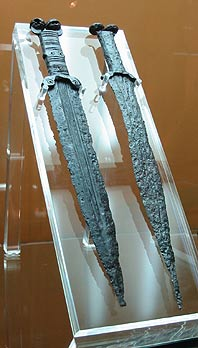
Celtiberian antennas swords

The Celtiberians were the most influential ethnic group in Iberia when the Mediterranean powers (Carthage and Rome) started their conquests. In 220 BC, the Punic army was attacked when preparing to cross the Tagus river by a coalition of Vaccei, Carpetani and Olcades. Despite these clashes, during the Second Punic War the Celtiberians served most often as allies or mercenaries of Carthage in its conflict with Rome, and crossed the Alps in the mixed forces under Hannibal's command. Under Scipio Africanus, the Romans were able to secure alliances and change the allegiances of many Celtiberian tribes, using these allied warriors against the Carthaginian forces and allies in Spain. After the conflict, Rome took possession of the Punic empire in Spain, and some Celtiberians soon challenged the new dominant power that loomed in the borders of its territory. Tiberius Sempronius Gracchus spent the years 182 to 179 pacifying the Celtiberians. Gracchus boasted of destroying over 300 Celtiberian settlements.

In 155 BC, a raid into Hispania Ulterior (Farther Spain) by the Lusitani and the defeat of two successive Roman praetors encouraged the town of Segeda in Hispania Citerior (Nearer Spain) to rebel. The following year, it refused to pay tribute or provide a military contingent to Rome but formed instead a confederacy with neighboring towns and began the construction of a defensive wall. Quintus Fulvius Nobilior was sent against the Celtiberians in 153 BC, with nearly 30,000 men. But the consul was late in arriving and ambushed soon after, with 6,000 Romans slain. A siege of Numantia several days later, where the Segedans had taken refuge, was no more successful. Three elephants were brought up against the town walls but became frightened and turned on the Romans, who retreated in confusion. There were other setbacks, and the hapless Nobilior was obliged to withdraw to camp, where more men suffered frostbite and died of the winter cold. Nobilior lost over 10,000 men in his campaign. In 137 BC, the Celtiberians forced the surrender of a 20,000-man Roman consular army led by Gaius Hostilius Mancinus. In 134 BC, the consul Scipio Aemilianus took charge of the demoralised Roman troops in Spain and laid siege to Numantia.

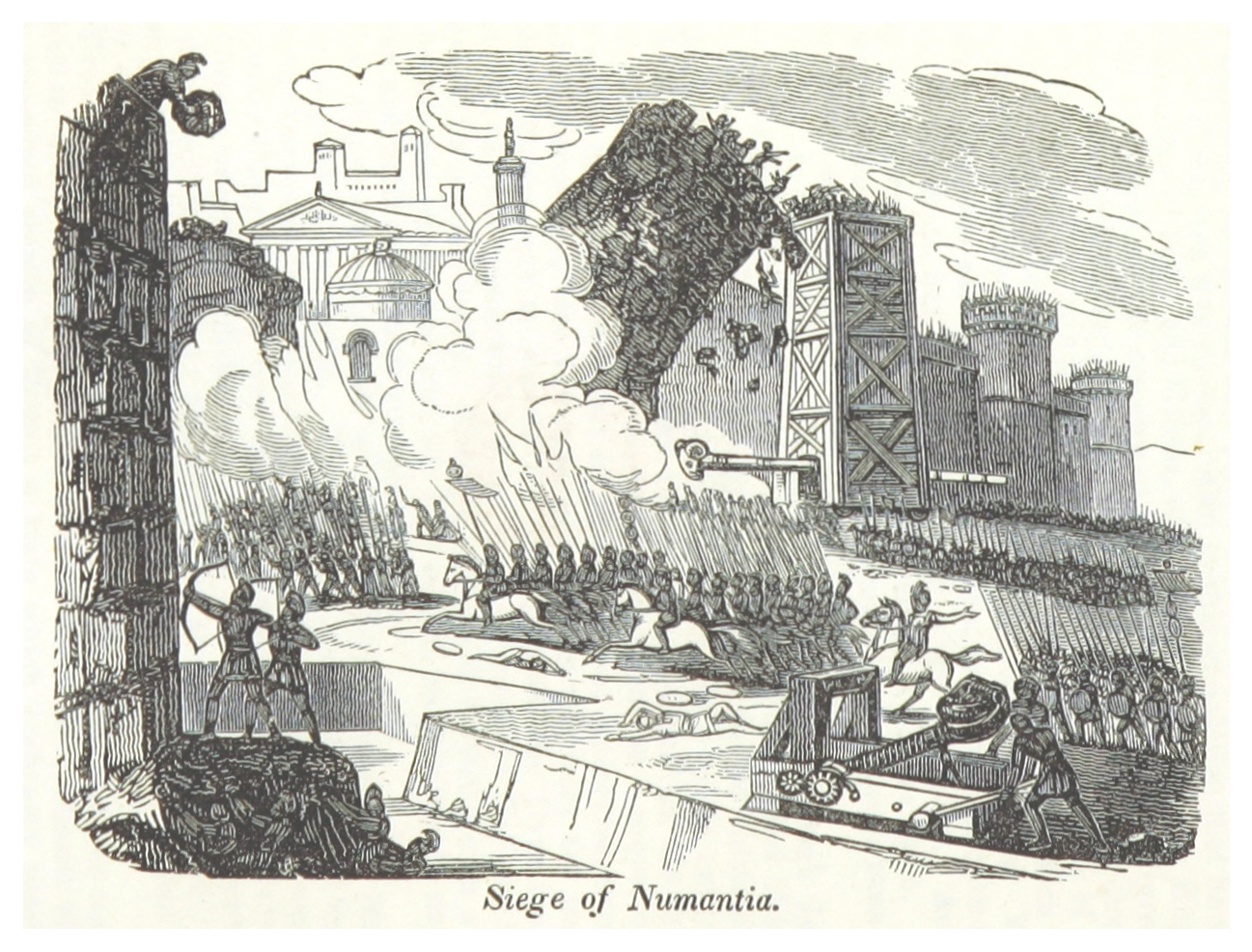
Engraving of the Siege of Numantia

Nearby fields were laid waste and what was not used burned. The stronghold of Numantia then was circumvallated with a ditch and palisade, behind which was a wall ten feet high. Towers were placed every hundred feet and mounted with catapults and ballistae. To blockade the nearby river, logs were placed in the water, moored by ropes on the shore. Knives and spear heads were embedded in the wood, which rotated in the strong current. Allied tribes were ordered to send reinforcements. Even Jugurtha, who later would revolt from Rome, himself, was sent from Numidia with twelve war elephants. The Roman forces now numbered 60,000 men and were arrayed around the besieged town in seven camps. The Numantines, "ready though they were to die, no opportunity was given them of fighting".

There were several desperate attempts to break out but they were repulsed. Nor could there be any help from neighboring towns. Eventually, as their hunger increased, envoys were sent to Scipio, asking if they would be treated with moderation if they surrendered, pleading that they had fought for their women and children, and the freedom of their country. But Scipio would accept only deditio (surrender). Hearing this demand for absolute submission, the Numantines, "who were previously savage in temper because of their absolute freedom and quite unaccustomed to obey the orders of others, and were now wilder than ever and beside themselves by reason of their hardships," slew their own ambassadors.

After eight months, the starving population was reduced to cannibalism and, filthy and foul smelling, compelled to surrender. But, "such was the love of liberty and of valour which existed in this small barbarian town," relates Appian, that many chose to kill themselves rather than capitulate. Families poisoned themselves, weapons were burned, and the beleaguered town set ablaze. There had been only about 8,000 fighting men when the war began; half that number survived to garrison Numantia. Only a pitiable few survived to walk in Scipio's triumph. The others were sold as slaves and the town razed to the ground, the territory divided among its neighbors.

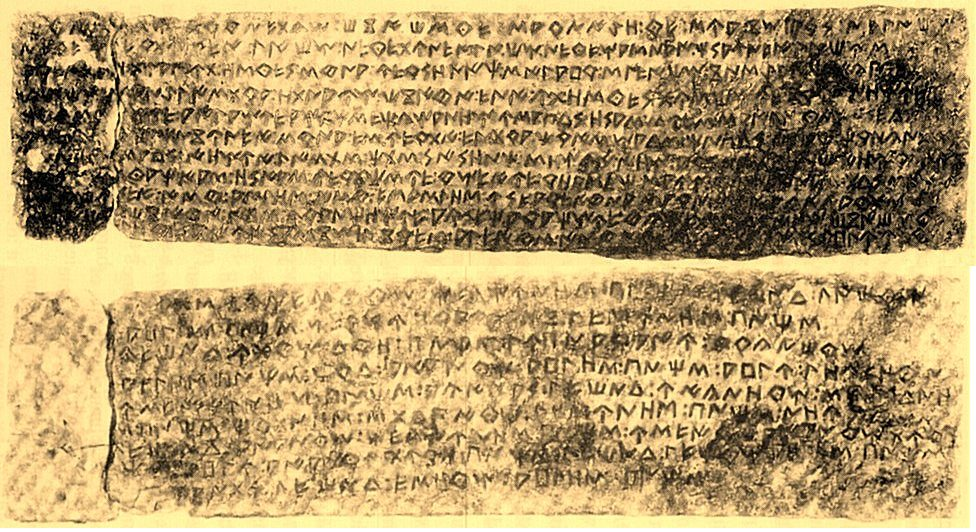
Botorrita plaque: one of four bronze plates with inscriptions.

After Numantia was finally taken and destroyed, Roman cultural influences increased; this is the period of the earliest Botorrita inscribed plaque; later plaques, significantly, are inscribed in Latin. The Sertorian War (80–72 BC) marked the last formal resistance of the Celtiberian cities to Roman domination, which submerged the Celtiberian culture.

The Celtiberian presence remains on the map of Spain in hundreds of Celtic place-names. The archaeological recovery of Celtiberian culture commenced with the excavations of Numantia, published between 1914 and 1931.

A Roman army auxiliary unit, the Cohors I Celtiberorum, is known from Britain, attested by 2nd century AD discharge diplomas.

== Genetics ==
In a March 2019 genetic study published in Science, three Celtiberians buried at La Hoya, Alava (in Beron territory) between 400 BC and 195 BC were examined. They had high levels of north-central European ancestry compared to non-Celtic populations of Iberia. One of the males examined was found to be a carrier of the paternal haplogroup I2a1a1a.

== See also ==
- Pre-Roman peoples of the Iberian Peninsula
- Gallaeci
