= Hispania Citerior =

Roman province in Hispania during the Roman Republic

- Province of the Roman Republic
- 197 BC–19 BC
- First provincial division of Roman Hispania
- Capital: Carthago Nova
- Historical era: Antiquity
  - Established: 197 BC
  - Disestablished: 19 BC
| Succeeded by |
| Hispania Tarraconensis |
- Today part of: Spain

Hispania Citerior (English: "Hither Iberia", or "Nearer Iberia") was a Roman province in Hispania during the Roman Republic. It was on the eastern coast of Iberia down to the town of Cartago Nova, today's Cartagena in the autonomous community of Murcia, Spain. It roughly covered today's Spanish autonomous communities of Catalonia and Valencia. Further south was the Roman province of Hispania Ulterior ("Further Spain" or "Further Iberia"), named as such because it was further away from Rome.

The two provinces were established in 197 BC, four years after the end of the Second Punic War (218–201 BC). During this war Scipio Africanus defeated the Carthaginians at the Battle of Ilipa (near Seville) in 206 BC. This led to the Romans taking over the Carthaginian possessions in southern Spain and on the east coast up to the River Ebro. Several governors of Hispania Citerior commanded wars against the Celtiberians who lived to the west of this province. In the late first century BC Augustus reorganised the Roman provinces in Hispania. Hispania Citerior was replaced by the larger province of Hispania Tarraconensis, which included the territories the Romans had subsequently conquered in central, northern and north-western Hispania. Augustus also renamed Hispania Ulterior as Hispania Baetica and created a third province, Hispania Lusitania.

== Etymology ==
Hispania is the Latin term given to the Iberian Peninsula. The term can be traced back to at least 200 BC, when it was used by the poet Quintus Ennius. The word is possibly derived from the Punic: 𐤀𐤉𐤔𐤐𐤍, romanized: *ʔī šapan, meaning "coast of rock hyraxes", in turn a misidentification on the part of Phoenician explorers of its numerous European rabbits as hyraxes. According to the Roman historian Cassius Dio, the people of the region came from many different tribes and did not share a common language or a common government.

== See also ==
- Hispania Baetica
- Hispania Lusitana
- Hispania Tarraconensis
- Hispania Ulterior
- Pre-Roman peoples of the Iberian Peninsula
