= Mesa de Ocaña =

Coordinates: 39°55′29″N 3°31′39″W

- Comarca
- Flag Coat of arms
- Country: Spain
- Autonomous community: Castilla-La Mancha
- Province: Toledo
- Capital: Ocaña
- Municipalities: List: Ocaña, Santa Cruz de la Zarza, Yepes, Noblejas, Ontígola, Villarrubia de Santiago, Villatobas, Villasequilla, Dosbarrios, La Guardia, Huerta de Valdecarábanos, Ciruelos, Cabañas de Yepes

Area
  - Total: 1,454 km^{2} (561 sq mi)

Population
  - Total: 39,175
  - Density: 26.94/km^{2} (69.78/sq mi)
- Time zone: UTC+1 (CET)
  - Summer (DST): UTC+2 (CEST)
- Largest municipality: Santa Cruz de la Zarza

Mesa de Ocaña is a comarca in Castilla-La Mancha, Spain, in the province of Toledo. Its capital and administrative center is Ocaña. The comarca is located in the northeast part of the province, and encompasses an area that includes several hundred meters of the Tajo River Valley.

The comarca is bordered on the North by Aranjuez (Las Vegas); to the south by Los Yébenes and the Mancha Alta de Toledo (comarca) comarca; to the West by La Sagra and Toledo; and to the East by the Mancha Alta de Toledo and La Mancha de Cuenca (comarca).

== Geography ==
=== Geomorphology ===
The altitude changes radically through the region. The height differences between the escarpments of the banks of the Tajo river to the North versus the steppes of La Guardia, and between the valleys and ravines of the Algodor River to the West and those of the Cedrón River to the East, have given rise the region's nickname of "the staircase." The area has a very distinct and unique set of geological formations which set it apart from its neighbors.

=== Location ===
The comarca consists of 1,453.49 km^{2}, and contains the following municipalities: Cabañas de Yepes (17.97 km^{2}), Ciruelos(22.94 km^{2}), Dosbarrios (111.59 km^{2}), La Guardia (195.59 km^{2}), Huerta de Valdecarábanos (83.00 km^{2}), Noblejas (69.67 km^{2}), Ocaña (147.91 km^{2}), Ontígola (41.49 km^{2}), Santa Cruz de la Zarza (264.54 km^{2}), Villarrubia de Santiago (155.29 km^{2}), Villasequilla (76.95 km^{2}), Villatobas (181.58 km^{2}), and Yepes (84.97 km^{2}).

=== Climate ===
The comarca's climate can be considered continental mediterranean due to its extreme temperatures. Average summer temperatures are over 26 °C, while winters average less than 6 °C.

== Demographics ==
According to the Instituto Nacional de Estadística in 2007, the population of the comarca is 39,175, with an average population density of 26.94 people/km^{2}.

The capital of the comarca is Ocaña.

== Cultural Heritage ==
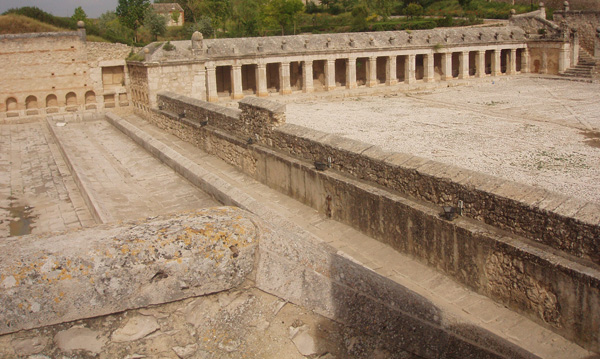
The great fountain in Ocaña.

Mesa de Ocaña has a rich cultural and architectural heritage, not to mention the area's many archeological treasures which document the lives of various different cultures who settled the area throughout the centuries.

One of the most spectacular of these architectural treasures is the "Plaza de Moros" in Villatobas, an Iron Age village whose walls are covered in murals. The ancient town of Ocaña itself is considered a historical monument in and of itself. The town of Yepes was an ecclesiastical dominion during the rule of the archbishop of Toledo, and is now a historical and artistic monument.

The towns which make up the comarca share two common characteristics: a plethora of religious architecture and the remains of ancient medieval fortifications. The many religious buildings -- churches, monasteries, convents, and hermitages—are reminders of bygone days of military orders and ecclesiastical dominions. Old defensive buildings include castles in Ontígola and Dosbarrios, the ruins of the castle in Valdecarábanos, and the fortress in La Guardia.

== Handicrafts ==
The local handicrafts are very traditional and varied. These include pottery, a legacy of the Moors, which is popular in Ocaña, Villarrubia de Santiago, Santa Cruz de la Zarza, and Villamuelas. Ironwork, carpentry, wickerwork, basketweaving, cooperage and crafting with glass and ebony, along with the production of wineskins are all popular traditional trades.

== Cuisine ==
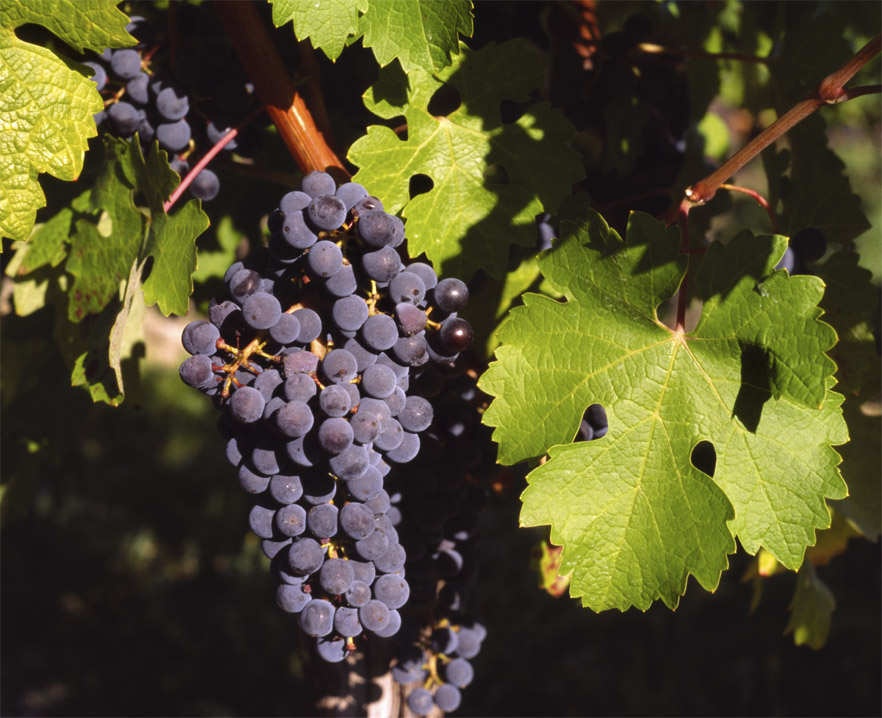
Cabernet Sauvignon grapes.

The cuisine of Mesa de Ocaña is typical of Castilla-La Mancha, with many game-based dishes, especially partridge. Other traditional dishes include various types of roasts, lamb stew, gachas, migas, atascaburras, hare, and cuchifritos.

Popular desserts include a wide range of sweets and pastries, including mantecados, puff pastries, and borrachos de Ocaña (literally "the drunks of Ocaña").

In terms of wine, the comarca is a part of the Denominación de Origen La Mancha, and its wineries enjoy the same international acclaim as those of Mancha Alta. The most-developed winemaking municipalities include Villamuelas, Ocaña, Yepes, Villarrubia de Santiago, Santa Cruz de la Zarza, and Noblejas. Some of these municipalities are considered part of the Denominación de Origen Uclés.

These wines tend to be made of Airén, Viura, Macabeo, Tempranillo, Cencibel, Cabernet Sauvignon, or combinations of these.

== Monuments and Places of Interest ==
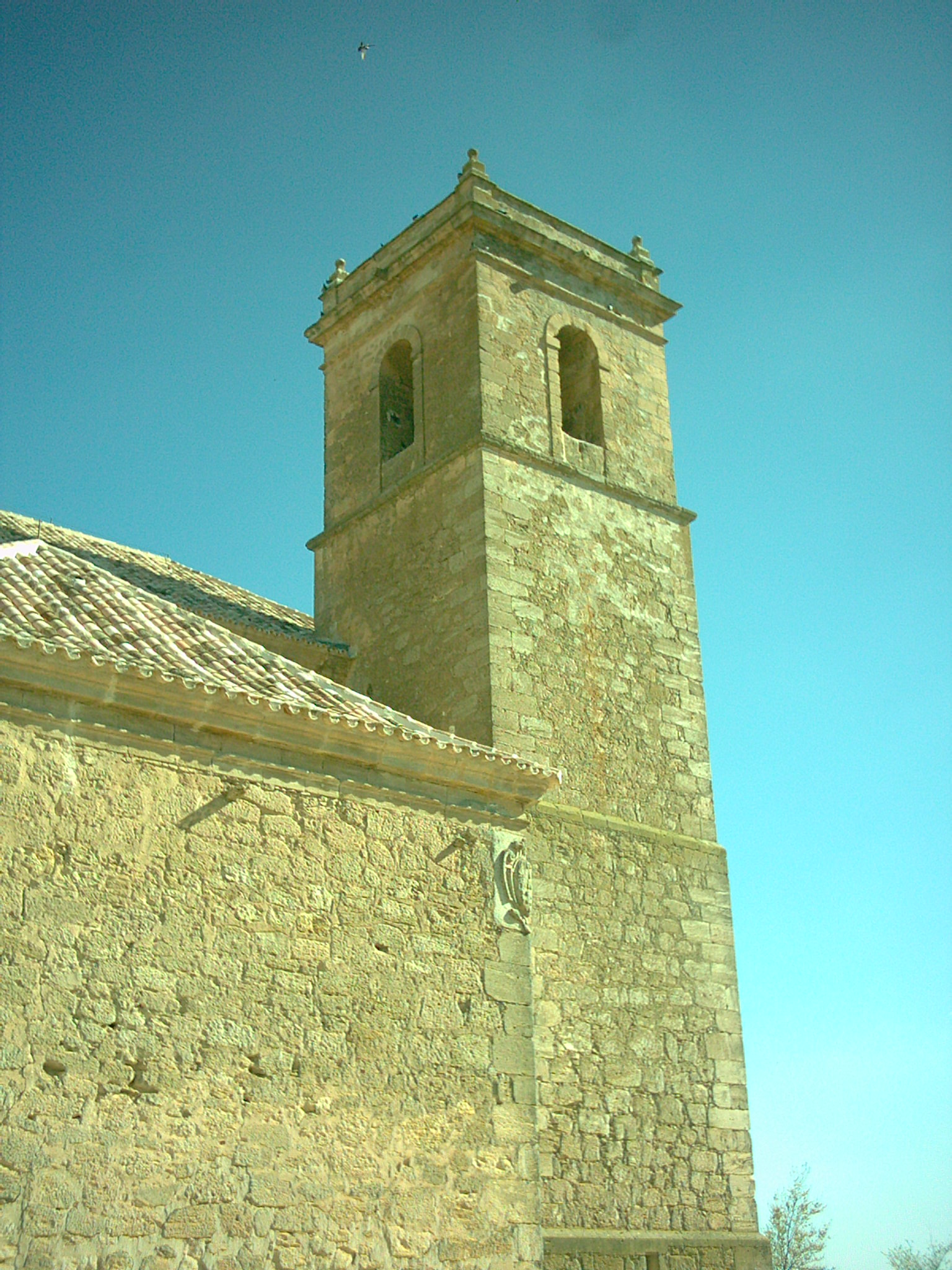
Church of St. James in Santa Cruz de la Zarza.

Ocaña: the Plaza Mayor, the Palace of the Cárdenas, the Great Fountain, and the Dominican Convent, all of which are registered National Monuments.

Santa Cruz de la Zarza: Church of St. James, Church of St. Michael the Archangel, Convent of the Trinitarian Order, Casa del Gallo, Casa de Chacón, Plaza Mayor, Casa de las Cadenas, Casa de la Tercia, Fountain of the Caños.

Yepes: a declared historic-artistic area, with ancient walls, the Plaza Mayor, and the Church of San Benito Abad.

Villatobas: "Plaza de Moros" archeological site, Shrine of Jesus the Nazarean.

Lillo: the Longar, Altillo, and Albardiosa Lakes, the Don Quixote de la Mancha Aerodrome, and the San Pedro Bautista hospice.

Noblejas: Traditional bodegas and almazaras (mills for making olive oil).

Villarrubia de Santiago: Church of St. Bartholomew, Castellar Hermitage, archeological site of Hoyo de la Serna.

La Guardia: Hermitage of the Holy Child, Church of the Assumption, prehistoric cave dwellings.
