= Carpetani =

Celtic tribe in ancient Iberia

The Iberian Peninsula in the 3rd century BC

The Carpetani (Greek: Karpetanoi), also named Karpesioi by Polybius, were one of the Celtic peoples inhabiting the Iberian Peninsula prior to the Roman conquest. Their core domain was constituted by the lands between the Tagus and the Anas, in the southern Meseta. Agriculture is thought to have had a greater importance in the Carpetanian economy than other neighboring peoples'.

== Location ==
From the 5th century BC the Carpetani inhabited the Toledo and Alcaraz highland ranges along the middle Tagus basin, occupying a territory that stretched from the Guadarrama river in the north to the upper Anas (Guadiana) in the modern provinces of Guadalajara, Toledo, Madrid and Ciudad Real, an area designated as Carpetania (or Karpesia) in the ancient sources.

Main city-states (Civitates) in the region were Toletum (near modern Toledo; Roman or Celtiberian-type mint: Tole), Iplacea/Complutum (Alcalá de Henares – Madrid; Celtiberian-type mint: Ikezancom Konbouto?), Titulcia (El Cerrón, near modern Titulcia – Madrid), Consabura (Consuegra – Toledo), Metercosa/Mentercosa (Turleque – Toledo), Barnacis (Orgaz – Ciudad Real; Celtiberian-type mint: Bornaiscom), Laminium (either Argamasilla de Alba or Alhambra – Ciudad Real), and Alce (Campo de Criptana – Ciudad Real) and Certima (El Cerro de la Virgen, near Campo de Criptana – Ciudad Real). Towns of lesser importance were Aebura (Cuerva – Toledo), Rigusa (Madridejos – Toledo), Ispinum (Yepes – Toledo), Miaccum (Casa de Campo – Madrid), Egelesta (Villaviciosa de Odón – Madrid), Mantua (Villamanta – Madrid), Thermida (Trillo – Guadalajara), Ilarcuris (Alarcos – Ciudad Real), Arriaca (Guadalajara), Caracca/Characa (Cerro de la Virgen de La Muela, near Driebes – Guadalajara), Ilurbida (either Lorvigo, near Talavera de la Reina or La Puebla de Montalbán – Toledo), Paterniana (Los Yébenes – Toledo), Alternia (sited between Villanueva de Bogas and Mora – Toledo), Vicus Cuminarius (Santa Cruz de la Zarza – Toledo) and Varada (La Guardia – Toledo).

The exact location of the remaining Carpetanian towns is either uncertain or unknown, this is true in the cases of Dipo (near Toledo?) and Libora.

== Origins ==
The origins of the Carpetani are obscure though their ruling elite certainly had Celtiberian and Gallic-Belgae elements, whose ancestors arrived in the Peninsula in the wake of the Celtic migration of the 4th century BC; the rest of the population was clearly Indo-European and very mixed, including people of native Ibero-Tartessian and Indo-Aryan affiliation. Recent analysis of local epigraphic sources revealed that the Carpetani comprised some twenty-seven tribes, namely the Aelariques, Aeturiques, Arquioci, Acualiques, Bocouriques, Canbarici, Contucianci, Dagencii, Doviliques, Duitiques, Duniques, Elguismiques, Langioci, Longeidoci, Maganiques, Malugeniques, Manuciques, Maureici, Mesici, Metturici, Moenicci, Obisodiques, Pilonicori, Solici, Tirtaliques, Uloques, and Venatioques.

== Culture ==
In archeological terms, it is now believed that they stemmed from both the transitional Late Bronze Age/early Iron Age 'Campiñas de Madrid' farmers' and the 'Cogotas I' cultural groups.

Only a few Carpetanian towns appear to have issued their own currency, modelled after Roman patterns copied directly or adapted via Celtiberian coinage. In the 2nd century BC, Iplacea/Complutum and Barnacis struck coins with their names marked in Celtiberian script, whilst later Toletum struck theirs bearing its name in Latin script.

== History ==
By the later part of the 3rd century BC, the Carpetani had evolved into a sort of federation or loose tribal confederacy whose nominal capital was set at Toletum, with several centres of power in the main towns ruled by petty kings (Latin: Reguli). Some of these rulers appear to have risen to prominence in the early 2nd century BC – one king Hilernus led a coalition of Carpetani, Vaccaei, Vettones and Celtiberians against consul Marcus Fulvius near Toletum in 193 BC, but he was defeated in battle and captured; another Regulus, Thurrus, ruler of Alce signed a treaty with Tiberius Sempronius Gracchus the Elder in 179 BC. Prior to the Second Punic War, they opposed Carthaginian expansion in central Spain, but in 220 BC Hannibal defeated a combined force of Vaccaei, Olcades and Carpetani at the battle on the Tagus, thus completing his conquest of Hispania south of the Ebro with the exception of Saguntum. They also provided mercenary troops to the Carthaginian armies, for Frontinus mentions the desertion of 3,000 Carpetani warriors from Hannibal's army when he entered in Italy after crossing the Alps, although Livy states that this desertion actually occurred earlier back in Spain, when the Carthaginian general was about to cross the Pyrenees.

Freed from Punic rule in 206 BC, the Carpetani found themselves simultaneously confronted with the threats of Celtiberian expansion over eastern Carpetania and with the unstoppable advance of the Roman conquest in the central Meseta between 193 and 179 BC, a turbulent period during which the Carpetani territory became a brutal battlefield pitting the Roman legions against the armies of the Vettones, Vaccaei, and Celtiberians. After becoming allies of Rome in 179 BC, the Carpetani were subjected to attacks by the Lusitani, Vettones, and Vaccaei during the Lusitanian Wars (155-135 BC), which certainly motivated them to support the military campaigns of consul Lucius Licinius Lucullus (151-150 BC) and proconsul Quintus Servilius Caepio (140-138 BC) in Carpetania. The Carpetani remained loyal to Rome during the Sertorian Wars, unlike their perpetual enemies, the Vettones and Celtiberians, who sided with the Sertorian faction. In 77 BC, Quintus Sertorius invaded Carpetania, where he besieged and captured the town of Caracca in retaliation.

From 197 BC and over the next 170 years, the Roman Republic slowly expanded its control over Hispania. This was a gradual process of economic, diplomatic and cultural infiltration and colonisation, with campaigns of military suppression when there was native resistance, rather than the result of a single policy of conquest. The Romans turned some of the native cities into tributary cities and established outposts and Roman colonies to expand their control.

== See also ==
- Celtiberian Wars
- Cratistii
- Lusitanian Wars
- Pre-Roman peoples of the Iberian Peninsula
- Sertorian Wars
- Vettones

== Bibliography ==
- Ángel Montenegro et alii, Historia de España 2 - colonizaciones y formación de los pueblos prerromanos (1200-218 a.C), Editorial Gredos, Madrid (1989) ISBN 84-249-1386-8
- Francisco Burillo Mozota, Los Celtíberos - etnias y estados, Crítica, Barcelona (1998, revised edition 2007) ISBN 84-7423-891-9
- Francisco Romeo Marugán, "Caída y auge de Quinto Sertorio: la primera fase de la guerra", in Desperta Ferro – Antigua y medieval No. 95, Madrid (2026) ISSN 2171-9276, pp. 18-25.
- Harry Morrison Hine, Hannibal's Battle on the Tagus (Polybius 3.14 and Livy 21.5), Latomus: revue d'études latines, Société d'Études Latines de Bruxelles 38 (4), Bruxelles (1979) ISSN 0023-8856
- João Ferreira do Amaral, Os Filhos de Caim e Portugal - povos e migrações no II milénio a.C., Quetzal Editores, Lisbon (2004) ISBN 972-564-595-2
- Juan Pereira Siesto (coord.), Prehistoria y Protohistoria de la Meseta Sur (Castilla-La Mancha), Biblioteca Añil n.º 31, ALMUD, Ediciones de Castilla-La Mancha, Ciudad Real (2007) ISBN 84-934858-5-3
- Julián Hurtado Aguña, Las gentilidades presentes en los testimonios epigráficos procedentes de la Meseta meridional, Boletín del Seminario de Estudios de Arte y Arqueología: BSAA, Tomo 69–70, (2003-2004) pp. 185–206. ISSN 0210-9573 - http://dialnet.unirioja.es/servlet/articulo?codigo=1404299
- Leonard A Curchin (5 May 2004). The Romanization of Central Spain: Complexity, Diversity and Change in a Provincial Hinterland. Routledge. pp. 37–. ISBN 978-1-134-45112-8.
- Philip Matyszak, Sertorius and the struggle for Spain, Pen & Sword Military, Barnsley (2013) ISBN 978-1-84884-787-3
- Salinas de Frías, Manuel (1986). "Indigenismo y romanización en Carpetania. Observaciones en torno al proceso romanizador en la Meseta meridional". Studia historica. Historia antigua. 4: 27–36. ISSN 0213-2052.

=== Further reading ===
- Daniel Varga, The Roman Wars in Spain: The Military Confrontation with Guerrilla Warfare, Pen & Sword Military, Barnsley (2015) ISBN 978-1-47382-781-3
- Ludwig Heinrich Dyck, The Roman Barbarian Wars: The Era of Roman Conquest, Author Solutions (2011) ISBNs 1426981821, 9781426981821
