= La Guardia, Spain =

Municipality of Spain

La Guardia
- Municipality

- Coat of arms

- Location within Castilla-La Mancha Location within Spain
- Coordinates: 39°46′59″N 3°28′59″W
- Country: Spain
- Autonomous community: Castile-La Mancha
- Province: Toledo
- Elevation: 693 m (2,274 ft)

Population (2025-01-01)
  - Total: 2,200
- Time zone: UTC+1 (CET)
  - Summer (DST): UTC+2 (CEST)

La Guardia (Spanish pronunciation: [laˈɣwaɾðja]) is a municipality located in the province of Toledo, Castile-La Mancha, Spain. There is documented presence since Bronze Age, Romans, Jews and documents since 12th century.

== Geography ==
The municipality is located in the northeastern part of the province of Toledo, and is bordered by several neighboring towns: to the northwest and west lies Huerta de Valdecarábanos; to the north, Dosbarrios; to the northeast, Villatobas; to the east, Corral de Almaguer; to the southwest, Villanueva de Bogas; to the south, Tembleque and El Romeral; and to the southeast, Lillo.

The municipality lies at the top of a hill, approximately 54 kilometers east of Toledo in the A-4 road route connecting Madrid and Andalusia. It belongs to the comarca of Mesa de Ocaña and includes the territories of several now-abandoned settlements: Casar de Redondeo, Daucos, San Cebrián or Cuartos de la Hoz, Santa María, and Villapalomas.

Several streams run through the municipal area, although most remain dry for much of the year. These include the Arroyo Cedrón, Vadeláguila, and Fuente del Madero.

== History ==
Archaeological remains found in this municipality and its surroundings indicate continuous human presence since prehistoric times, with successive occupations by various peoples up until the Roman conquest.

Its elevated position and strategic location along the route to Andalusia have historically granted it particular significance.

Following the Reconquista, King Alfonso VI ordered that the town be taken by the Knights of St. John, to whose Order it subsequently belonged.

La Guardia was gifted to the archbishop of Toledo Rodrigo Jiménez de Rada circa 1211–13, and also received a fuero. In 1218, its privileges were ratified. In 1581, La Guardia was segregated from the archbishop's possessions, as it was sold to the Count of Campo Rey, paving the way for a downward spiral.

== Folklore ==
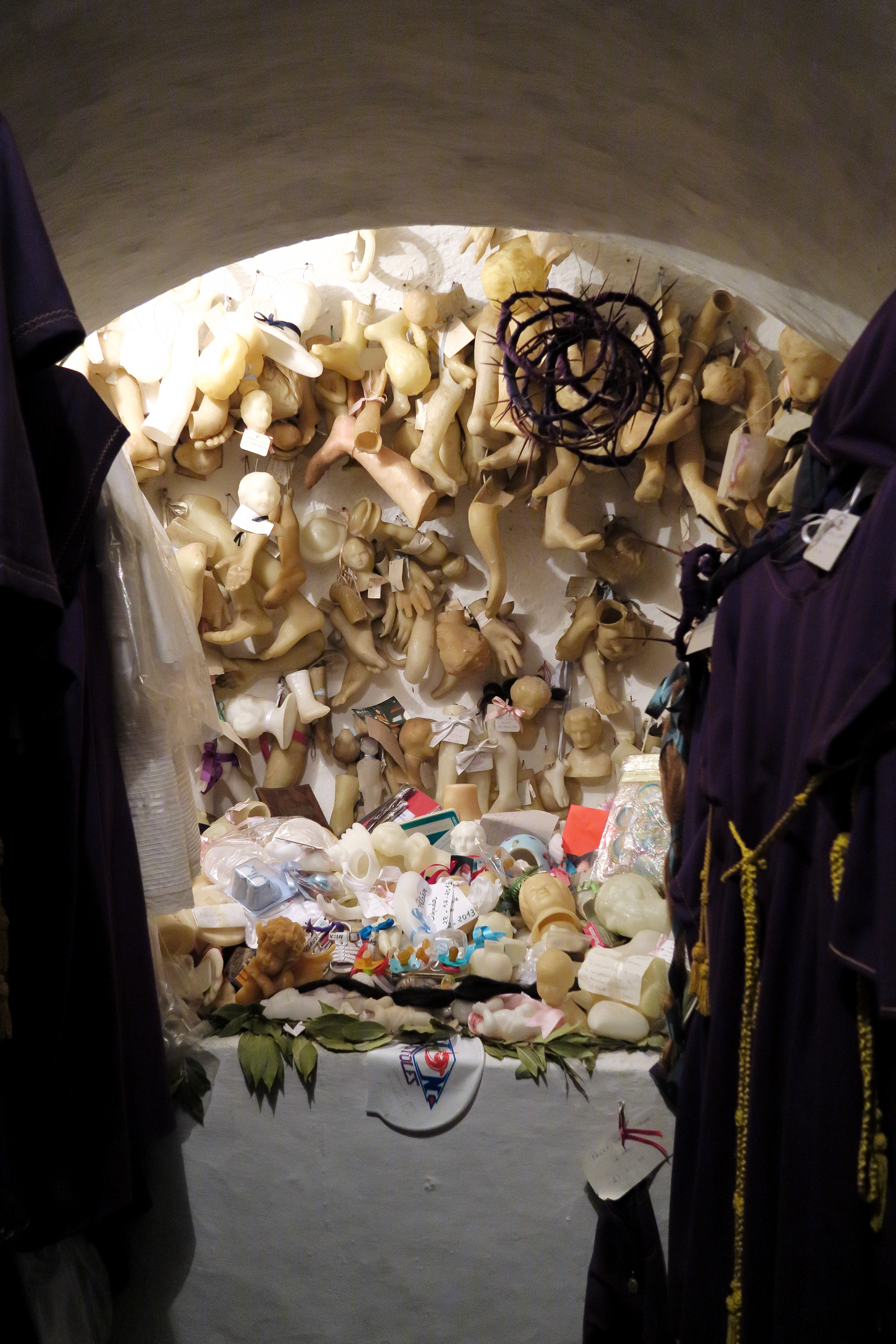
Offerings in the hermitage of the Holy Child of La Guardia

The Holy Child of La Guardia, the purported victim of a 15th-century antisemitic blood libel, is revered as a folk saint in the locality, inspiring a pilgrimage with his icon every 25 September.

== Population ==
- 2.329 inhabitants (as Spanish Statistical National Institute) 2006.
- 1166 men and 1163 women.
