= Santa Cruz de la Zarza =

- Municipality
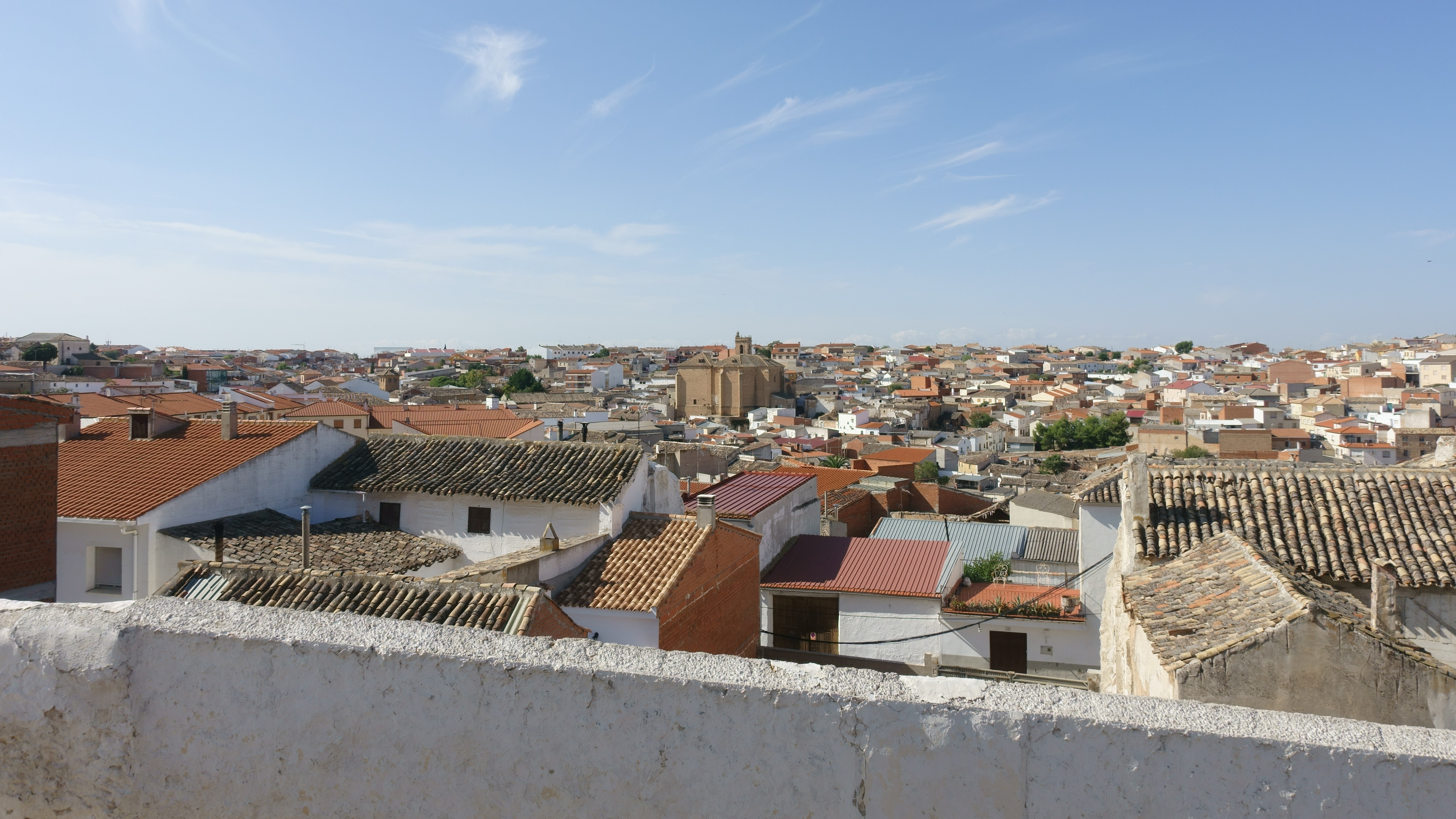

- Coat of arms

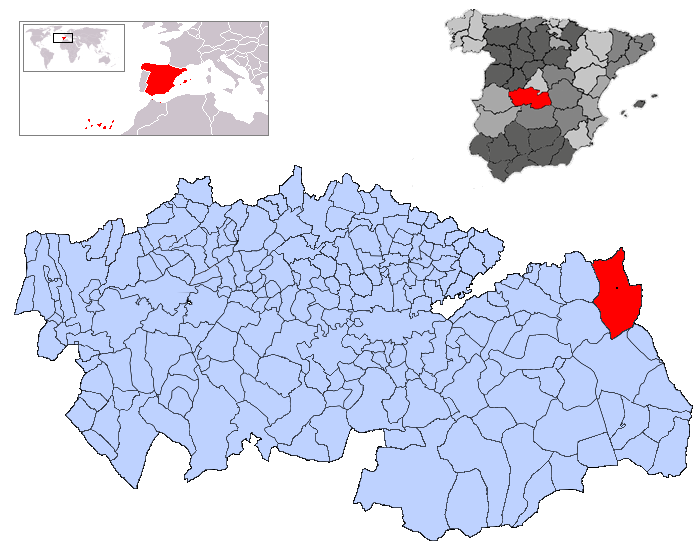

- Location in Spain
- Coordinates: 39°58′36″N 3°11′27″W
- Country: Spain
- Autonomous community: Castile-La Mancha
- Province: Toledo
- Comarca: Mesa de Ocaña
- Judicial district: Ocaña
- Founded: Early 12th century (before 1175) by the Knights of Santiago.

Government
  - Alcalde: Román Muñoz Sánchez (2007)

Area
  - Total: 264.54 km^{2} (102.14 sq mi)
- Elevation: 790 m (2,590 ft)

Population (2025-01-01)
  - Total: 4,180
  - Density: 15.8/km^{2} (40.9/sq mi)
- Demonym(s): santacrucero, ra / santacruceño, ña
- Time zone: UTC+1 (CET)
  - Summer (DST): UTC+2 (CEST)
- Postal code: 45370
- Dialing code: 925125 and 925143
- Official language(s): Castilian
- Website: Official website

Santa Cruz de la Zarza is a small rural town and municipality in the province of Toledo, part of the autonomous community of Castile-La Mancha, Spain, located northeast of Mesa de Ocaña and south of the river Tagus.

== Name ==
According to legend, having to happen one day the Gothic king Recaredo, for the street of the Cava that to the season was in those days a covered rill of undergrowth, the neighbors set fire to the brambles and between the flames, some cross of wood appeared without damage, after this fact, the village started to be called Santa Cruz entre Zarzas, evolving later to the name that today has. Other sources affirm that the origin of the name of Santa Cruz de la Zarza can come from its geographical situation placed between two valleys and between these two valleys there was a mountain of bramble patches.

In any case, it seems that the name alludes, on the one hand, to the Order of Santiago ("the Holy Cross"); the bramble corresponds to a form used during the repopulation era of the Reconquista period, which often used names of plants: Ajofrín (garlic), Cebolla (onion), Almendros (almond trees), Perales (pear trees), Perales de Tajuña, Perales del Río, etc.

A last hypothesis suggests that the name "Zarza" can be related to the group of place names derived from the Latin quercus "oak", such as Cerceda, Cercedilla, Cercedo, etc. Since quercus is a feminine noun of the fourth declension in Latin, bramble might derive from the form of the Latin quercea, "oak". Another possibility is that from the adjective querceus, "relative to the oak", comes the form of the neutral plural *quercea, "place abundant in oaks, grove of evergreen oaks". The evolution would be Quercea> *Kercea> *Kercia> *Cerza> Zarza. Other points in favour of this hypothesis are the thick groves of evergreen oaks preserved in the surroundings of the municipality.

== Heraldry ==
The shield of Santa Cruz de la Zarza is on a field of silver, a Latin Cross of saber supported in divided and cut brambles, being it top part of sinople and it low part of gules. To the stamp, closed Sunflower.

== Geography ==
=== Location ===
It is located in the northeast region of the province of Toledo, on the border between Toledo, Madrid and Cuenca. It is located 85, 83, and 101 km from the provincial capitals, respectively. Its length is 264.54 km^{2}, and its altitude is 790 m. Bordered by the municipalities of Villamanrique de Tajo and Fuentidueña de Tajo in the north, in the province of Madrid; Villarrubia de Santiago and Villatobas, the east; Corral de Almaguer and Cabezamesada, in the south; all of them in the province of Toledo; and Tarancón, Zarza de Tajo, Fuente de Pedro Naharro and Horcajo de Santiago, west, in the province of Cuenca. The township is crossed by the River Tagus. Its location in the northeastern part of the high plateau known as the Mesa de Ocaña offers from the top, with levels higher than 800 m, one of the best perspectives on the valley Tagus.

It can be seen Santa Cruz de la Zarza in Google Maps.

=== Natural Resources ===
In Santa Cruz de la Zarza there is a very important natural asset, presenting unique habitats that have been identified as priorities by the European directives. These are the areas declared as Sites of Community Importance (SCIs), as the steppes of Toledo saline or reservoir plaster in the Tagus valley. There are Areas of Special Protection for Birds (SPBs) in the steppe area north of the stain. For all its lengthy term there are numerous caves, mostly uninhabited, and a large number of oak groves, as well as a host of water wells and water for livestock.

=== Climate ===
The climate of Santa Cruz de la Zarza is Mediterranean/Continental. The winters are cool, with average temperatures lower than 5 °C, night frosts very frequent and occasional snowfall (three or four a year). The summers are hot, with average temperatures higher than 24 °C in July and August, with peaks reaching 35 °C. The daily thermal oscillation is about 10 °C.

== History ==
The oldest remains of this village date back to the second Iron Age, namely the necropolis of Las Esperillas. Since antiquity it has been an important center for communications and a defensive post of the Romans as well as the Visigoths and Arabs, given its dominant position over the Tagus Valley. It was ceded to the Order of Santiago before 1175, established there after the confirmation of Pope Alexander III on this date, as an encomienda. In 1242 it grew in importance under the leadership of Rodrigo Iñiguez, head of the encomienda of his name, and in 1253, the Master of the Order of Santiago, Don Pelayo Pérez Correa granted the village a charter.

== Demographics ==
According to the 2011 census, Santa Cruz de la Zarza had a population of 4,906. The main economic activity of Santa Cruz de la Zarza has traditionally been agriculture and livestock, although, according to the INE, in 2006 the distribution of employment by occupation was as follows: 31.5% of the population was in the service sector (mainly trade), 26.5% in industry, 20.4% in agriculture and livestock and the remaining 21.6% in the construction industry.

Their main celebrations take place at the end of August, in honor of Our Lady of the Rosary.
