= La Zarza =

La Zarza may refer to the following places in Spain:

- La Zarza, Badajoz, a municipality in the province of Badajoz, Extremadura.
- La Zarza, Valladolid, a municipality in the province of Valladolid, Castile and León.
- La Zarza-Perrunal, a municipality in the province of Huelva, Andalusia.
- La Zarza de Pumareda, a municipality in the province of Salamanca, Castile and León.
- Santa Cruz de la Zarza, a municipality in the province of Toledo, part of the autonomous community of Castile-La Mancha.

== See also ==
- Zarza (disambiguation)
