= Battle of Montiel (1143) =

Battle of the Reconquista

Coordinates: 39°0′N 4°0′W

- Part of the Reconquista
Date	1143
Location	Montiel, Kingdom of Castile
Result	Christian victory

Belligerents
Kingdom of Castile	Almoravid dynasty

Commanders and leaders
Muño Alfonso	Umar al-Lamtuniz †

Strength
Unknown	Unknown

Casualties and losses
Unknown	Numerous prisoners of war

On 1 March 1143 the Battle of Montiel was fought between Muño Alfonso and an army of knights from Ávila, Segovia, and Toledo on one side and a force of Almoravids on the other. The Christians were accompanied by priests. It was a decisive victory for Muño.

Early in 1143 Muño set out with a hand-picked troop of 900 knights and 1,000 infantrymen of the local militias to raid the area around Córdoba. On his return through the Muradal Pass he caught sight of a pursuing Almoravid army, also composed of cavalry and infantry. Just past the castle of Calatrava on the road to Toledo, at Montiel in La Mancha, Muño turned to face the Muslims. The Anales toledanos primeros locate the battle on the rio que dicen Adoro (river called Adoro), which may be either the Azuer near Montiel or the Algodor near Mora.

The emirs of Seville and Córdoba were both killed, as well as several other Almoravid commanders. A large booty that included gold, silver, precious garments, livestock, weapons, and prisoners was taken. After the battle the victorious army returned to Toledo with the infantry carrying the booty. The heads of the two emirs and the other commanders were impaled on spears and marched about the city as trophies. Muño then ordered them hung from the towers, but Empress Berenguela had them taken down and given to some Jewish and Muslim physicians to be anointed with myrrh and aloes and sent to Córdoba, to their widows.
