= Algodor River =

River in central Spain

Coordinates: 39°54′N 3°52′W

Algodor
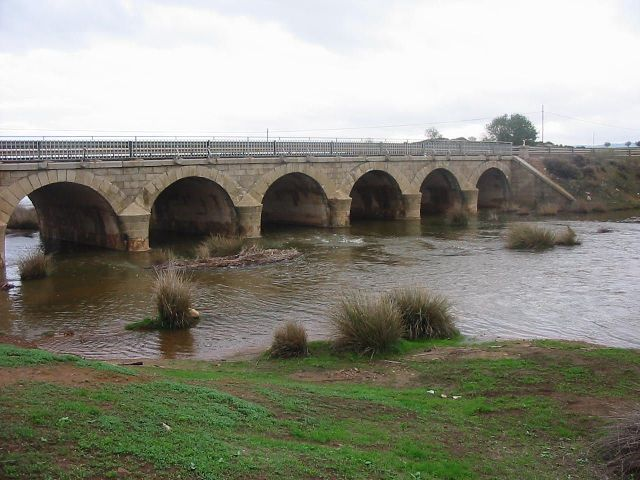
- Bridge of the N-401 road over the Algodor near Los Yébenes.

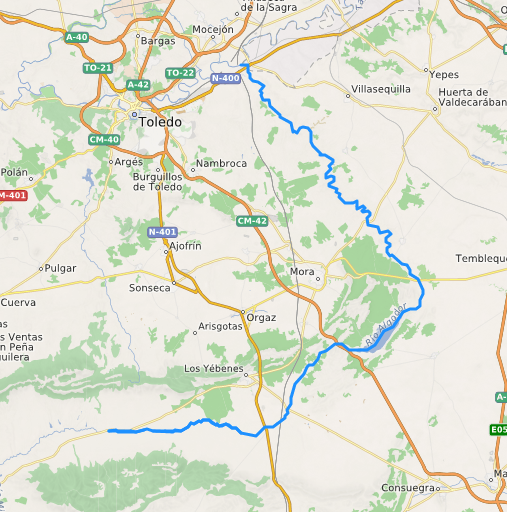

Location
- Country: Spain

Physical characteristics
- Source
  - location: Laguna del Navajo, Montes de Toledo
  - elevation: 822 m (2,697 ft)
- Mouth
  - location: Tagus, near Algodor
  - elevation: 460 m (1,510 ft)
- Length: 102 km (63 mi)
- Basin size: 1,250 km^{2} (480 sq mi)
- Discharge
  - average: 1.93 m^{3}/s (68 cu ft/s)

Basin features
- Progression: Tagus→ Atlantic Ocean

The Algodor is a 102 km long river in Central Spain. It is a left hand tributary to the Tagus.

== Course ==
Its source is at the Laguna del Navajo in the Montes de Toledo, within the Retuerta del Bullaque municipal limits, Castile-La Mancha. It flows roughly northwards across the Province of Toledo into the Tagus at Aceca, a place near Algodor, the village within the Aranjuez municipality limits that gives the river its name.

The area around the source is the place of some historical significance since in 1143, a a fierce battle took place between the Muslims of Calatrava and the Castilian commanding knight Muno Alfonso in which the latter was defeated and killed. Some years prior the Muslims had encamped there whilst trying to encounter the Christian forces during the siege of the strategic castle of Oreja.

The Algodor River has two dams, which form the 133 hm³ Embalse de Finisterre reservoir built in 1977, located between Tembleque, Mora, Villanueva de Bogas, and Turleque, and the smaller 8 hm³ Embalse del Castro reservoir built in 1974 near Villamuelas.

All the Algodor's tributaries are small rivulets except for the Bracea River on its left margin.

== See also ==
- List of rivers of Spain
