= Yepes =

- Municipality
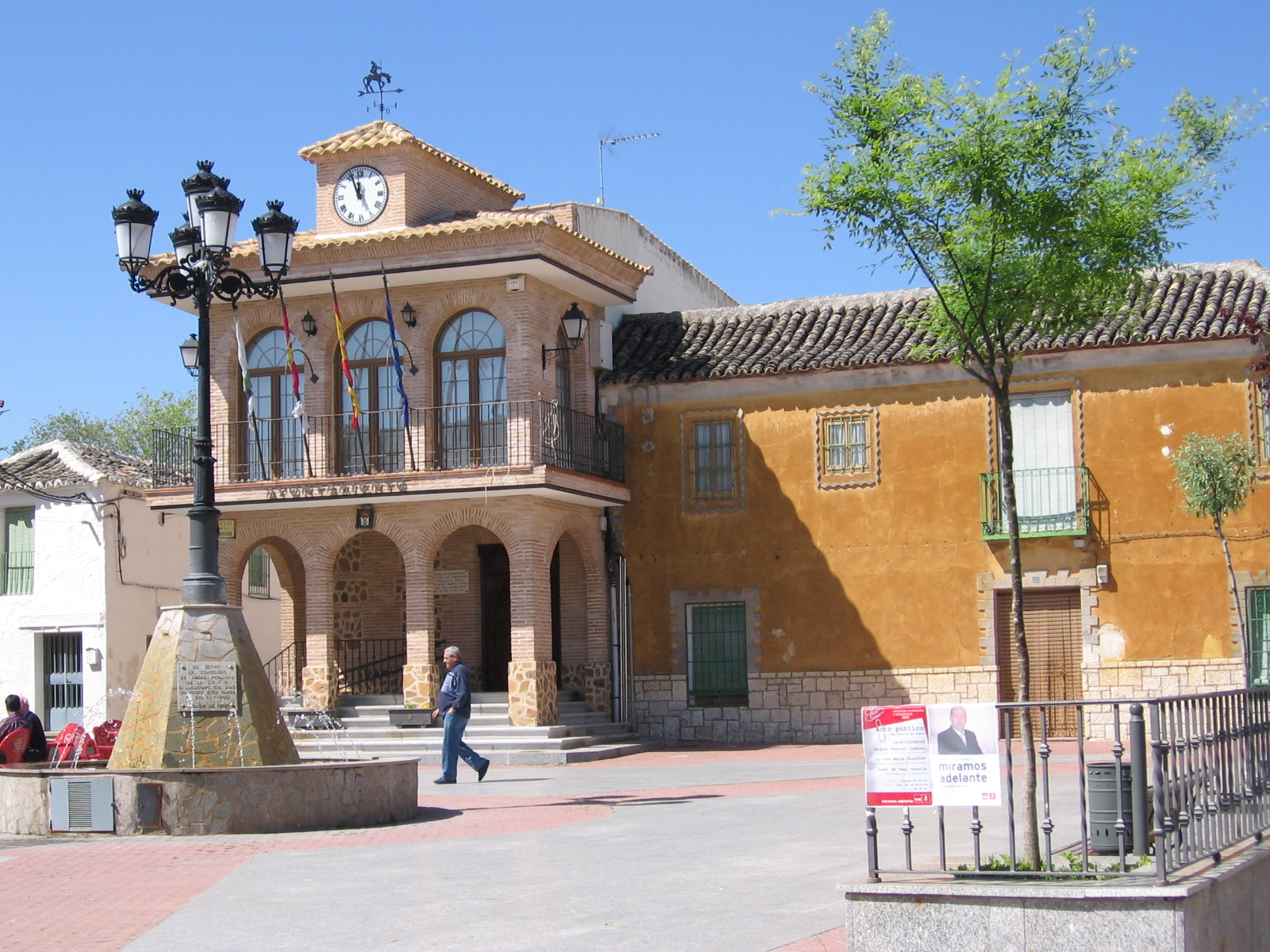
- Town hall

- Location in Spain
- Coordinates: 39°54′10″N 3°37′25″W
- Country: Spain
- Autonomous community: Castile-La Mancha
- Province: Toledo
- Comarca: Mesa de Ocaña
- Judicial district: Ocaña
- Founded: See text

Government
  - Alcalde: Antonio Rodríguez-Tembleco de la Oliva (2007)

Area
  - Total: 85 km^{2} (33 sq mi)
- Elevation: 699 m (2,293 ft)

Population (2025-01-01)
  - Total: 5,820
  - Density: 68/km^{2} (180/sq mi)
- Demonym(s): Yepero, ra Yepesino, na Hipponense, sa
- Time zone: UTC+1 (CET)
  - Summer (DST): UTC+2 (CEST)
- Postal code: 45313
- Dialing code: 34 (España) + 925 (provincia de Toledo) + 154/155/147
- Official language(s): Spanish

Yepes is a villa (town) in the northern region of the province of Toledo, in the autonomous community of Castile-La Mancha, Spain.

== Population ==
- The first numbers about the population of Yepes date back to 1534 and account for some 4000 or 5000 inhabitants.
- In the 20th century the population was 4767 (INE 2005).
- As the last update (2006): population was some 5200 inhabitants.

== Geography ==
Situated on the westernmost part of the comarca called La Mesa de Ocaña (the plateau of Ocaña), its limits are:

- North: Aranjuez (province of Madrid), Ciruelos and Ocaña (province of Toledo)
- East: Ocaña
- South: Villaseca de Yepes and Huerta de Valdecarábanos (Toledo)
- West: Aranjuez and Almonacid (Toledo)

== History ==
Yepes has the first documented human presence in a Celtiberian village, founded ca. 600 BC.

The former Hippo or Hippona of the Carpetanians, where the Celtiberians defeated the Roman troops of Quintius and Calpurnius, derives its current from the times of the Muslim rule, when it was called Hepes, which in turn would produce Hiepes, Iepes and finally Yepes. It is possible that Hepes be a mozarabic toponym.

During the reign of Alfonso VII, "Yepes and its castle" are ceded to the Concello (Council) of San Nicolás.

== Monuments ==
=== Plaza Mayor (Main Square) ===
The plan was originally triangular, with the Church and the Archiepiscopal Palace at the sides, and an administrative building at the base. During the 16th century it served as a place for spectacles. Besides, testimonies of the time reveal that there was a good mesón at it.

Later, in the 18th century, the Archiepiscopal Palace was modified in order to create 19 homes for people living in caves and a slaughter house, thus giving the square its current rectangular shape.

=== Colegiata de San Benito Abad ===
This church, dedicated to abbot Saint Benito, was designed by Alonso de Covarrubias, master of the Toledo Cathedral. It is a splendid building of white stone, dating from late Gothic and early Renaissance. It consists of three naves, plus two series of side chapels and a 70-metre tower.

== Sources ==
- Website of the Diputación of the province of Toledo
