= Ontígola =

- Municipality
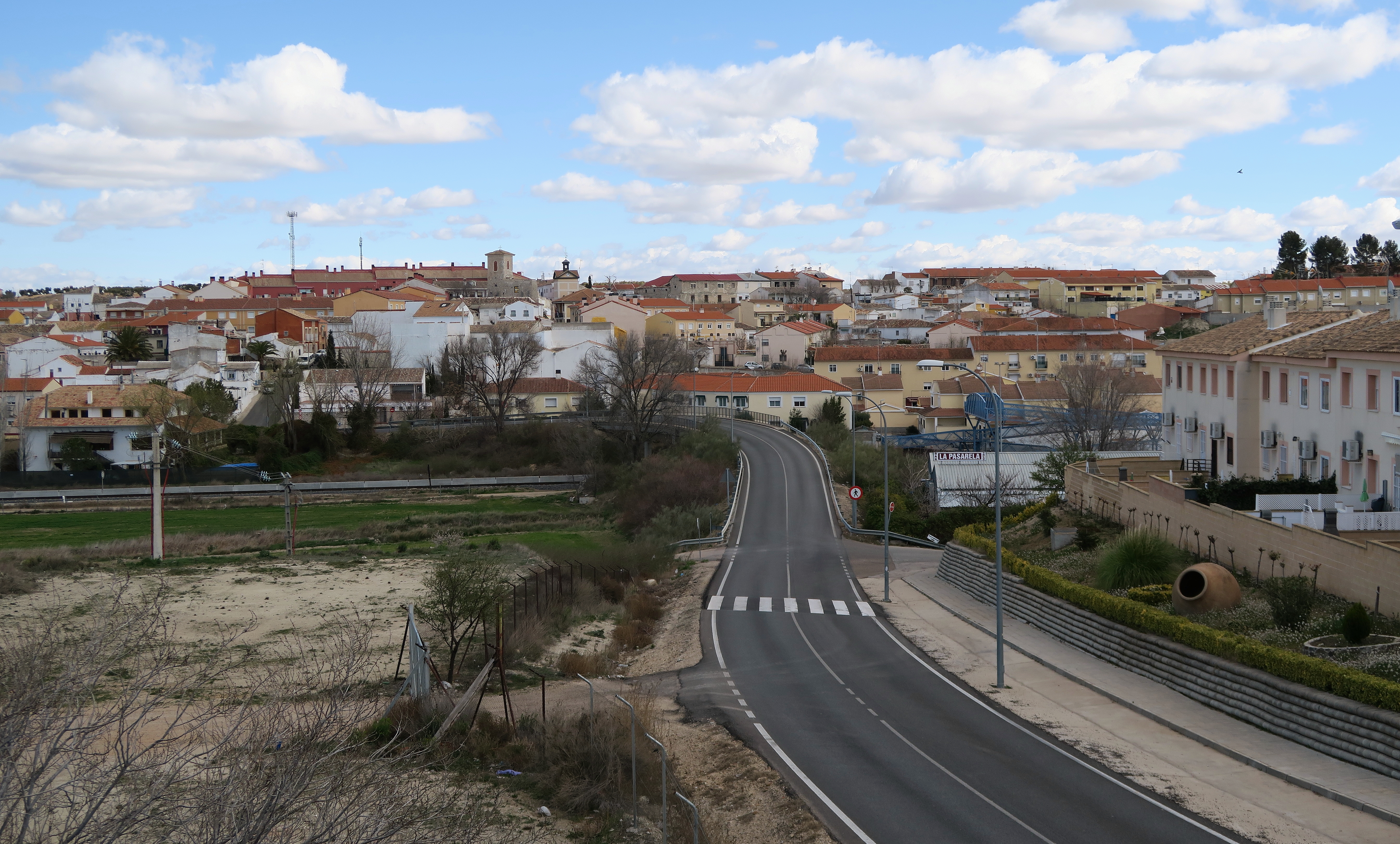

- Flag Coat of arms

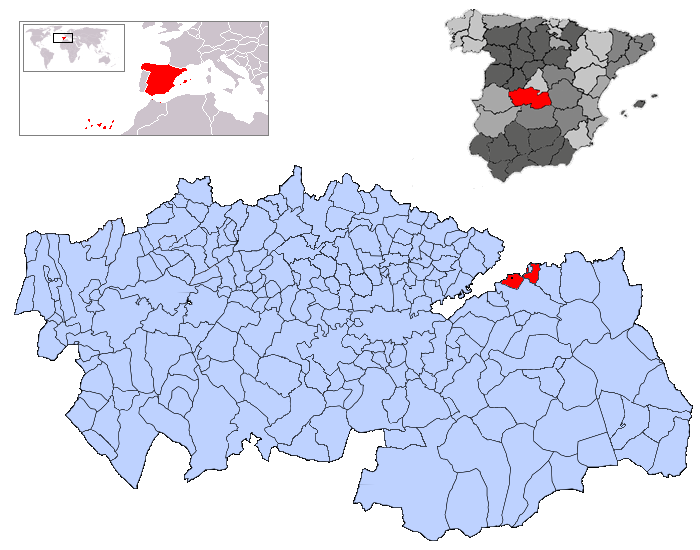

- Location in Spain
- Coordinates: 40°0′20″N 3°34′23″W
- Country: Spain
- Autonomous community: Castile-La Mancha
- Province: Toledo
- Comarca: Mesa de Ocaña
- Judicial district: Ocaña

Government
  - Alcalde: Gracia Sánchez Ruiz (2015)

Area
  - Total: 41.49 km^{2} (16.02 sq mi)
- Elevation: 602 m (1,975 ft)

Population (2025-01-01)
  - Total: 5,101
  - Density: 122.9/km^{2} (318.4/sq mi)
- Demonym(s): Ontigoleño, ña Orejano, na Aurelanense, sa
- Time zone: UTC+1 (CET)
  - Summer (DST): UTC+2 (CEST)
- Postal code: 45340
- Dialing code: 925
- Website: Official website

Ontígola is a municipality located in the province of Toledo, Castile-La Mancha, Spain. According to the 2023 census (INE), the municipality has a population of 4926 inhabitants in 2023.

== Etymology ==
The name "Ontígola" is derived from the Latin FŎNTĬCŬLA, a diminutive of FŎNTIS. The original Latin translates to "fountain", or "spring of water which sprouts from the earth." The name appears in various forms throughout history: Fonticulam, Fontigula, Antigola, Hontigola

In this township is the ancient Roman town of Aurelia, current Oreja, an uninhabited today. Oreja played an important role in the defensive line Islamic of Tagus River in the 11th century and especially during the s. XII.

During the War of Independence, the Nov. 18, 1809 took place the battle of Ontígola, a clash near the town among the Spanish troops under the command of Juan Carlos de Aréizaga, and French. The latter refused to Spanish; the most significant death was the General Paris, who died at the hands of Cape Vincent Manzano, on the French side. In the Spanish side Angel Saavedra died, Duke of Rivas. Nicomedes Pastor Diaz and Francisco de Cardenas describes well the end of the battle: "He closed the night sad and black: confused disorder ours in Ocaña retired to where was because the bulk of the French army and their general stayed in Antígola, they left the battlefield strewn with bodies".
