= Muño Alfonso =

Galician knight (died 1143)

Munio or Muño Alfonso (died 2 August 1143) was a Galician nobleman and military leader in the Reconquista, the governor of Toledo under Alfonso VII. He is the hero of the second book of the anonymous Chronica Adefonsi imperatoris, a contemporary history of the Alfonso's reign. He was also the inspiration and historical basis for the play Munio Alfonso, the second by Cuban playwright Gertrudis Gómez de Avellaneda, first staged in Madrid in 1844.

At some point—the Chronica does not say when—Muño murdered his own legitimate daughter because she was "consorting with a certain young man". After repenting of the act he sought to make a pilgrimage to Jerusalem but, at Alfonso's urging, the Archbishop of Toledo, Raymond de Sauvetât, forbid him to go, instead requiring him to engage in continual warfare with the Andalusian Muslims as a penance.

Muño is first recorded under the year 1131 as the castellan of the castle of Mora in the Chronica Adefonsi imperatoris. In that year an Almoravid army under Farax, governor of Calatrava, and Ali, governor of San Esteban, penetrated the Tajo valley and captured the then governor of Toledo, Gutierre Armíldez, at the Battle of Alamín near Escalona, and killed him. The governors of Escalona, Domingo and Diego Álvarez, were killed in another skirmish, and the governor of Hita, Fernando Fernández was also defeated on the same campaign. Muño was captured on this expedition and imprisoned in Córdoba. There he was tortured and deprived of food and drink until he was able to ransom himself after a few days with a large sum of gold, silver, livestock, and arms. He returned first to Toledo, then to Mora.

The author of the Chronica Adefonsi imperatoris accuses Muño of neglecting the castle of Mora, keeping it insufficiently stocked to resist a large-scale attack. Sometime before 1139, the castle was taken in Muño's absence by Azuel and Abenceta, the Almoravid governors respectively of Córdoba and Seville, who re-fortified and re-provisioned it. Muño, disgraced, refused to appear before the emperor, who immediately ordered the construction of more powerful fortress opposite Mora: Peñas Negras (nicknamed Peña Cristiana), which he entrusted to Martín Fernández, the son of Fernando Fernández and his successor as governor of Hita. Muño responded to his fall from favour by increasing his raids on Muslim territory. With the militias of Toledo, Ávila, Segovia, Guadalajara, Talavera, and Madrid, he took a large amount of booty and killed many Muslim leaders. On hearing of his successes Alfonso called Muño to court and made him vice-governor of Toledo, placing all the cavalry and infantry of the Trans-Sierra under his authority. In 1143 he led the municipal militias of Ávila, Segovia, and Toledo the campaign against Córdoba that culminated in the Battle of Montiel. He returned to Toledo in a triumphal procession, with an enormous booty. In the same year Alfonso gathered a large army of infantry and archery and camped on the Tajo near Toledo in preparation for a campaign against Córdoba. He left Toledo in the care of Muño and Martín Fernández, commanding them to stay at Peña Negra and prevent the Almoravids from fortifying Mora. While Alfonso was in Andalusia, Farax of Calatrava allied with the Almoravid commanders along the Guadalquivir intending to re-fortify Mora and prepare an ambush for Muño.

Before sunrise on 1 August Muño with forty knights left Peña Negra under the command of Martín in order to scout enemy movements in the hills near Calatrava. They captured a solitary spy hiding in cave, who was divulging the details of Farax's expedition when the Muslim governor's vanguard appeared on the horizon. Battle was immediately joined and the Christians were victorious. Muño then returned to prepare with Martín for battle the next day, when the main body of Farax's troops would arrive. The next day (2 August) the Christians encountered the Muslims near the springs of the river Algodor. Martín was wounded in the fighting, but both sides withdrew without victory. Martín then returned to defend Peña Negra. Subsequently, a second battle was fought in the open field. Muño, realising that he was at a disadvantage, ordered his men to retreat to a large rock called Peña del Cuervo. There beset by enemy archers, he was wounded by an arrow and died during the Muslims' third offensive. All of those who had climbed the rock with him also died, as did many of the Muslim leaders. Muño's corpse was beheaded, as were those of many Christians, and his right arm and shoulder and right leg were also severed. The head was sent to Córdoba to the house of the widow of Azuel, then to Seville to Abenceta, and finally it was carried to the Almoravid sultan Texufin and all over Morocco to pronounce Muño's death. His arm and leg and the heads of his comrades were hung from the towers of Calatrava. Muño's body and those of his knights were recovered by the citizens of Toledo and buried in the cemetery of Saint Mary there. The author of the Chronica blames Muño's fate on the murder of his daughter: "He did not pity his own daughter as the Lord pitied him in all of the battles which he had fought." Then follows a citation of the Gospel of John, 8:7.

In his capacity as leader of the Reconquista along the front south of Toledo, Muño's immediate successor was Sancho Jimeno the Hunchback, the leader of the militia of Ávila.
