= Zarza =

Zarza can be:

- Zarza la Mayor, municipality located in the province of Cáceres, Extremadura, Spain
- Zarza de Tajo, municipality in Cuenca, Castile-La Mancha, Spain
- Zarza de Montánchez, municipality located in the province of Cáceres, Extremadura, Spain
- Zarza de Granadilla, municipality located in the province of Cáceres, Extremadura
- Zarza-Capilla, Spanish municipality in the province of Badajoz, Extremadura
- Anselmo Zarza Bernal, Roman Catholic Bishop in Mexico
- Rafael Zarza Gonzalez, Cuban artist specializing in painting, engraving and graphic design
- Samuel ibn Seneh Zarza, Spanish philosopher who lived at Valencia in the second half of the 14th century

== See also ==
- La Zarza (disambiguation)
- Zarzuela, a Spanish opera genre whose name is derived from the word Zarza.
