= Villarrubia =

Villarrubia may refer to:

- José Villarrubia (born 1961), Spanish artist
- Villarrubia CF, Spanish football club
- Villarrubia de Santiago, municipality in Castile-La Mancha, Spain
- Villarrubia de los Ojos, municipality in Castile-La Mancha, Spain
