= Noblejas =

- Municipality
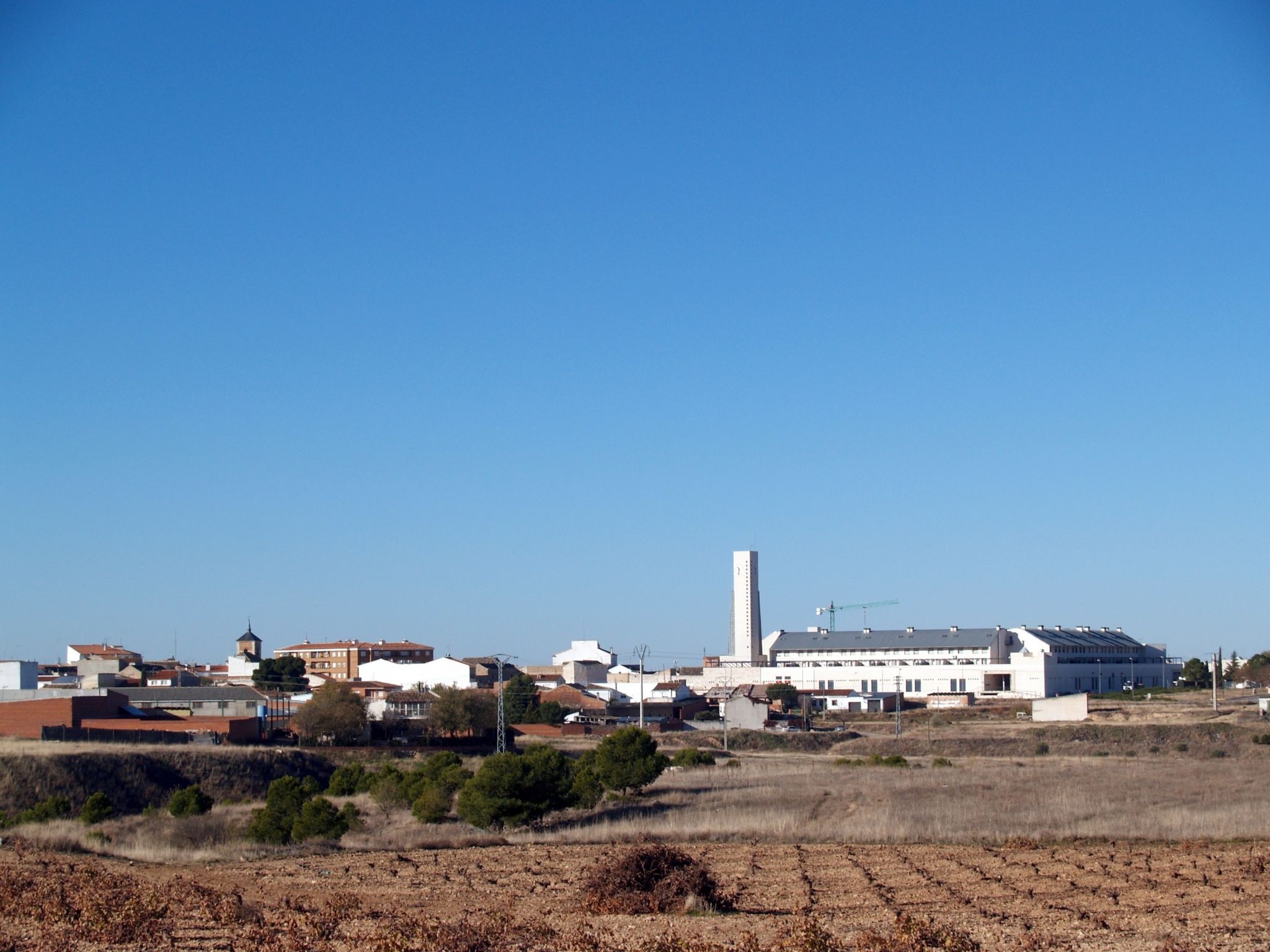

- Flag Coat of arms

- Location within Castilla-La Mancha Location within Spain
- Coordinates: 39°59′N 3°26′W
- Country: Spain
- Autonomous community: Castilla–La Mancha
- Province: Toledo

Area
  - Total: 69.67 km^{2} (26.90 sq mi)
  - Water: 735 km^{2} (284 sq mi)

Population (2025-01-01)
  - Total: 3,998
  - Density: 57.38/km^{2} (148.6/sq mi)
- Time zone: UTC+1 (CET)
  - Summer (DST): UTC+2 (CEST)

Noblejas is a municipality of Spain located in the province of Toledo, Castilla–La Mancha. The municipality spans across a total area of 69.67 km^{2} and, as of 1 January 2021, it has a registered population of 3,721. Radio Exterior (the Spanish state's international shortwave station) has transmitter its 0.5 km (500 yards) south of Noblejas. It belongs to the traditional comarca of Mesa de Ocaña.

== History ==
In 1149 it was reported to be a hamlet belonging to Aurelia (Oreja). By 1224, it was reported as a populated place attached to the Order of Santiago. It was already a town by the early 15th century.

== Demographics ==
Historical population
Year	Pop.	±%
1900	2,809	—
1910	3,127	+11.3%
1920	3,170	+1.4%
1930	3,237	+2.1%
1940	3,136	−3.1%
1950	3,127	−0.3%
1960	2,904	−7.1%
1970	2,825	−2.7%
1981	2,885	+2.1%
1991	2,842	−1.5%
2001	3,063	+7.8%
2011	3,617	+18.1%
2021	3,721	+2.9%
2023	3,911	+5.1%
Source: INE
