= Battle of Alamín =

1131 battle in Castile-La Mancha, Spain

- Part of the Reconquista
Date	1131
Location	Near Escalona
Result	Almoravid victory

Belligerents
Almoravids	Kingdom of León and Castile

Commanders and leaders
Al-Faraj of Calatrava; Ali of San Esteban	Gutierre Armíldez †; Muño Alfonso (POW)

Strength
Unknown	40 knights

Casualties and losses
Unknown	All killed or captured

The Battle of Alamín was a military skirmish in 1131 between the Almoravids and the Kingdom of León and Castile at Alamín Castle near Escalona. The Castilian force was ambushed and destroyed.

== Background ==
The fortified city of Toledo had been held by the Kingdom of León and Castile since its capture in 1085. Although the Almoravids had attempted to retake the city in 1090 and then again in 1099, all attempts were unsuccessful. In 1108, the Almoravids attempted to recapture Toledo only to fall short once again. After 1108, the Almoravids conducted regular raids of the territory around the Tagus River, attempting to capture towns and destroy fortifications to isolate Toledo.

To support their operations, the Almoravids had established two separate bases for operations against Toledo, Calatrava la Vieja to the south and Colmenar de Oreja to the northeast. In 1130, the Almoravids under the command of Tashfin ibn Ali attacked and destroyed the fortified Castilian outpost of Aceca, northeast of Toledo. The following year, the Almoravids continued their campaign of harassing the Castilian Kingdom of Toledo.

== The battle ==
In 1131, two Almoravid governors, Al-Faraj of Calatrava and Ali of San Esteban, took a small cavalry force and conducted a raid on the territory surrounding the fortified city of Toledo. During the night, the Almoravid force traveled to Escalona approximately 46 kilometers northwest of Toledo where they scouted the area to select a place where a Castilian sortie might be lured into an ambush.

The next day, Almoravid horsemen rode 15 kilometers up the Alberche River to the Alamín Castle, a small Castilian outpost protecting a river crossing. At the castle, they drew the attention of the garrison by making "a great noise" and pretending to steal cattle. When the Castilians responded by sending 40 horsemen out of the castle to confront the raiders, the Almoravids fled. The governor of Toledo, Gutierre Armíldez, happened to be at the outpost that day and chose to accompany the Castilian pursuers.

As the Almoravids fled southwest back toward Escalona, they ultimately led their pursuers into a trap. The Almoravids had hidden troops in a deep valley and "rose up like a thick cloud" surrounding the Castilians. In the fighting that ensued, Armíldez was killed along with the majority of his men. Among the Castilians taken prisoner was the Galician nobleman and military leader, Muño Alfonso.

== Aftermath ==
Muño was sent to Cordoba and imprisoned, but days later, he was able to ransom himself with gold, silver, horses, and many weapons. Muño would be notable later in waging campaigns against the Almoravids.
