= Samuel ibn Seneh Zarza =

Samuel ibn Seneh Zarza (Hebrew: שמואל אבן סנה) was a Spanish philosopher who lived in Palencia in the second half of the 14th century. According to Leopold Zunz, his surname is derived from the Spanish town Zarza (= "thorn-bush"), and is accordingly synonymous with the Hebrew "seneh." Of his life no details are known, for while in his notes on the Sefer ha-Yuḥasin (ed. Filipowski, p. 226) Samuel Shullam states that Zarza was burned at the stake by the tribunal of Valencia on the denunciation of Isaac Campanton, who accused him of denying the creation of the world, historians have proved this assertion a mere legend. Although a comparatively unimportant writer, if his two works may serve as a criterion, Zarza ranked high in the estimation of his contemporaries, so that the poet Solomon Reubeni of Barcelona and the astronomer Isaac ibn Al-Ḥadib (in 1377) composed poems in his honor.

Zarza was the author of the Meḳor Ḥayyim, a philosophical commentary on the Pentateuch (1368; printed Mantua, 1559), and of the Miklol Yofi, a philosophical commentary devoted to the haggadot found in both Talmudim and divided into 151 chapters and seven parts (Neubauer, Cat. Bodl. Hebr. MSS. No. 1296). In the introduction to the latter work Zarza draws a melancholy picture of the state of the Jews of Castile in his time, stating that in Toledo alone 10,000 perished in the course of the war between Peter of Castile and his half brother Henry II of Castile. In his Meḳor Ḥayyim, Zarza mentions four other writings of his which are no longer in existence: Ṭaharat ha-Ḳodesh, on the principles of religion, Eẓem ha-Dat, Ẓeror ha-Mor, and Magen Abraham.

== Jewish Encyclopedia bibliography ==
- Steinschneider, Cat. Bodl. cols. 2496-98
- Grätz, Gesch. 3d ed., viii.16, 23, 25-26
