= Mora, Spain =

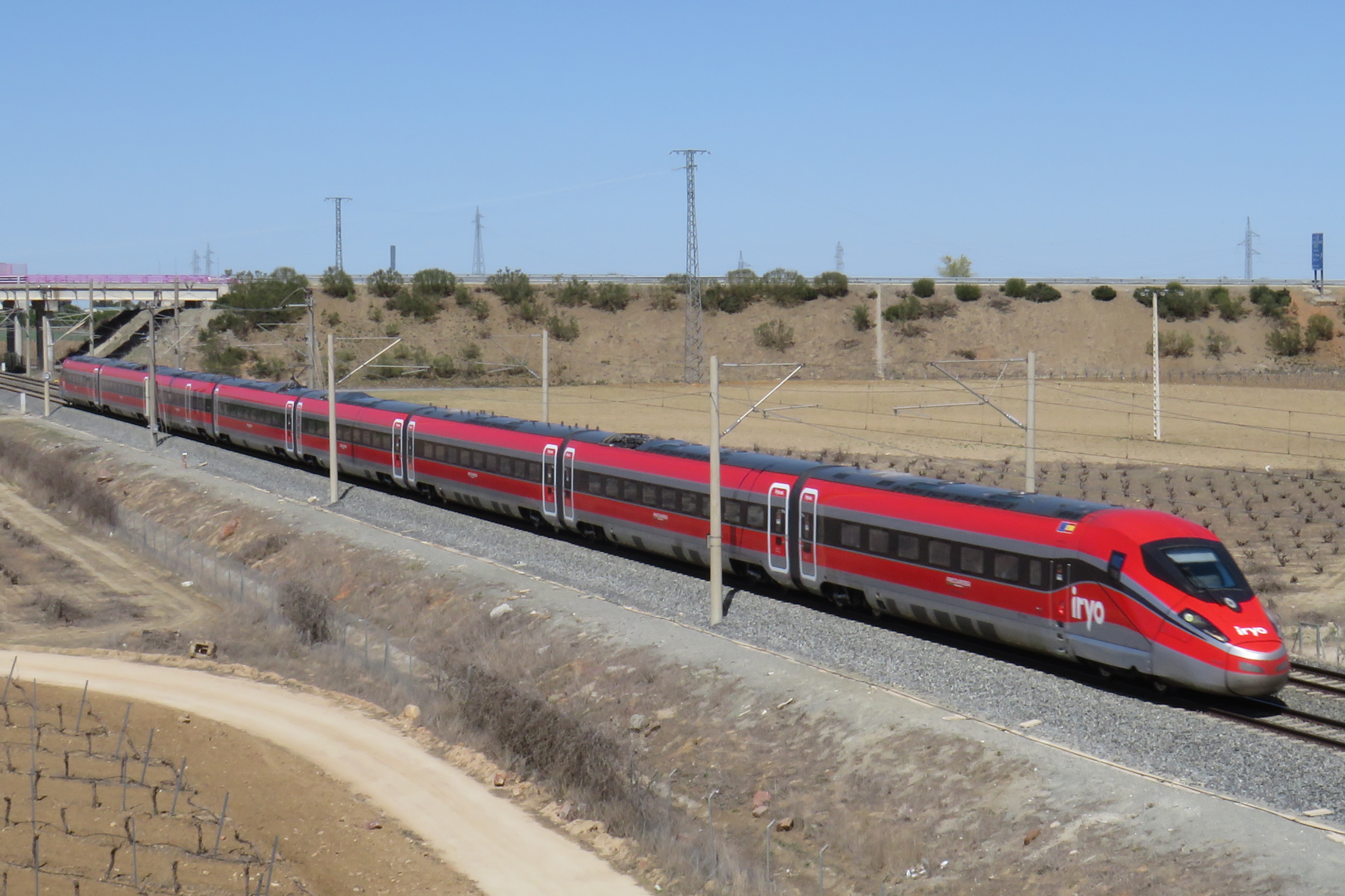

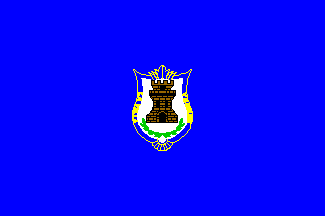
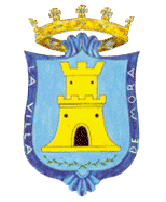
- Flag Coat of arms

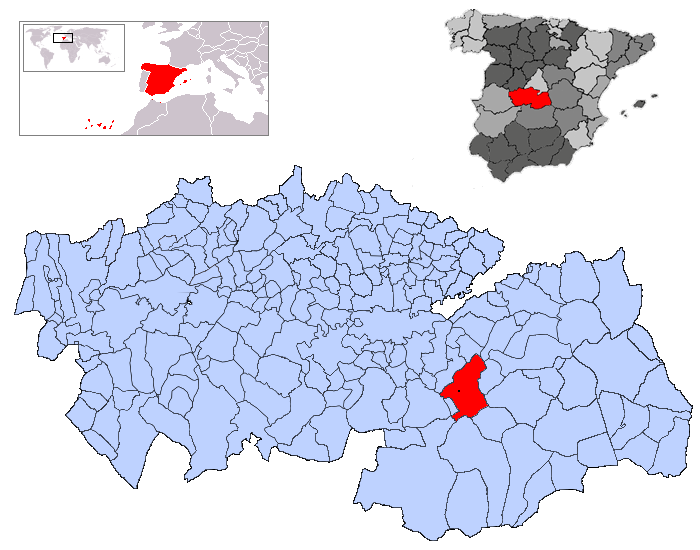
- Locator map for Mora Municipality in Spain
- Coordinates: 39.684°N 3.777°W
- Country: Spain
- Autonomous community: Castile-La Mancha
- Province: Toledo
- Municipality: Mora

Government
  - Mayor (Alcalde): Emilio Bravo Peña (2011)

Area
  - Total: 169.6 km^{2} (65.5 sq mi)
- Elevation: 717 m (2,352 ft)

Population (2025-01-01)
  - Total: 10,064
  - Density: 59.34/km^{2} (153.7/sq mi)
- Time zone: UTC+1 (CET)
  - Summer (DST): UTC+2 (CEST)
- Postal code: 45400
- Website: http://www.mora.es

Town Hall

Mora is a town and municipality in Toledo province, in the autonomous community of Castile-La Mancha, Spain. The area is most famous for the abandoned ruins of the San Marcos de Yegros monastery of the Order of Santiago, located northeast of the town of Mora about 10 km on the Calle de los Dolores in the village of Paraje de Yegros.

== Name ==
The term "Mora" possibly derives from the Latin morum meaning moral. However, Galmés de Fuentes has proposed an earlier origin, indicating that the pre-Roman root mor means "heap of stones" or cairn.

== Geography ==
This town is situated in the Montes de Toledo. It belongs to the region of La Mancha, and borders the municipalities of Villamuelas and Huerta de Valdecarabanos at north, Villanueva de Bogas and Tembleque at east, Turleque, Los Yebenes and Consuegra at south, Orgaz and Manzaneque at west and Mascaraque at northwest.

== Administration ==
| Term | Mayor | Politic Party |
|---|---|---|
| 1979-1983 | Valentín Bravo Martín | UCD |
| 1983-1987 | Valentín Bravo Martín | Independent |
| 1987-1991 | Leocadio Martín Nuñez | PSOE |
| 1991-1995 | Valentín Bravo Martín | PP |
| 1995-1999 | Leocadio Martín Nuñez | PSOE |
| 1999-2003 | Leocadio Martín Nuñez | PSOE |
| 2003-2007 | Leocadio Martín Nuñez | PSOE |
| 2007-2011 | Jose Manuel Villarrubia De La Rosa | PSOE |
| 2011- | Emilio Bravo | PP |

== Demography ==
Demographic Trends

| 1996 | 1998 | 2000 | 2001 | 2002 | 2003 | 2004 | 2005 | 2006 | 2010 |
| 9.312 | 9.339 | 9.371 | 9.519 | 9.587 | 9.722 | 9.814 | 9.994 | 10.072 | 10.516 |
