= Villasequilla =

- Municipality
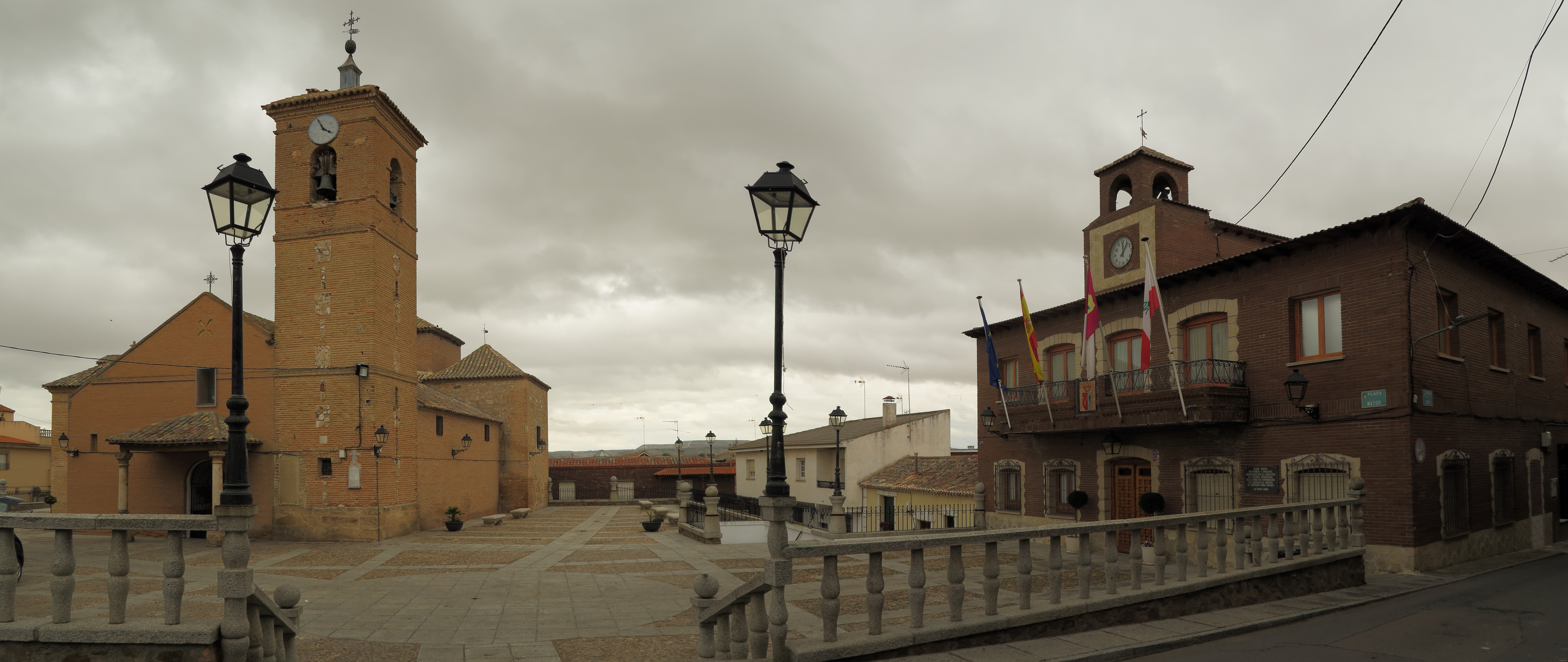
- Town hall

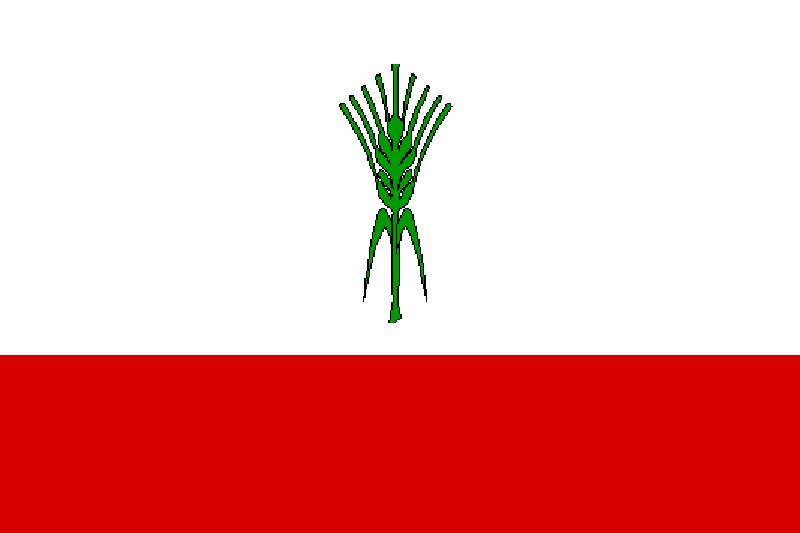
- Flag Coat of arms

- Location in Spain
- Coordinates: 39°53′N 3°43′W
- Country: Spain
- Autonomous community: Castilla–La Mancha
- Province: Toledo
- Municipality: Villasequilla

Area
  - Total: 77 km^{2} (30 sq mi)
- Elevation: 521 m (1,709 ft)

Population (2025-01-01)
  - Total: 2,673
  - Density: 35/km^{2} (90/sq mi)
- Time zone: UTC+1 (CET)
  - Summer (DST): UTC+2 (CEST)

Villasequilla is a municipality located in the province of Toledo, Castilla–La Mancha, Spain. According to the 2006 census (INE), the municipality has a population of 2,515 inhabitants.

== Demographics ==
Historical population
| Year | Pop. | ±% |
|---|---|---|
| 1900 | 1,523 | — |
| 1910 | 1,794 | +17.8% |
| 1920 | 2,070 | +15.4% |
| 1930 | 2,289 | +10.6% |
| 1940 | 1,940 | −15.2% |
| 1950 | 2,373 | +22.3% |
| 1960 | 2,392 | +0.8% |
| 1970 | 2,354 | −1.6% |
| 1981 | 2,298 | −2.4% |
| 1991 | 2,361 | +2.7% |
| 2001 | 2,307 | −2.3% |
| 2011 | 2,664 | +15.5% |
| 2021 | 2,593 | −2.7% |
| 2023 | 2,604 | +0.4% |
Source: ISTAT
