= Cabañas de Yepes =

Coordinates: 39°54′N 3°32′W

Cabañas de Yepes, Spain
- Flag Coat of arms

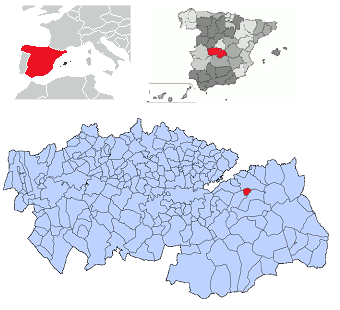
- Country: Spain
- Autonomous community: Castile-La Mancha
- Province: Toledo
- Municipality: Cabañas de Yepes

Area
  - Total: 18 km^{2} (6.9 sq mi)
- Elevation: 700 m (2,300 ft)

Population (2025-01-01)
  - Total: 316
  - Density: 18/km^{2} (45/sq mi)
- Time zone: UTC+1 (CET)
  - Summer (DST): UTC+2 (CEST)

Cabañas de Yepes is a municipality located in the province of Toledo, Castile-La Mancha, Spain. According to the 2006 census (INE), the municipality has a population of 265 inhabitants.

== Demographics ==
Historical population
Year	Pop.	±%
1900	962	—
1910	959	−0.3%
1920	844	−12.0%
1930	889	+5.3%
1940	875	−1.6%
1950	864	−1.3%
1960	850	−1.6%
1970	487	−42.7%
1981	301	−38.2%
1991	249	−17.3%
2001	258	+3.6%
2011	331	+28.3%
2021	301	−9.1%
2023	295	−2.0%
Source: ISTAT
