= La Zarza, Valladolid =

La Zarza
- Municipality
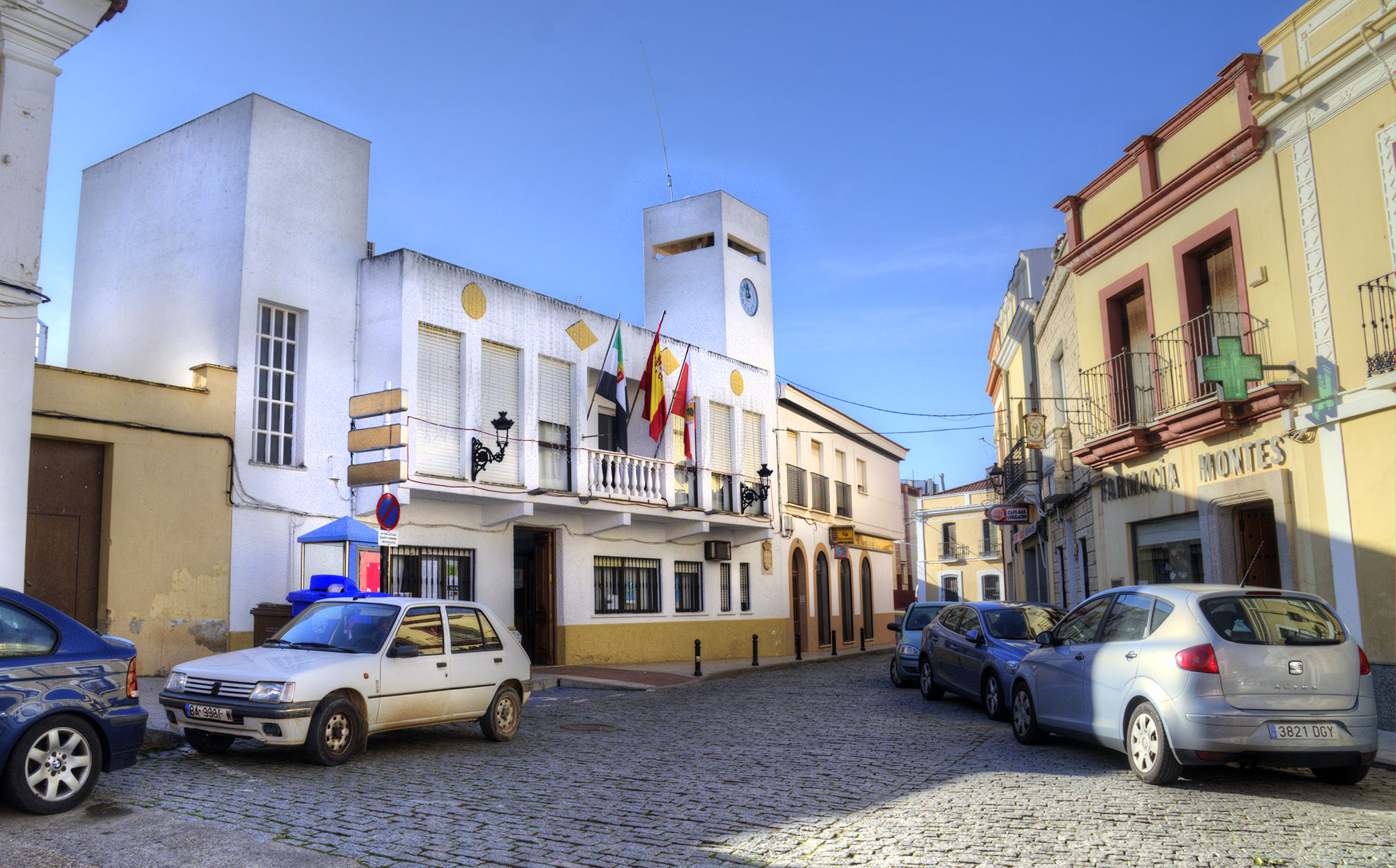
- Town hall

- Location in Spain
- Coordinates: 41°15′41″N 4°46′15″W
- Country: Spain
- Community: Castile and León
- Province: Valladolid

Area
  - Total: 24.03 km^{2} (9.28 sq mi)

Population (2025-01-01)
  - Total: 109
  - Density: 4.54/km^{2} (11.7/sq mi)
- Time zone: UTC+1 (CET)
  - Summer (DST): UTC+2 (CEST)

La Zarza is a municipality located in the province of Valladolid, Castile and León, Spain.
