= Algodor =

- Settlement
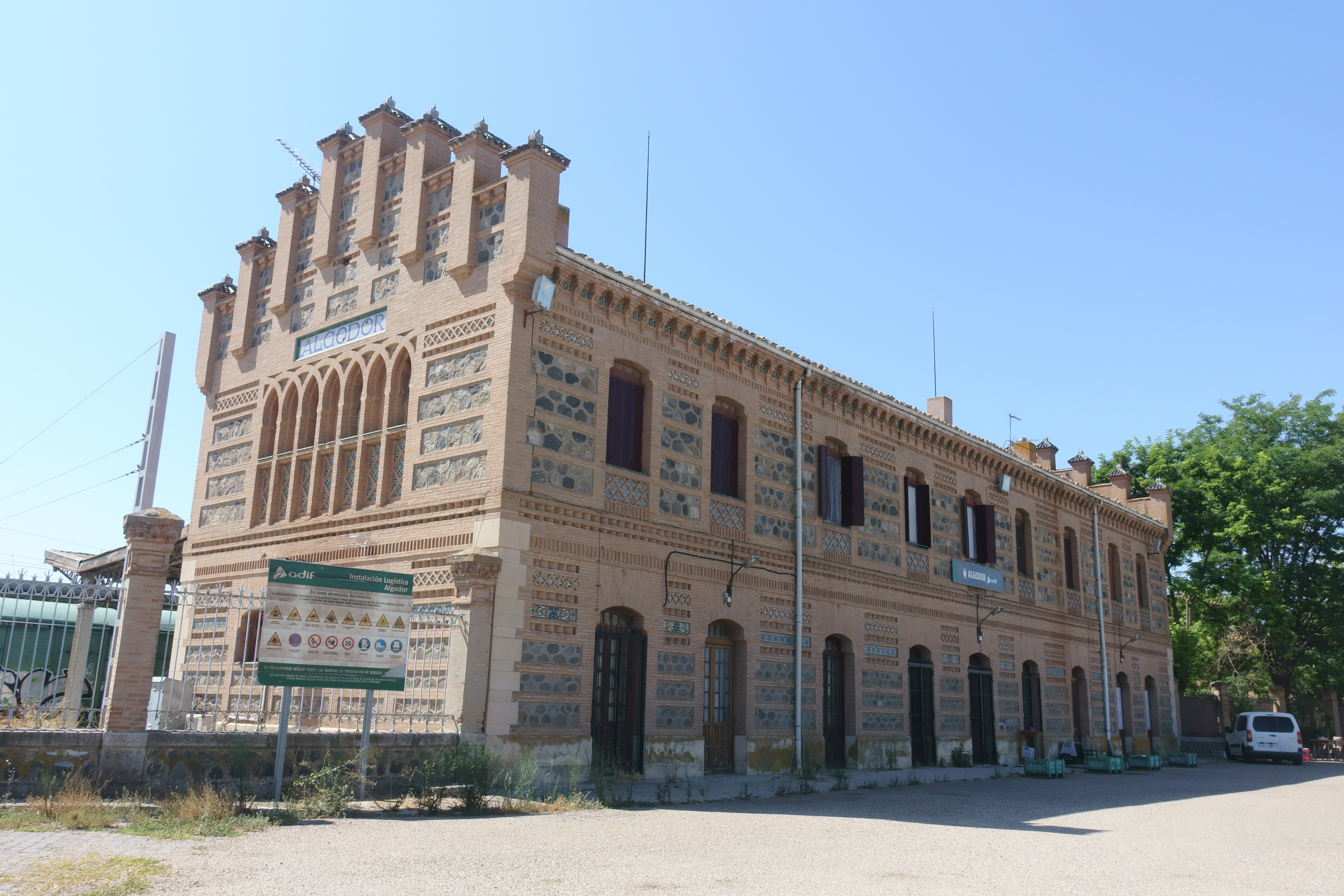
- Algodor Railway Station
- Interactive map of Algodor
- Coordinates: 39.9129552°N 3.8810376°W
- Country: Spain
- Community: Community of Madrid
- Municipality: Aranjuez

Population
  - Total: 14

Algodor is a small settlement between Toledo and Aranjuez, Spain. The locality is within the municipal limits of Aranjuez and is in the Community of Madrid.

Algodor developed as a railway town. It has a population of 14, but in its heyday in the 1920s there were more inhabitants and the community was provided with a school and a chapel.

== Railway heritage ==
The most significant building is the railway station, designed by Narciso Claveria in Neo-Mudéjar style. Replacing a more modest facility, it was erected in the 1920s by the railway company "Ferrocarriles de Madrid a Zaragoza y Alicante" (often known by its initials MZA). The station has become redundant since the opening of the Madrid–Toledo high-speed rail line in 2005. The old line between Aranjuez and Toledo has closed and there is less traffic passing through Algodor.

Between 1932 and 2000 an Italian hydraulic system, developed by Bianchi and Servettaz, was used to control points switching and signalling. Part of this system is now on display at the Railway Museum, Madrid, in a replica signal box.

== Ecology ==
The stretch of the Tagus valley near Aranjuez is a good place to observe butterflies and other wildlife. Algodor can be used as a starting point for trails exploring the area.

== See also ==
- Algodor River
