= Zarza de Tajo =

Municipality of Spain

- Municipality
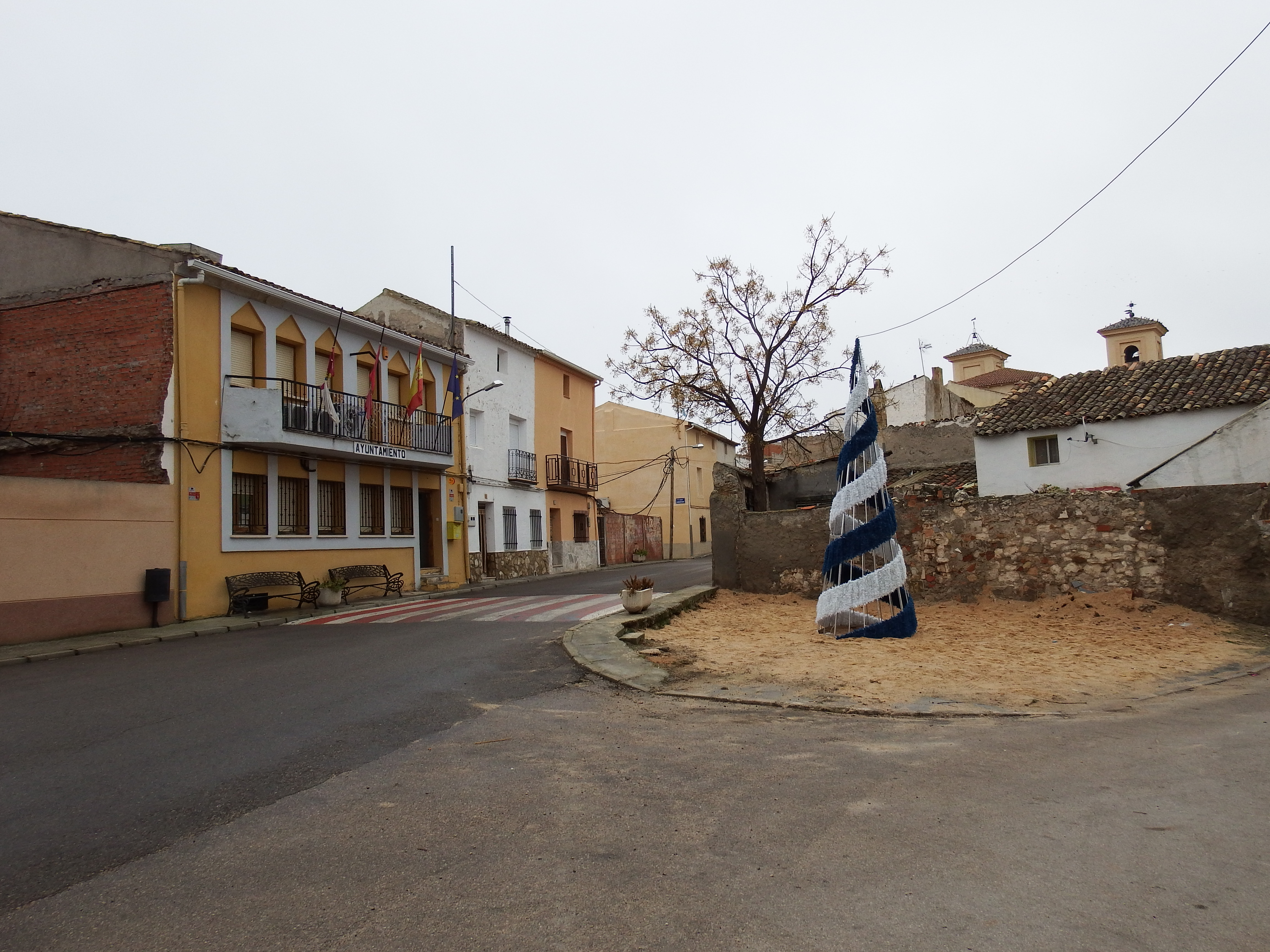

- Coat of arms

- Location within Spain Location within Castilla-La Mancha
- Coordinates: 40°02′N 3°08′W
- Country: Spain
- Autonomous community: Castile-La Mancha
- Province: Cuenca

Population (2025-01-01)
  - Total: 320
- Time zone: UTC+1 (CET)
  - Summer (DST): UTC+2 (CEST)

Zarza de Tajo is a municipality in located in the province of Cuenca, Castile-La Mancha, Spain. It has a population of 254.

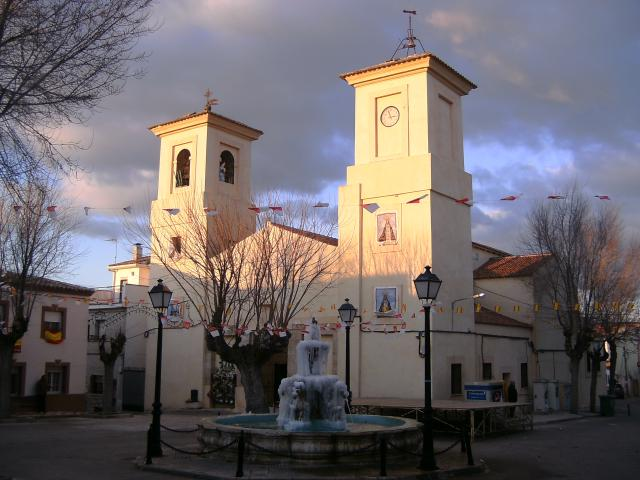
