= Dosbarrios =

Coordinates: 39°52′N 3°29′W

- municipality
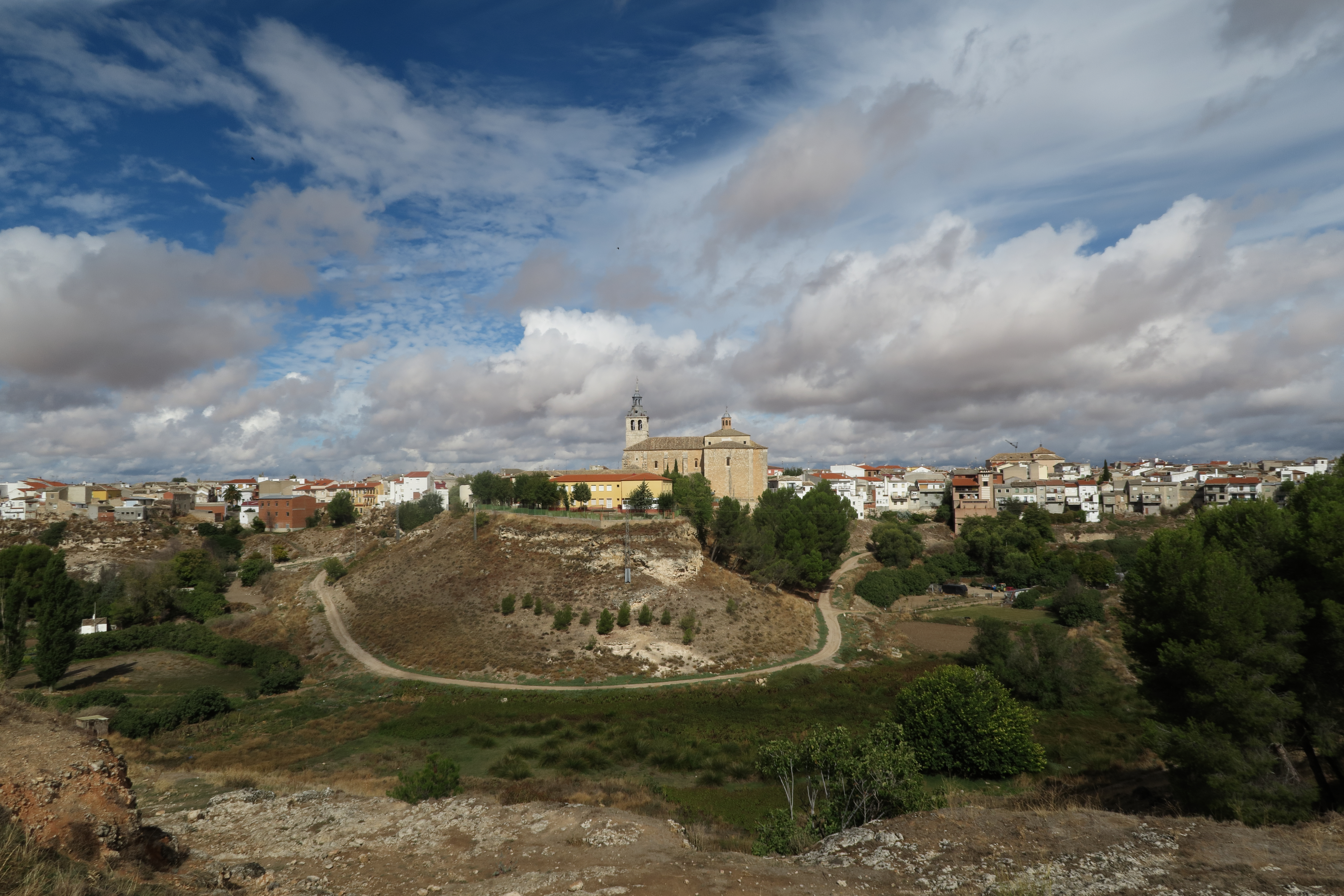

- Flag Coat of arms
- Interactive map of Dosbarrios
- Country: Spain
- Autonomous community: Castile-La Mancha
- Province: Toledo
- Municipality: Dosbarrios

Area
  - Total: 112 km^{2} (43 sq mi)
- Elevation: 711 m (2,333 ft)

Population (2025-01-01)
  - Total: 2,228
  - Density: 19.9/km^{2} (51.5/sq mi)
- Time zone: UTC+1 (CET)
  - Summer (DST): UTC+2 (CEST)

Dosbarrios is a municipality located in the province of Toledo, Castile-La Mancha, Spain. According to the 2006 census (INE), the municipality has a population of 2280 inhabitants.

== Demographics ==
Historical population
| Year | Pop. | ±% |
|---|---|---|
| 1900 | 2,405 | — |
| 1910 | 2,549 | +6.0% |
| 1920 | 2,692 | +5.6% |
| 1930 | 2,815 | +4.6% |
| 1940 | 2,625 | −6.7% |
| 1950 | 2,777 | +5.8% |
| 1960 | 2,581 | −7.1% |
| 1970 | 2,257 | −12.6% |
| 1981 | 2,095 | −7.2% |
| 1991 | 1,941 | −7.4% |
| 2001 | 2,085 | +7.4% |
| 2011 | 2,381 | +14.2% |
| 2021 | 2,263 | −5.0% |
| 2023 | 2,223 | −1.8% |
Source: INE
