= Ocaña, Spain =

Ocaña
- Municipality
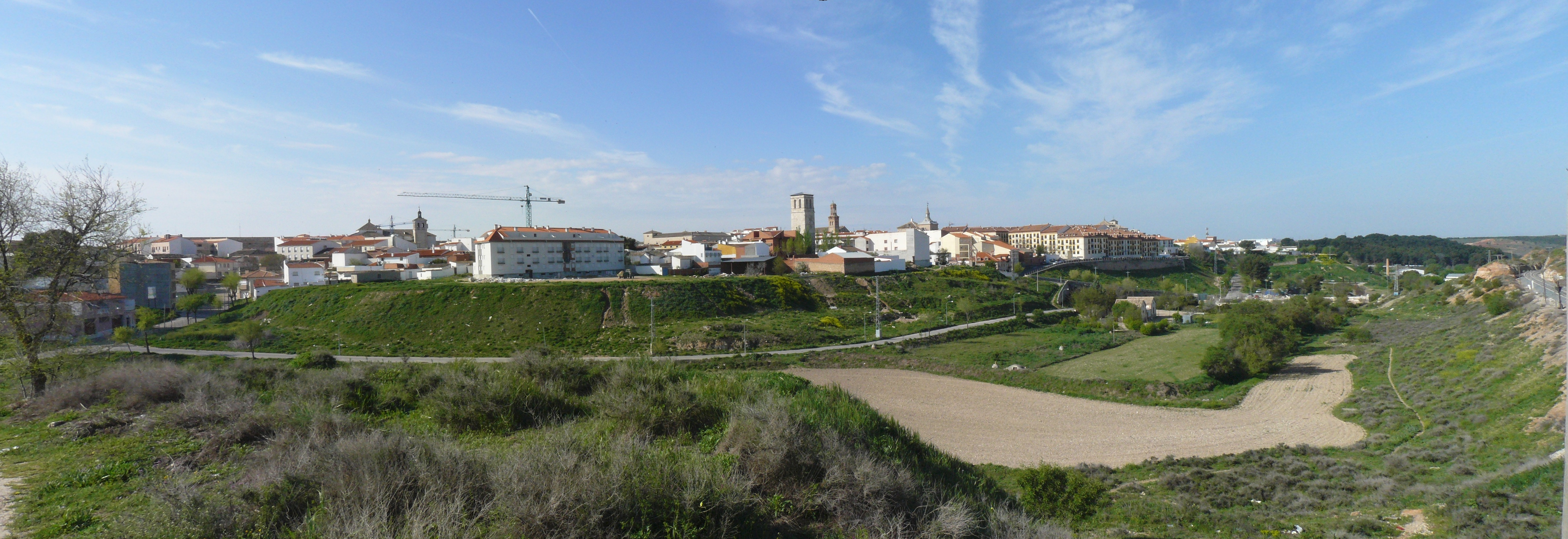
- Panoramic view of Ocaña

- Flag Coat of arms

- Location in Spain
- Coordinates: 39°57′25″N 3°29′48″W
- Country: Spain
- Autonomous community: Castilla–La Mancha
- Province: Toledo

Government
  - Mayor: Remedios Gordo Hernández

Area
  - Total: 147.9 km^{2} (57.1 sq mi)
- Elevation: 730 m (2,400 ft)

Population (2025-01-01)
  - Total: 15,560
  - Density: 105.2/km^{2} (272.5/sq mi)
- Demonym: Ocañenses
- Time zone: UTC+1 (CET)
  - Summer (DST): UTC+2 (CEST)
- Postal code: 45300

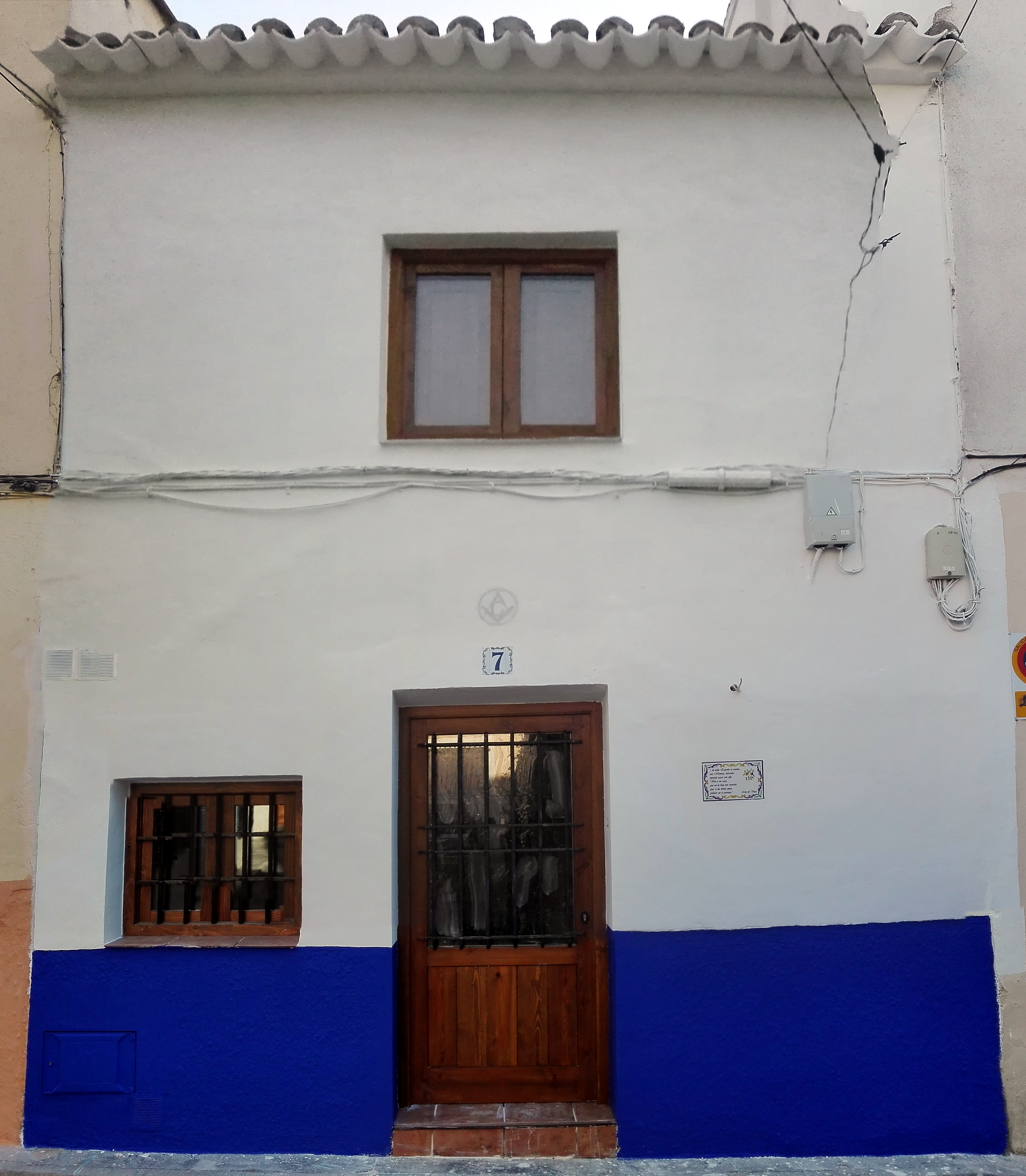
Typical house building "la Mancha" style in Ocaña, in "chalk white" and "añil" blue.

Ocaña is a municipality of Spain, in the province of Toledo, Castilla–La Mancha.

== Toponymy ==
The term Ocaña seems to have the base word olca- that originates from the Celtiberian 'fertile ground, meadow', and could have evolved into: Olcania > Ocania < Ocaña. There are other theories, like the one by Nieto Ballester, who states that Ocaña is a pre-Roman term, maybe Indo-European, but not Celtic. On the other hand, Menéndez Pidal quotes the name of Ocaña to support his thesis of the Ligurian substratum in the Iberian Peninsula.

== Geography ==
Ocaña is located on the tableland known as Mesa de Ocaña, in the northeast of the province of Toledo, in the central part of the Iberian Peninsula. The Mesa de Ocaña is bordered to the north by the Tagus, to the west by the Martín Román and Algodor rivers, to the east by the glacis of Tarancón, and to the south by La Mancha, of which it is however often considered to be a subsector. Located at about 730 metres above mean sea level, Ocaña has an average annual precipitation of about 466 mm.

== History ==
Ocaña is the Vicus Cuminarius of the Romans.

The territory of Ocaña passed to Christian rule in the 11th century, most probably in the context of the conquest of Toledo. Ocaña and the land of Oreja were however conquered afterwards by the Almoravids, returning to Christian control in 1139, and the organization of settlement policy had to wait until 1156.

The Order of Calatrava established an encomienda ('commandery') in Ocaña in 1176. In 1182, the Order of Santiago obtained Ocaña from the Order of Calatrava in exchange for Alcubilla and an annual rent from the salt mines of Espartinas. The friars of the Order of Santiago soon established the seat of an encomienda, and held control over Ocaña throughout the remaining of the Middle Ages. The local Jewry consolidated in the 14h century and it grew further in the 15th century. By 1492, it amounted to about 1,500 Jews. From then on, Ocaña hosted a numerous judeoconverso population dedicated to artisan activities.

By the early 16th century, Ocaña had consolidated as a hub of artisan activity, including the craftmanship of reputed perfumed gloves. By the end of the 16th century, the once thriving glove-making industry entered into decadence. Soap factories also declined, but, unlike the former, did not fully disappear.

The town hosted a notable morisco community through the 16th century, which increased upon the arrival of 279 deported Granadan moriscos in the aftermath of the Alpujarras War. About 1,518 moriscos were reportedly expelled from the town in 1610.

In 1809, in the aftermath of the nearby Battle of Ocaña, the French Imperial Army pillaged Ocaña.

== Main sights ==
- Convent of Santa Catalina de Siena, in Renaissance style
- Convent of St. Dominic, in Renaissance style (1535–1605)
- Fuente Grande ("Great Spring"), built in the 16th century
- Fuente Vieja ("Old Spring"), probably of Roman origins
- Parish church of Santa María de la Asunción, built over a 12th-century mosque
- Parish church of St. John the Baptist (13th century)
- Convent of the Carmelites (16th century)
- Palacio de los Cárdenas (16th century)
- Rollo de Justicia (15th century)

== Transportation ==
Ocaña is a major hub in the Spanish motorway network. The autovías A-4 and A-40 and toll roads R-4 and AP-36 all intersect each other at Ocaña. In addition, the Madrid–Levante high-speed rail line passes by Ocaña, but does not have a station there.

== Notable people ==
- Liu Zhou Linchao (born 2003), Spanish professional footballer
