= Villatobas =

- Municipality
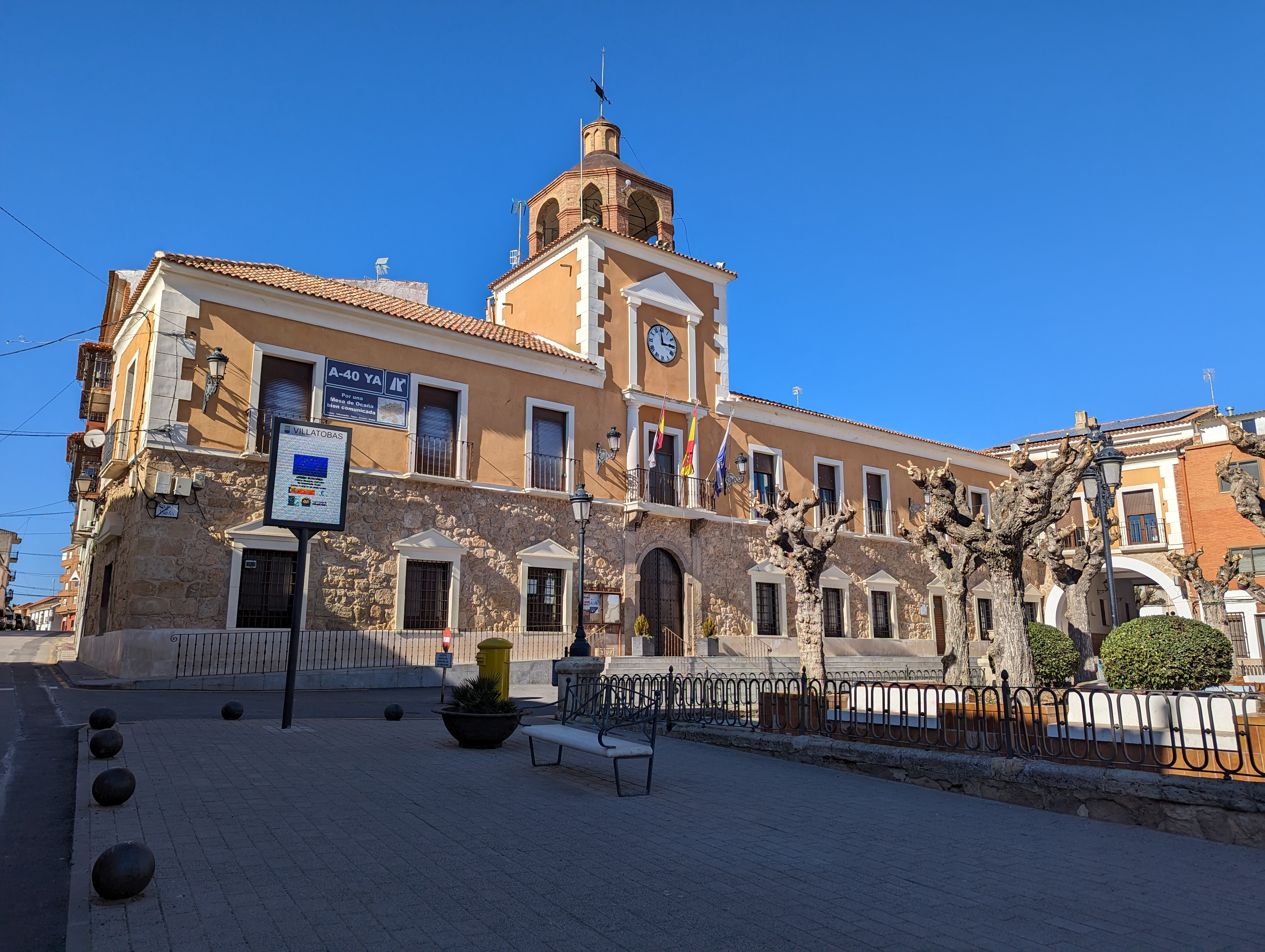
- Town hall

- Flag Coat of arms

- Location in Spain
- Coordinates: 39°54′N 3°20′W
- Country: Spain
- Autonomous community: Castile-La Mancha
- Province: Toledo
- Municipality: Villatobas

Area
  - Total: 181 km^{2} (70 sq mi)
- Elevation: 723 m (2,372 ft)

Population (2025-01-01)
  - Total: 2,964
  - Density: 16.4/km^{2} (42.4/sq mi)
- Time zone: UTC+1 (CET)
  - Summer (DST): UTC+2 (CEST)

Villatobas is a municipality located in the province of Toledo, Castile-La Mancha, Spain. According to the 2006 census (INE), the municipality has a population of 2,481 inhabitants.

== Demographics ==
Historical population
Year	Pop.	±%
1900	3,165	—
1910	3,523	+11.3%
1920	3,727	+5.8%
1930	4,089	+9.7%
1940	4,038	−1.2%
1950	4,159	+3.0%
1960	3,707	−10.9%
1970	2,859	−22.9%
1981	2,697	−5.7%
1991	2,451	−9.1%
2001	2,261	−7.8%
2011	2,745	+21.4%
2021	2,570	−6.4%
2023	2,753	+7.1%
Source: ISTAT
