= Villarrubia de Santiago =

- Municipality
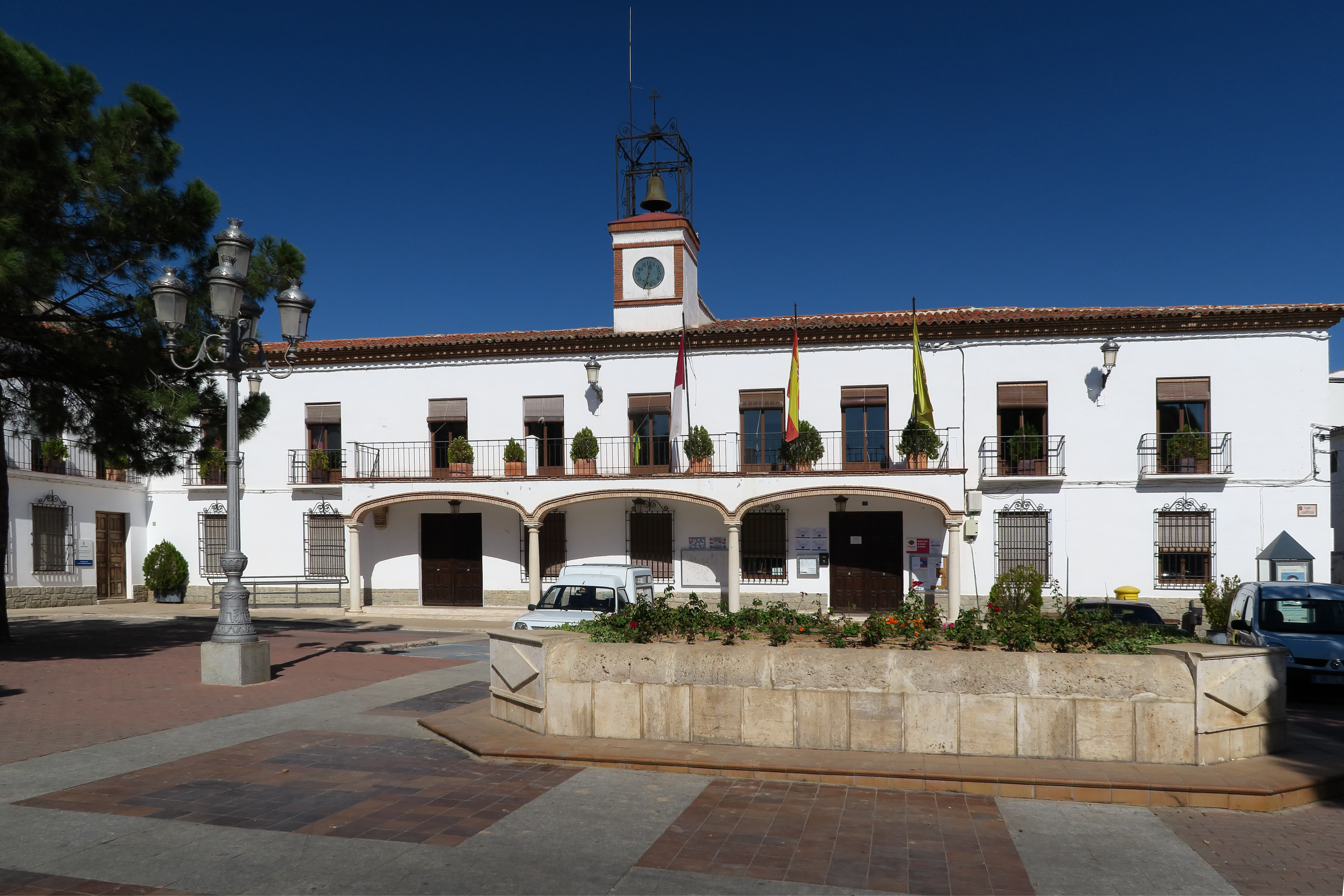
- Town hall

- Coat of arms

- Location in Spain
- Coordinates: 39°59′N 3°22′W
- Country: Spain
- Autonomous community: Castile-La Mancha
- Province: Toledo
- Municipality: Villarrubia de Santiago

Area
  - Total: 155 km^{2} (60 sq mi)
- Elevation: 750 m (2,460 ft)

Population (2025-01-01)
  - Total: 2,583
  - Density: 16.7/km^{2} (43.2/sq mi)
- Time zone: UTC+1 (CET)
  - Summer (DST): UTC+2 (CEST)

Villarrubia de Santiago is a municipality located in the province of Toledo, Castile-La Mancha, Spain. According to the 2006 census (INE), the municipality has a population of 2,893 inhabitants.
