= Turleque =

Coordinates: 39°50′N 5°13′W

Torrico
- municipality
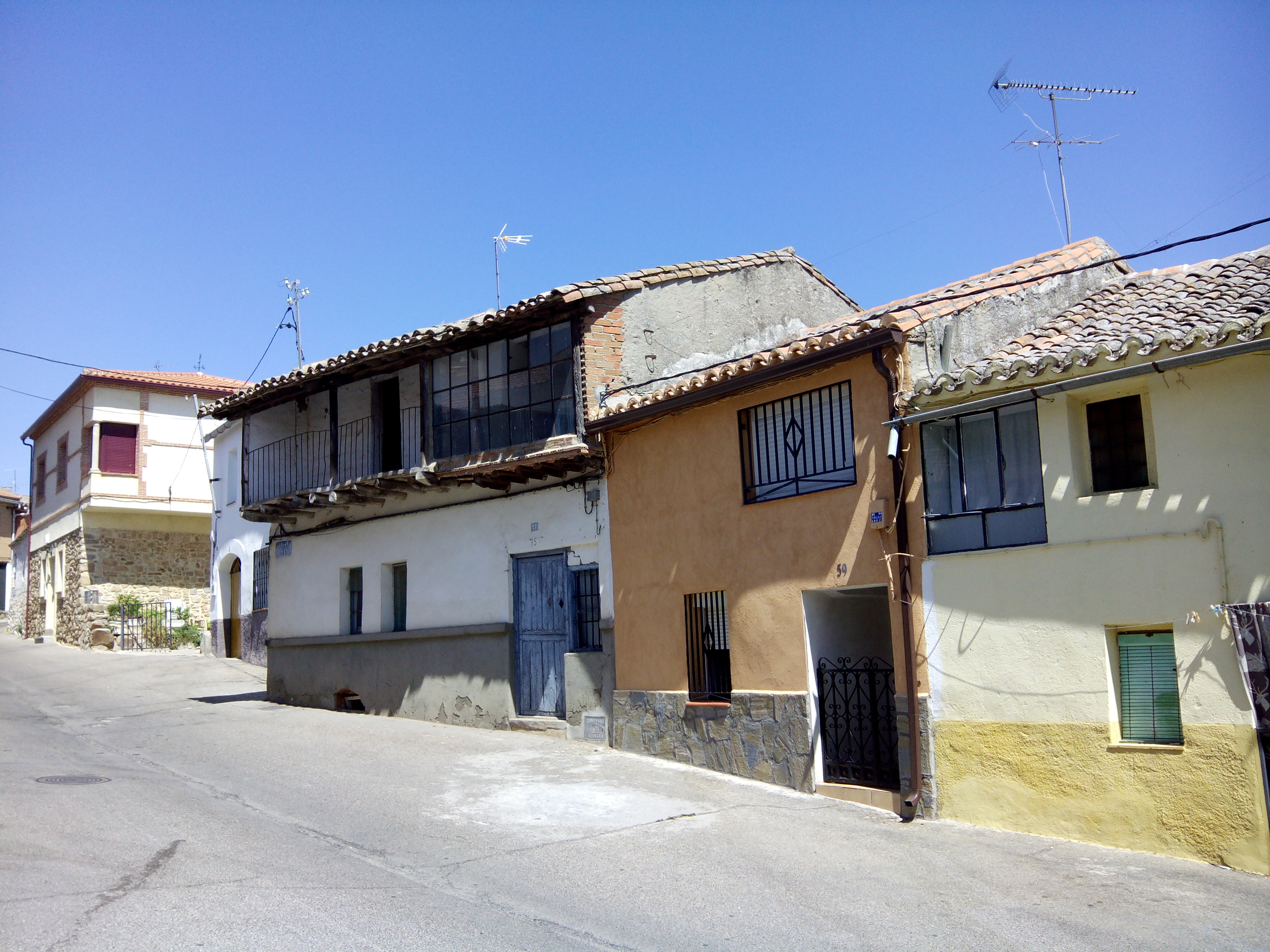

- Coat of arms
- Interactive map of Torrico
- Country: Spain
- Autonomous community: Castile-La Mancha
- Province: Toledo
- Municipality: Torrico

Area
  - Total: 34 km^{2} (13 sq mi)
- Elevation: 445 m (1,460 ft)

Population (2025-01-01)
  - Total: 702
  - Density: 21/km^{2} (53/sq mi)
- Time zone: UTC+1 (CET)
  - Summer (DST): UTC+2 (CEST)

Torrico is a municipality located in the province of Toledo, Castile-La Mancha, Spain. According to the 2006 census (INE), the municipality has a population of 831 inhabitants.

== Demographics ==
Historical population
Year	Pop.	±%
1900	1,251	—
1910	1,332	+6.5%
1920	1,448	+8.7%
1930	1,743	+20.4%
1940	1,770	+1.5%
1950	2,095	+18.4%
1960	2,139	+2.1%
1970	1,420	−33.6%
1981	1,160	−18.3%
1991	1,008	−13.1%
2001	881	−12.6%
2011	892	+1.2%
2021	696	−22.0%
2023	701	+0.7%
Source: INE
