= Villamuelas =

- Municipality
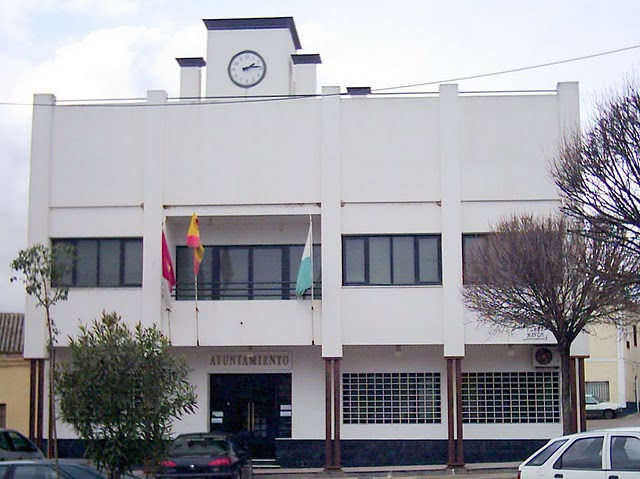
- Town hall

- Flag Coat of arms

- Location in Spain
- Coordinates: 39°48′N 3°43′W
- Country: Spain
- Autonomous community: Castile-La Mancha
- Province: Toledo
- Municipality: Villamuelas

Area
  - Total: 43 km^{2} (17 sq mi)
- Elevation: 600 m (2,000 ft)

Population (2025-01-01)
  - Total: 587
  - Density: 14/km^{2} (35/sq mi)
- Time zone: UTC+1 (CET)
  - Summer (DST): UTC+2 (CEST)
- Website: www.villamuelas.es

Villamuelas is a municipality located in the province of Toledo, Castile-La Mancha, Spain. According to the 2006 census (INE), the municipality has a population of 737 inhabitants.
