= Villanueva de Bogas =

- Municipality
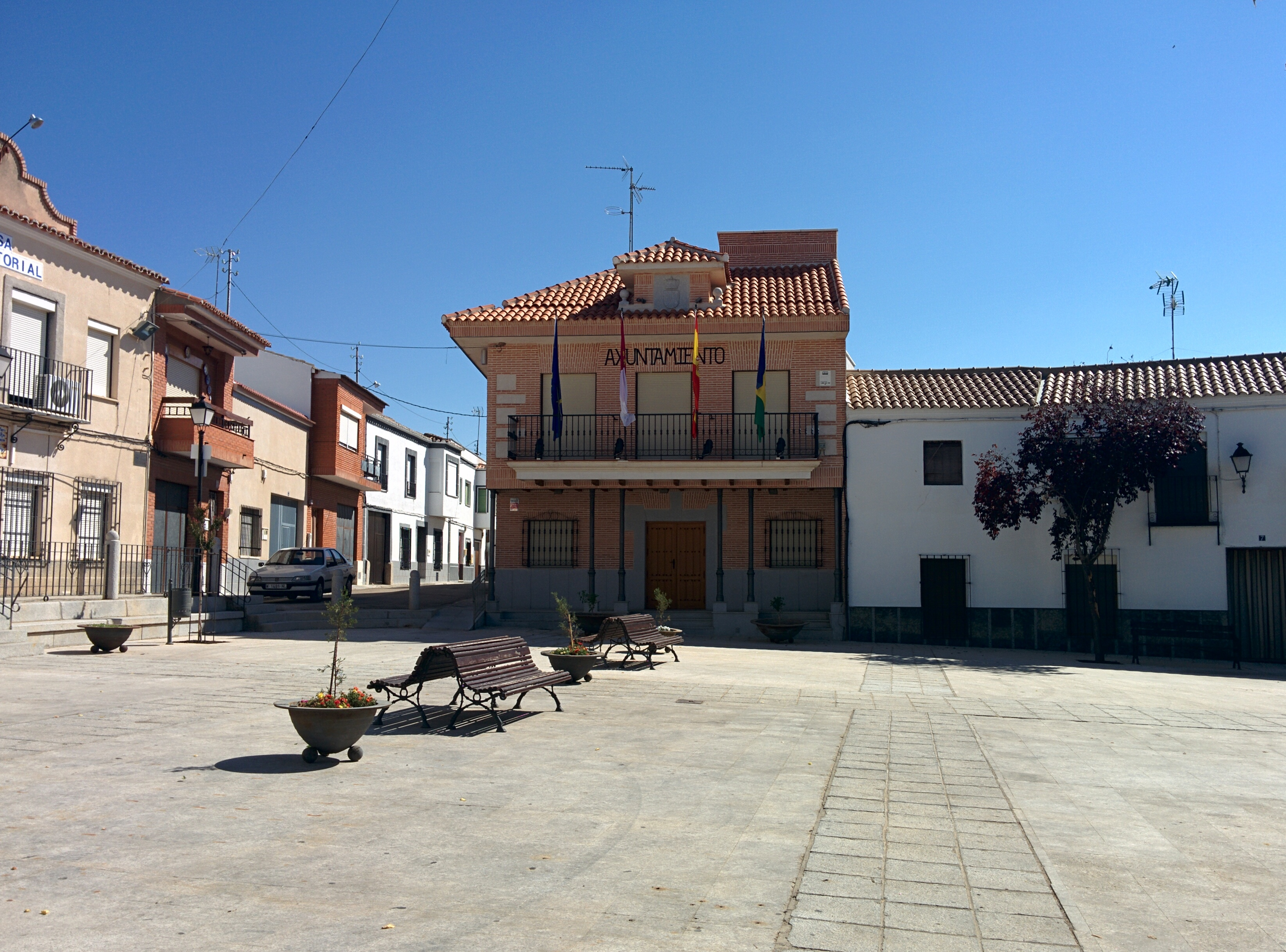
- Town hall

- Flag Coat of arms

- Location in Spain
- Coordinates: 39°43′N 3°39′W
- Country: Spain
- Autonomous community: Castile-La Mancha
- Province: Toledo
- Municipality: Villanueva de Bogas

Area
  - Total: 57 km^{2} (22 sq mi)
- Elevation: 652 m (2,139 ft)

Population (2025-01-01)
  - Total: 657
  - Density: 12/km^{2} (30/sq mi)
- Time zone: UTC+1 (CET)
  - Summer (DST): UTC+2 (CEST)

Villanueva de Bogas is a municipality located in the province of Toledo, Castile-La Mancha, Spain. According to the 2006 census (INE), the municipality has a population of 805 inhabitants.
