= Huerta de Valdecarábanos =

Coordinates: 39°52′N 3°37′W

- Municipality
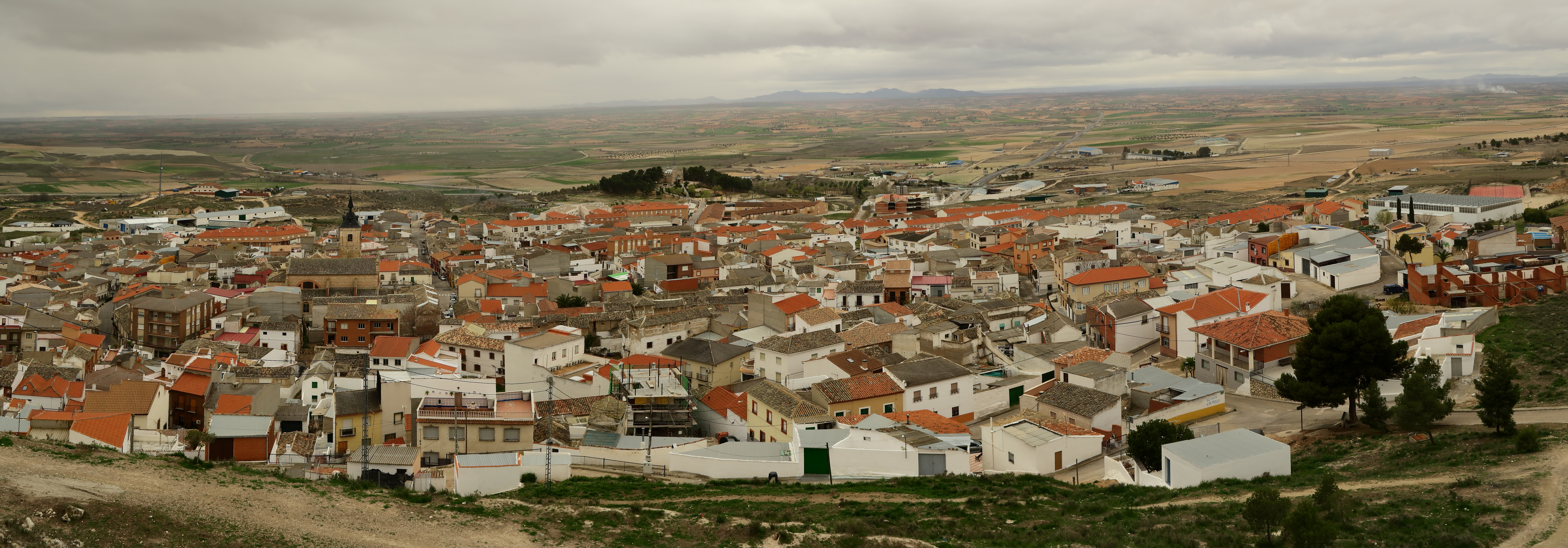
- View from the castle ruins

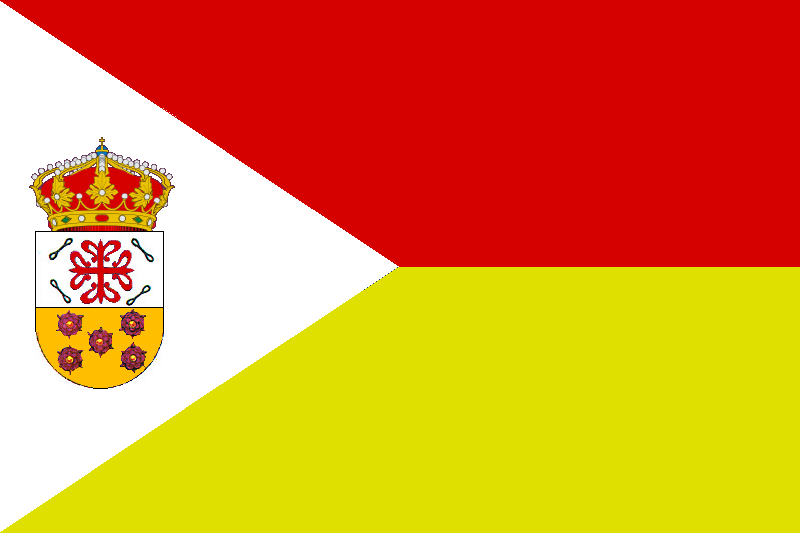
- Flag Coat of arms
- Interactive map of Huerta de Valdecarábanos
- Country: Spain
- Autonomous community: Castile-La Mancha
- Province: Toledo

Area
  - Total: 83 km^{2} (32 sq mi)
- Elevation: 620 m (2,030 ft)

Population (2025-01-01)
  - Total: 1,836
  - Density: 22/km^{2} (57/sq mi)
- Time zone: UTC+1 (CET)
  - Summer (DST): UTC+2 (CEST)

Huerta de Valdecarábanos is a municipality located in the province of Toledo, Castile-La Mancha, Spain. According to the 2006 census (INE), the municipality has a population of 1,784 inhabitants.
