= Military career and honours of Francisco Franco =

Coat of Arms of Francisco Franco until 1940

Coat of Arms of Francisco Franco as Head of the Spanish State, depicting the Castilian Bend, the Pillars of Hercules and the Laureate Cross

The military career of Francisco Franco Bahamonde began on 29 August 1907, when he took the oath as a cadet at the Spanish Toledo Infantry Academy. On 13 July 1910 he graduated from Infantry Academy and was commissioned as a second lieutenant in the Spanish Army, in the same promotion as Juan Yagüe, Emilio Esteban Infantes, Camilo Alonso Vega, José Asensio, Lisardo Doval Bravo and Eduardo Sáenz de Buruaga. He rose through the ranks over the next twenty years and became one of the most important Spanish commissioned officers of the Rif War. On 31 January 1926 Franco, aged 33, became the youngest general in all of Europe. In January 1928 he was then chosen to direct the newly formed General Military Academy in Zaragoza. From 19 May 1935 to 23 February 1936, Franco was elevated to Chief of Army Staff before the 1936 election moved the leftist Popular Front into power, relegating him to the Canary Islands as Commander of the Archipelago Force. After initial reluctance, he joined the July 1936 military coup which, after failing to take Spain, sparked the Spanish Civil War.

During the war, he commandeered Spain's colonial army in Africa and after the death of much of the rebel leadership became his faction's only leader. On 1 October 1936, in Burgos, Franco was appointed Generalissimo and Head of State. He consolidated all nationalist parties into the FET y de las JONS (creating a one-party state). Three years later the Nationalists declared victory and thereafter ruled over Spain from 1939 until his death in 1975 assuming the title Caudillo.

== Styles ==
- 3 August (Note: Officially since 17 September 1936.) – 30 September 1936: "The Most Excellent Divisional general Francisco Franco Bahamonde, Member of the National Defence Board."
- 30 September – 1 October 1936: "His Excellency the Head of the State Government and Generalissimo of the Armies.
- 1 October – 19 December 1936: "His Excellency the Head of the State and Generalissimo of the Armies.
- 19 December 1936 – † 20 November 1975 : "His Excellency the Head of the State, Caudillo of Spain and the Crusade, Generalissimo of the Armies. (Note: Disputed until 1939 (Civil War).) (Note: Perpetually at the head of the ranks of the Army, Navy and Air Force, Decree 3269/1975, 5 December. BOE - Spanish Official Journal no. 304, 19 December 1975, p. 26362.)

== Nicknames ==
The Víctor other personal emblem used by Franco

- Homo missus a Deo (A man sent from God).
- Providential man
- Sentinel of the West
- Crusader of the West
- Prince of the armies
- The cleanest sword of the West/Europe
- Supreme captain of the Race
- Undefeated Caesar
- Saviour of the Fatherland/Spain
- The only victor against Marxism on the field of battle
- The youngest general in Europe
- Little light of El Pardo

== Dates of rank ==
- 29 August 1907 – 13 July 1910: Gentleman Cadet
- 13 July 1910 – 13 July 1912: Second Lieutenant
- 13 June 1912 – 15 March 1915: First Lieutenant
- 15 March 1915 – 29 June 1918: Captain (Note: War merit for promotion.)
- 29 June 1918 – 31 January 1924: Commandant
- 31 January 1924 – 7 February 1925: Lieutenant Colonel
- 7 February 1925 – 31 January 1926: Colonel
- 31 January 1926 – 29 March 1934: Brigade General
- 29 March 1934 – 18 July 1938: Divisional General
- 30 September 1936 – † 20 November 1975: Generalissimo of the Armies
  - 18 July 1938 – † 20 November 1975: Captain General, Army
  - 18 July 1938 – † 20 November 1975: Captain General, Navy
  - 7 October 1939 – † 20 November 1975: Captain General, Air Force

== List of assignment ==
- 23 July 1910 – 6 February 1912: Second Lieutenant, 8th Infantry Regiment «Zamora»
- 19 February 1912 – 15 April 1913: Second and First Lieutenant, 68th Infantry Regiment «África»
- 15 April 1913 – 26 March 1915: First Lieutenant, 1st Indigenous Regular Forces of Melilla
- 26 March – 7 April 1915: Captain, Square for Service Eventualities in Ceuta
- 7 April 1915 – 1 January 1917: Captain, 1st Indigenous Regular Forces of Melilla
- 1 January – 1 March 1917: Captain, 1st Group of Indigenous Regular Forces of Tétouan
- 1 March 1917 – 27 September 1920 Commandant, 3rd Infantry Regiment «Príncipe»
- 27 September 1920 – 8 June 1923: Chief of the 1st Flag of the Foreigners Tercio
- 8 June 1923 – 11 February 1926: Chief of the Volunteers Tercio
- 29 April 1926 – 8 January 1928: Chief of the 1st Infantry Brigade, 1st Division
- 8 January 1928 – 30 June 1931: Director of the General Military Academy
- 5 February 1932 – 29 March 1934: Chief of the 15th Infantry Brigade
- 29 March 1934 – 15 February 1935: Balearics General Commander (Note: Destined in a higher level assignment.)
- 15 February – 19 May 1935: High Chief of the Military Force in Morocco
- 19 May 1935 – 23 February 1936: Chief of Army Staff
- 23 February – 25 July 1936: (Note: Disputed (At Civil War). Ceased by the government on 19 July.) Canary General Commander
- 25 July – 27 August 1936: General of the Army in Morocco and the Southern Spain
- 27 August – 30 September 1936: Chief of the Military Force in Morocco and the Expeditionary Force
- 30 September 1936 – † 20 November 1975: Commander-in-chief of the Armies/Spanish Armed Forces

== Awards ==
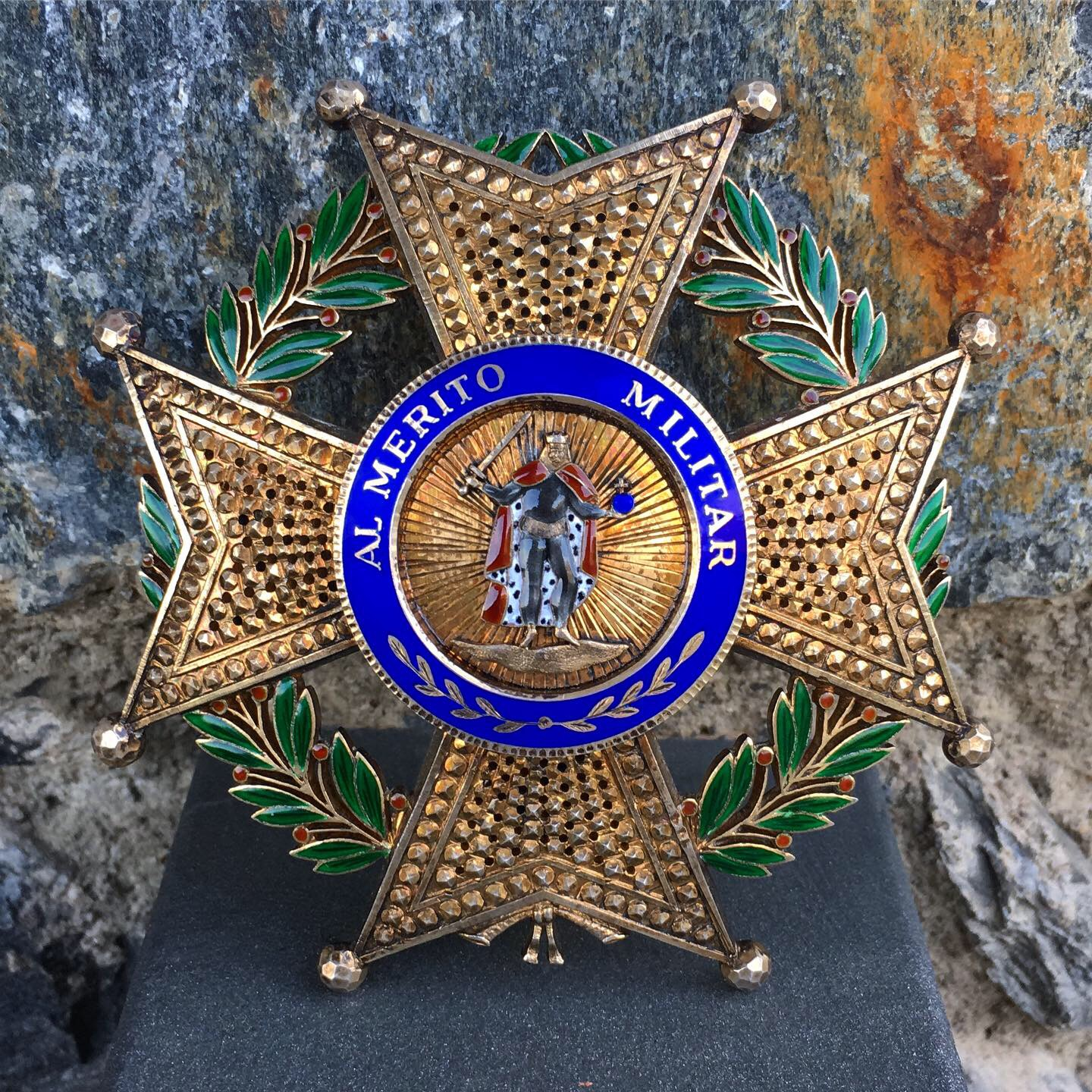
Laureate Grand Cross of Saint Ferdinand, borne by Francisco Franco

Badge of the Tercio (without bars)

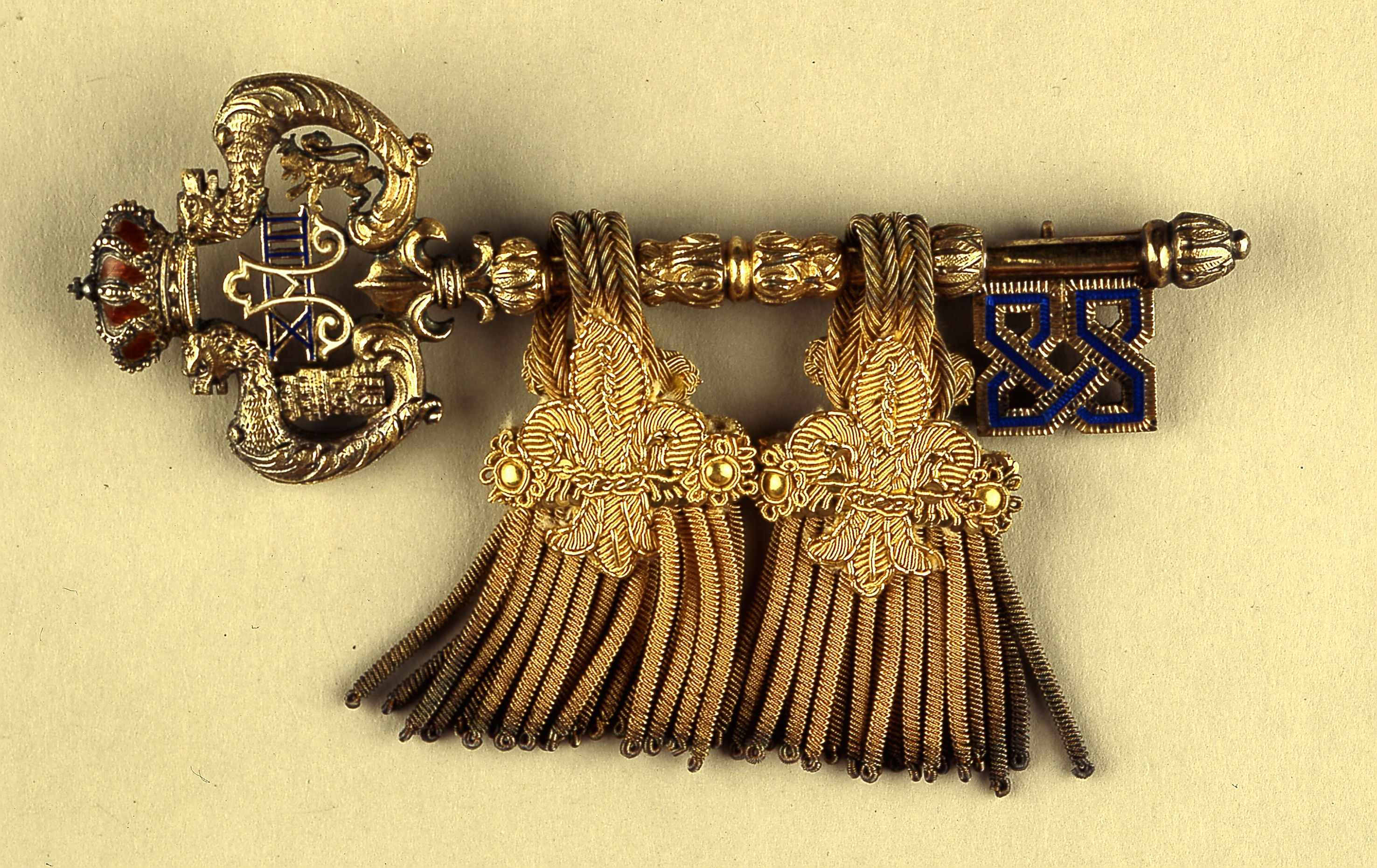
Insignia of the Gentlemen of the Bedchamber, reign of Alfonso XIII

Military Decorations
Chief and Laureate Grand Cross of the Military Order of Saint Ferdinand	
Individual Military Medal	Two clasps
1st Class Cross (Star) of the Royal and Military Order of María Cristina	Two clasps
War Grand Cross	
Grand Cross of Military Merit with white badge	
Grand Cross of Aeronautical Merit with white badge	
Chief and Grand Cross of the Military Order of Saint Hermenegild	
3rd Cross Class (Star) of the Military Merit with red badge (Note: Numbering of the classes was inverse to the usual order until 1939.)	
3rd Cross Class (Star) of the Naval Merit with red badge (Note: Numbering of the classes was inverse to the usual order until 1931.)	
2nd Class Cross (Star) of the Military Merit with red badge	Three times
Suffering for the Motherland Medal (Note: Class for Wounded or Injured at War by the Enemy)	
Commander with Star of the Military Order of Saint Hermenegild	
1st Class Cross (crowned simple cross with ribbon) of Military Merit with red badge	Four times
Cross of the Military Order of Saint Hermenegild	
(Military) Medal of Melilla	Kert, Beur Bu-Gafar and Tétouan clasps
Medal of the Peace of Morocco	
The Tercio Campaigns Medal (Note: Campaign Commemorative Medal, Morocco clasp. Created on 17 November 1931 and repealed on 27 November 1937)	
Gold Medal (1st class) of the 4th Centenary of the Battle of Lepanto	
Collective Military Medal for the Foreigners Tercio	Badge of Distinction (Note: Embroidered with canutille and silk gold threads, shaped like the Individual Military Medal, on the left sleeve of the uniform. In its central part, on a red background, the emblem of the Third was represented instead of the national personification of Spain.)
Other Badges and Military Honours
Promotion Badge of Battlefield Merit or Rank Advance	Five times
Badge of the Tercio	One gold bar and four red
Sash of the Victory 1936-1939	18 July 1940
Sword of the Civil War Victory	20 May 1939
Civil Decorations
Chief and Grand Collar of the Imperial Order of the Yoke and Arrows (Note: Civil and military order)	
Chief of the Distinguished Order of Charles III	
Chief of the Order of Isabella the Catholic	
Chief of the Order of Civil Merit	
Chief and Collar of the Civil Order of Alfonso X, the Wise	
Chief of the Order of the Cross of Saint Raymond of Peñafort	
Chief of the Order of Cisneros	
Chief of the Order of Africa	
Commander by Number of the Order of Isabella the Catholic	
Sumú-u (Grand Cross) of the Order of the Mehdauia (Note: Order awarded by the Khalifa of the Spanish protectorate in Morocco.)	
Other Honours
King's Gentlemen of the Bedchamber	Alfonso XIII
Badge of the Head of the National Movement (Note: It consists of the Yoke and arrows upon three four rays stars.)	
Foreign Decorations
Collar of the Order of the Liberator General San Martín	Argentina
Collar of the Order of Bernardo O'Higgins	Chile
Grand Cross Extraordinary of the Order of Boyaca	Colombia
Grand Cross with Danica star and sash Order of the Crown of King Zvonimir	Croatia
Grand Cross with Gold Breast Star of the Order of Trujillo	Dominican Republic
Grand Cross with Gold Breast Star of the Order of Christopher Columbus	Dominican Republic
Collar of the National Order of Merit	Ecuador
Grand Cross Extraordinary of the National Order of Merit	Ecuador
Collar of the Order of the Seal of Solomon	Ethiopia
Commander of the Legion of Honour	France
Grand Cross of the Order of the German Eagle	Germany
Grand Cross of the Order of the Redeemer	Kingdom of Greece
Grand Cross of the National Order of Honour and Merit	Haiti
Knight of the Supreme Order of Christ	Holy See
Knight of the Supreme Order of the Most Holy Annunciation	Italy
Grand Cross of the Order of Saints Maurice and Lazarus	Italy
Grand Cross of the Order of the Crown of Italy	Italy
Grand Cordon of the Order of the Chrysanthemum	Japan
Grand Cordon with Brilliants of the Supreme Order of the Renaissance	Jordan
Collar of the National Order of Merit	Paraguay
Grand Cross of the Military Order of Ayacucho	Peru
Chief Commander of the Philippine Legion of Honor	Philippines
Grand Collar of the Order of Sikatuna	Philippines
Sash of the Three Orders	Portugal
Grand Collar of the Order of the Tower and Sword	Portugal
Grand Cross of the Military Order of Aviz	Portugal
Grand Commander of the Order of Rama	Thailand
International Military Orders
Bailiff Knight Grand Cross of Knight of Honour and Devotion of the Sovereign Military Order of Malta	
Knight Grand Cross of Justice with Collar of the Order of Saint Lazarus	

Coat of arms of Franco as knight of the Supreme Order of Christ (Holy See)

=== Local government ===
- Álava:
  - Vitoria:
    - Francisco de Vitoria Medal (1947) (HW)
    - Predilect Son (1936) (HW)
- Province of Albacete: Gold, Honor and Gratitude Medal of the Provincial Council (1958)
  - Albacete: Gold Medal (1945) (HW)
- Province of Alicante: Adopted and Predilect Son of the Province (HW)
  - Alicante: Gold Medal (1966) (HW)
  - Denia:
    - Gold Medal (HW)
    - Adopted Son (HW)
  - Jijona: Adopted Son (1940) (HW)
  - Ondara: Adopted Son (HW)
  - Orihuela:
    - Medal of the City
    - Covered Gentleman
  - San Juan:
    - Gold Medal (1974) (HW)
    - Adopted Son (1940) (HW)
  - Santa Pola: Adopted Son (1940) (HW)
  - Sax: Adopted Son (1940) (HW)
  - Villena: Adopted Son (1940) (HW)
- Province of Almería: Provincial Gold Medal (1956) (HW)
  - Almería: Honorary Mayor (HW)
  - Huércal-Overa: Honorary Pro-man of the Comarcal Sindical Brotherhood of Farmers and Ranchers (1946)
- Province of Ávila:
  - Ávila: Honorary Mayor (HW)
- Province of Badajoz:
  - Badajoz: Gold Medal (HW)
  - Mérida: Gold Medal (HW)
- Balearic Islands:
  - Palma de Mallorca: Gold Medal (1946) (HW)
  - Deyá: Adopted Son (1936) (HW)
  - Mahón: Gold Medal (1949) (HW)
  - Mancor del Valle: Adopted Son (1936) (HW)
  - San Lorenzo del Cardezar: Adopted Son (1937) (HW)
- Province of Barcelona:
  - Barcelona:
    - Gold Medal (HW)
    - 25 Years of Peace Local Commemorative Medal (1964) (HW)
  - Molins de Rey: Gold Medal (1973) (HW)
- Biscay:
  - Brilliants Medal of the Provincial Council (1950) (HW)
  - First Biscayan of Adoption and Honour (1950) (HW)
  - Bilbao:
    - Gold Medal (1939) (HW)
    - Honorary Mayor (1939) (HW)
  - Baracaldo: Gold Medal (1950) (HW)
  - Durango: Gold Medal (1972) (HW)
  - Guernica:
    - Brilliants Medal (1937) (HW)
    - Adopted Son (1966) (HW)
  - Orduña:
    - Brilliants Medal (1961) (HW)
    - Perpetual Honorary Mayor (1967) (HW)
  - Santurce: Gold Medal (1971) (HW)
  - Sestao:
    - Gold Medal (1966) (HW)
    - Adopted Son (1966) (HW)
- Province of Burgos:
  - Burgos:
    - Gold Medal (HW)
    - Honorary Mayor (HW)
- Province of Cáceres: Provincial Gold Medal (1954) (HW)
  - Cáceres:
    - Gold Medal (1951) (HW)
    - Freedom of the City (HW)
  - Plasencia:
    - Gold Medals (1945) (HW) (1964) (HW) (1971) (HW)
- Province of Cádiz: Gold Plate (1948) (HW)
  - Cádiz: Gold Medal (1975-2008, Posthumous)
  - Barbate: Perpetual Honorary Mayor (HW)
  - Chiclana de la Frontera:
    - Gold Medal (HW)
    - Adopted Son(HW)
  - Puerto Real:
    - Gold Medal (HW)
    - Adopted and Predilect Son (HW)
  - El Puerto de Santa María:
    - Gold Medal (1962) (HW)
    - Honorary Mayor (1964) (HW)
  - San Fernando:
    - Gold Medal (1950)
    - Perpetual Honorary Mayor (1951)
  - San Roque: Gold Medal (1950) (HW)
  - Sanlúcar de Barrameda:
    - Gold Medal (1961) (HW)
    - Perpetual Honorary Mayor (1972) (HW)
- Province of Castellón:
  - Castellón: Gold Medal (HW)
  - Burriana: Gold Medal (1968) (HW)
  - Vall de Uxó:
    - Gold Medal (HW)
    - Adopted Son (HW)
- Province of Ciudad Real:
  - Almadén: Gold Medal (1953) (HW)
  - Puertollano: Honorary Mayor (HW)
  - Socuéllamos: Perpetual Honorary Mayor (HW)
  - Tomelloso: (HW)
    - Gold Medal (1973) (HW)
    - Perpetual Honorary Mayor (1967) (HW)
- Province of Córdoba: Gold Medal of the Provincial Council (1961) (HW)
  - Baena: Gold Medal (1946) (HW)
  - Cabra: Gold Medal (1961) (HW)
- Province of La Coruña:
  - Predilect Son of the Province (1936) (HW)
  - Galician Ex-Combatant Medal (1943) (HW)
  - Honorary President of the Provincial Council (1944) (HW)
  - La Coruña:
    - Gold Medal (HW)
    - Honorary Mayor (HW)
  - Betanzos:
    - Gold Medal
    - Adopted Son
  - Ferrol:
    - Gold Medal (HW)
    - Honorary Mayor (HW)
    - Predilect Son (HW)
  - Santiago de Compostela: Gold Honor Medal (1946) (HW)
- Province of Cuenca:
  - Honorary President of the Provincial Council (HW)
  - Adopted Son of the Province (HW)
  - Cuenca:
    - Gold Medal (1951) (HW)
    - Honorary Mayor (1947) (HW)
    - Predilect Son (1941) (HW)
    - Adopted Son (1951) (HW)
- Province of Gerona:
  - Honorary President of the Provincial Council (1944) (HW)
  - Gerona: Perpetual Honorary Mayor (1964) (HW)
  - Blanes: Gold Medal (1964) (HW)
  - Figueras: Honorary Mayor (1964) (HW)
- Province of Granada: Gold Medal of the Provincial Council (1956) (HW)
  - Motril: Gold Medal (1963)
  - Baza:
    - Gold Medal (1946) (HW)
    - Adopted Son (1946) (HW)
  - Santa Fe: Adopted Son (1936) (HW)
- Province of Guadalajara: Gold Medal of the Provincial Council (1959) (HW)
  - Guadalajara: Gold Medal (1959) (HW)
- Guipúzcoa:
  - San Sebastián: Gold Medal (1939) (HW)
  - Anzuola: Honorary Mayor (HW)
  - Arechavaleta: Honorary Mayor (HW)
  - Eibar: Honorary Mayor (1949) (HW)
  - Elgoibar: Honorary Mayor (1936) (HW)
  - Elgueta: Honorary Mayor (1936) (HW)
  - Mondragón: Honorary Mayor (HW)
  - Oñate: Honorary Mayor (HW)
  - Pasajes: Honorary Mayor (1949) (HW)
  - Rentería: Honorary Mayor (HW)
  - Vergara: Honorary Mayor (HW)
  - Zarauz: Honorary Mayor (1949) (HW)
  - Zumaya: Honorary Mayor (HW)
- Province of Huelva:
  - Huelva:
    - Gold Medal (1943) (HW)
    - Honorary Mayor (1943) (HW)
    - Adopted Son (1943) (HW)
  - Aljaraque: Honorary Mayor (1966) (HW)
  - Almonte: Honorary Mayor (1956) (HW)
  - Gibraleón: Honorary Mayor (HW)
  - Nerva: Perpetual Honorary Mayor (1966) (HW)
  - San Juan del Puerto: Honorary Mayor (1956) (HW)
  - Valverde del Camino: Perpetual Honorary Mayor (1966) (HW)
  - Zalamea la Real: Perpetual Honorary Mayor (1966) (HW)
- Province of Huesca:
  - Gold Medal of the Provincial Council (1953) (HW)
  - Adopted Son of the Province (1953) (HW)
  - Huesca:
    - Perpetual Honorary Mayor (1953) (HW)
    - Adopted Son (1953) (HW)
  - Barbastro:
    - Gold Medal (1953) (HW)
    - Honorary Mayor (1953) (HW)
    - Adopted Son (1953) (HW)
  - Binéfar:
    - Gold Medal (1969) (HW)
    - Honorary Mayor (1969) (HW)
  - Monzón:
    - Perpetual Honorary Mayor (1953) (HW)
    - Adopted Son (1953) (HW)
- Province of Jaén:
  - Gold Medal of the Provincial Council (1957) (HW)
  - Honorary President of the Provincial Council (1945) (HW)
  - Adopted Son of the Province (1939) (HW)
  - Andújar:
    - Gold Medal (1952) (HW)
    - Perpetual Honorary Mayor (1960) (HW)
  - Úbeda: Gold Medal (1965) (HW)
- Province of León:
  - Extraordinary Gold Medal of the Provincial Council (1960) (HW)
  - Honorary President of the Provincial Council (1945) (HW)
  - Adopted Son of the Province (1939) (HW)
  - Provincial Combatant Medal, extraordinary category (1964) (HW)
  - León
    - City Medal with Laurels (1952) (HW)
  - Ponferrada:
    - Gold Medal (1949) (HW)
    - Honorary Mayor (1949) (HW)
  - Villablino: Gold Medal (1971) (HW)
- Province of Lérida:
  - Gold Medal of the Provincial Council (1947) (HW)
  - Honorary President of the Provincial Council (1942) (HW)
  - Lérida: Gold Medal (1941) (HW)
  - Seo de Urgel: Gold Medal (1966) (HW)
- Province of Logroño: Gold Medal of the Provincial Council (1954) (HW)
  - Logroño: Gold Medal (1936) (HW)
- Province of Lugo:
  - Gold Medal of the Provincial Council (1958) (HW)
  - Honorary President of the Provincial Council (1944) (HW)
  - Lugo:
    - Honorary Mayor (1939) (HW)
    - Perpetual Honorary Mayor (1954) (HW)
  - Mondoñedo: Gold Medal (1949) (HW)
- Province of Madrid:
  - Madrid:
    - Gold Medal (HW)
    - Honor Medal (HW)
    - Honorary Mayor (HW)
    - Adopted Son (HW)
  - Aranjuez: Gold Medal (1970) (HW)
  - Coslada: Honorary Mayor (1967) (HW)
  - Chinchón: Gold Medal (1951)
  - Getafe:
    - Gold Medal (1972) (HW)
    - Perpetual Honorary Mayor (1972) (HW)
  - Pinto: Gold with Brilliants Point (1949) (HW)
- Province of Málaga:
  - Gold Medal of the Provincial Council (1964) (HW)
  - Honorary President of the Provincial Council (1946) (HW)
  - Málaga:
    - Gold Medal (1946) (HW)
    - Honorary Mayor (1943) (HW)
    - Adopted and Predilect Son (1937) (HW)
  - Marbella: Gold Medal (1965) (HW)
  - Ronda:
    - Gold Medal (1967) (HW)
    - Adopted Son (1967) (HW)
  - Vélez-Málaga:
    - Gold Medal (1964) (HW)
    - Adopted Son (HW)
- Province of Murcia: Gold Medal of the Provincial Council (1946)
  - Murcia:
    - Gold Medal (1946) (HW)
  - Águilas: Gold Medal (1968)
  - Cartagena: Gold Medal (1945) (HW)
  - Lorca: Gold Medal (1965)
- Province of Orense: Gold Medal of the Provincial Council (1957) (HW)
  - Orense:
    - Gold Medal (1946) (HW)
    - Adopted Son (1946) (HW)
  - Carballino: Gold Medal (1961) (HW)
- Province of Oviedo:
  - Oviedo:
    - Gold Medal (1964) (HW)
    - Adopted Son (1934) (HW)
  - Castrillón:
    - Gold Medal (1968) (HW)
    - Predilect Son (1968) (HW)
  - Gijón:
    - Gold Medal (1962) (HW)
    - Adopted Son (1939) (HW)
    - Honorary Mayor (1939) (HW)
  - Llanes: Gold Medal (1967) (HW)
- Province of Palencia: Gold Medal of the Provincial Council (HW)
  - Palencia: Gold Medal (1941) (HW)
- Province of Las Palmas: Gold Medal of the Provincial Council (1952) (HW)
  - Las Palmas de Gran Canaria:
    - Gold Medal (1969) (HW)
    - Honorary Mayor (1943) (HW)
  - Gran Canaria:
    - Honorary President of the council (1945) (HW)
    - Council Medal of the Ex-Combatant (1942) (HW)
  - Fuerteventura:
    - Council Gold Medal (1960) (HW)
    - Honorary President of the council (1945) (HW)
  - Arucas: Gold Medal (1950) (HW)
  - Telde:
    - Gold Medal (1975) (HW)
    - Adopted Son (1936) (HW)
- Province of Pamplona - Former Kingdom of Navarre:
  - Extraordinary Gold Medal (1939) (HW)
  - Gold Medal of the Provincial Council (1974) (HW)
  - Adopted Son of Navarre (1974) (HW)
  - Pamplona: Adopted and Predilect Son (HW)
  - Esteribar: Adopted Son (1948) (HW)
  - Huarte-Araquil: Adopted and Predilect Son (1948) (HW)
  - Lumbier: Adopted Son (1948) (HW)
  - Marcilla: Adopted Son (1948) (HW)
  - Miranda de Arga: Adopted Son(HW)
- Province of Pontevedra: Perpetual Honorary President of the Provincial Council (1952) (HW)
  - Pontevedra: Gold Medal (1944) (HW)
  - Tuy: Gold Medal (1968) (HW)
  - Vigo: Platinum Medal (1945)
  - Villagarcía de Arosa: Gold Medal (1965) (HW)
- Province of Salamanca: Gold Medal of the Provincial Council (1954) (HW)
  - Salamanca: Gold Medal (1948) (HW)
  - Peñaranda de Bracamonte: Perpetual Honorary Mayor (1974) (HW)
- Province of Segovia: Gold Medal of the Provincial Council (1957) (HW)
  - Segovia: Gold Medal (1939) (HW)
- Province of Santa Cruz de Tenerife:
  - Santa Cruz de Tenerife:
    - Gold Medal (1939) (HW)
    - Predilect Son (1939) (HW)
  - Tenerife: Adopted Son (1936) (HW)
  - Candelaria: Adopted Son (1936) (HW)
  - San Cristóbal de La Laguna: Gold Medal (1966) (HW)
  - Hermigua:
    - Gold Medal (1946) (HW)
    - Adopted Son (1936) (HW)
  - Los Llanos de Aridane:
    - Gold Medal (1950) (HW)
    - Honorary Mayor (1950) (HW)
    - Adopted Son (1936) (HW)
  - La Orotava
    - Gold Medal (1939) (HW)
    - Predilect Son (1939) (HW)
  - El Paso:
- Province of Santander:
  - Santander:
    - Gold Medal (1952) (HW)
    - Honorary Mayor (1946) (HW)
    - Freedom of the city (1968) (HW)
  - Torrelavega:
    - Honorary Mayor (HW)
- Province of Seville:
  - Gold Medal of the Provincial Council (1967) (HW)
  - Honorary President of the Provincial Council (1946) (HW)
  - Seville:
    - Gold Medal (HW)
    - Life Honorary Mayor (HW)
  - Almadén de la Plata: Honorary Mayor (1946) (HW)
  - Bollullos de la Mitación: Adopted Son (HW)
  - Cazalla de la Sierra:
    - Adopted and Predilect Son (1951) (HW)
  - Dos Hermanas:
    - Honorary Mayor (HW)
    - Adopted Son (HW)
  - Écija: Predilect Son (1936) (HW)
  - El Madroño:
    - Honorary Mayor (1946) (HW)
    - Adopted Son (1946) (HW)
  - Mairena del Alcor: Adopted Son (1936) (HW)
  - Pedrera: Honorary Mayor (1946) (HW)
  - San Juan de Aznalfarache: Perpetual Honorary Mayor (1964) (HW)
- Province of Soria: Gold Medal of the Provincial Council (1948) (HW)
  - Soria:
    - Gold Medal (1939) (HW)
    - Honorary Mayor (1939) (HW)
  - Covaleda: Honorary Mayor (1946) (HW)
- Province of Tarragona:
  - Gold Medal of the Provincial Council (1951) (HW)
  - Perpetual Honorary Mayor of all municipalities of the Province (1964) (HW)
  - Tarragona:
    - Gold Medal (1952) (HW)
  - Amposta: Gold Medal (1963) (HW)
  - Reus:
    - Gold Medal (1943)
    - Honorary Mayor (1964)
- Province of Teruel:
  - Teruel: Perpetual Honorary Mayor (1967) (HW)
  - Alcañiz:
    - Gold Medal (1946) (HW)
    - Honorary Councilor (1946) (HW)
- Province of Toledo: Gold Medal of the Provincial Council (1972) (HW)
  - Toledo:
    - City Gold Medal (1939) (HW)
    - Alcázar Gold Medal (1961) (HW)
  - Mora: Gold Medal of the Olive Tree Party (1966) (HW)
- Province of Valencia:
  - Gold Medal of the Provincial Council (HW)
  - Honorary President of the Provincial Council (HW)
  - Valencia:
    - Gold Medal (1942) (HW)
    - Honorary Mayor (1939) (HW)
  - Algemesí:
    - Gold Medal (1946)
    - Honorary Mayor (1946)
    - Adopted and Predilect Son (1946)
  - Casinos:
    - Perpetual Honorary Mayor (1946) (HW)
    - Adopted Son (1946) (HW)
  - Catarroja: Gold Medal (1972) (HW)
  - Gandia: Predilect Son (1946) (HW)
  - Játiva:
    - Perpetual Honorary Mayor (1946) (HW)
    - Honorary and Predilect Son (1946) (HW)
  - Onteniente:
    - Perpetual Honorary Mayor (HW)
    - Adopted and Predilect Son (HW)
  - Puebla de Vallbona:
    - Perpetual Honorary Mayor (1946) (HW)
    - Predilect Son (1946) (HW)
  - Sagunto: Gold Medal (1965) (HW)
  - Sueca:
    - Perpetual Honorary Mayor (1946) (HW)
    - Honorary and Predilect Son (1946) (HW)
- Province of Valladolid: Diamonds Medal of the Provincial Council (1952) (HW)
  - Valladolid: Honorary Mayor (1939) (HW)
- Province of Zamora:
  - Zamora: Gold Medal (1949) (HW)
  - Benavente:
    - Gold Medal (1969) (HW)
    - Adopted Son (1958) (HW)
    - Honor Citizen (1936) (HW)
  - Santibáñez de Vidriales: Adopted Son (1958) (HW)
- Province of Zaragoza:
  - Zaragoza:
  - Calatayud: Gold Medal (1951) (HW)
- Ceuta:
  - Gold and Brilliants Medal
  - Perpetual Honorary Mayor (1939)
  - Predilect Son

== Private corporations ==
- Fútbol Club Barcelona:
  - Palau Blagurana Inauguration Commemorative Gold Medal (1971) (HW)
  - Club 75 Anniversary Gold Medal (1974) (HW)

== Scholastic ==
=== Honorary doctorates ===
Spain:

- Pontifical University of Salamanca, Canon Law, 1954.
- University of Santiago de Compostela, Sciences, 1965 (HW).
- University of Salamanca, Law, 1966.

Portugal:

- University of Coimbra, Law, 1949.

== Honorific eponyms ==
=== Localities ===
- Badajoz: Esparragosa del Caudillo (HEW), Gévora del Caudillo (HEW), Guadiana del Caudillo (HEW) and Villafranco del Guadiana
- Cáceres: Albalá del Caudillo (HEW), Alagón del Caudillo (HEW) and Tiétar del Caudillo (HEW)
- Ciudad Real: Llanos del Caudillo and Villanueva de Franco (HEW)
- Córdoba: Bembézar del Caudillo (HEW)
- La Coruña: Ferrol del Caudillo (HEW)
- Jaén: Guadalén del Caudillo (HEW) and Guadalimar del Caudillo (HEW)
- León: Bárcena del Caudillo (HEW)
- Málaga: Villafranco del Guadalhorce
- Salamanca: Águeda del Caudillo (HEW)
- Seville: El Viar del Caudillo (HEW) and Villafranco del Guadalquivir (HEW)
- Teruel: Campillo de Franco (HEW)
- Toledo: Alberche del Caudillo
- Zaragoza: Bardena del Caudillo (HEW)

=== Institutions and public infrastructures ===
- Alcobendas, Madrid: «Generalísimo Franco» School (HEW)
- Alhama de Murcia: «Francisco Franco» School (HEW)
- Arrecife, Las Palmas: «Generalísimo Franco» Scholar Group (HEW)
- Barcelona:
  - «Francisco Franco» Health City of Social Security (HEW)
  - Autonomous University: «Francisco Franco» School of Sanitary Technical Assistants (HEW)
- Beariz, Orense: «Francisco Franco» School (HEW)
- Benagéber, Valencia: Generalissimo Dam
- Cádiz: «Generalísimo Franco» Institution of Feminine Labor Teaching (HEW)
- La Coruña: «Generalísimo Franco» School (HEW)
- Ciudad Real: «Generalísimo Franco» School (HEW)
- Getafe, Madrid: «Francisco Franco» Public School (HEW)
- Jerez, Cádiz: «Generalísimo Franco» School (HEW)
- Madrid:
  - «Francisco Franco» City Scholars (HEW)
  - «Francisco Franco» Provincial Health City (HEW)
  - «Generalísimo Franco» Military Hospital (1950-2001)
- Málaga: «Francisco Franco» Professional School (HEW)
- Parla, Madrid: «Francisco Franco» School (HEW)
- Rosell, Castellón: «Generalísimo Franco» School (HEW)
- San Pedro del Pinatar, Murcia: «Francisco Franco» School (HEW)
- Santa Cruz de Tenerife: «Generalísimo Franco» Public School (HEW)
- Seville: «Generalísimo Franco Franco» National School (HEW)
- Numerous avenues, streets, centers, schools, institutes and squares called "Generalísimo Franco", "Francisco Franco" or "Caudillo" of various cities and towns in the country, most of them renamed since the times of the transition to democracy.

=== Foundation ===
- Francisco Franco National Foundation

=== Awards ===
- National Literature Prize «Francisco Franco» (1940-1975)
- Spanish National Research Council (Suppressed)
  - «Francisco Franco» Prizes for Spanish Literature
  - «Francisco Franco» Prize for Sciences
  - «Francisco Franco» Prize for Individual Technical Investigation
  - «Francisco Franco» Prize for Team Technical Research

=== Other ===
- EFE News Agency (Note: Controversial original meaning of the name 'EFE'.)

== See also ==
- Francisco Franco
- Francoist Spain
- Symbols of Francoism
- List of titles and honours of Juan Carlos I of Spain

== Notes ==
- (HW): Honour posthumously withdrawn
- (HEW): Honorific eponym withdrawn

== Bibliography ==
- "Biografía del general de división, el de brigada D. Francisco Franco Bahamonde y el general de brigada, el coronel de infantería D. Rogelio Caridad Pita" [Biography of the Major General, Brigadier D. Francisco Franco Bahamonde and Brigadier General, Infantry Colonel D. Rogelio Caridad Pita] (PDF). BOE - Spanish Official Journal, No. 88 (in Spanish). Gaceta de Madrid. War Ministry. 29 March 1934.
- "Biografía cronológica de Francisco Franco" [Chronological biography of Francisco Franco] (in Spanish). Francisco Franco National Foundation.
- José Luis, Hernández Garvi (2013). Breve historia de... Francisco Franco [Brief history of ... Francisco Franco] (in Spanish). Nowtilus. ISBN 9788499675411.
- "Las sorprendentes y curiosas expresiones y sobrenombres de Franco" [The surprising and curious expressions and nicknames of Franco]. www.curistoria.com (in Spanish). Curistoria. 31 October 2018.
- Matilde Eiroa San Francisco, Matilde Acción exterior y propaganda. Las visitas de líderes latinoamericanos a Franco [Foreign action and propaganda. The visits of Latin American leaders to Franco]. Mexico. Revista de estudios Latinoamericanos [On-line]. No.54 (Jan./Jun. 2012). ISSN 2448-6914 (in Spanish).
- Moradiellos, Enrique (2016). "Franco, el caudillo: origen y perfil de una magistratura política carismática" [Franco, the caudillo: origin and profile of a charismatic political magistracy]. Historia y Política: Ideas, Procesos y Movimientos Sociales (in Spanish) (35). Universidad de Extremadura: 261–287. doi:10.18042/hp.35.11. hdl:10662/40915.
- Prieto Barrio (2011). Cruces del Mérito Militar, Naval, War Cross (Spain), Collective Military Medal and African campaigns. Condecoraciones Militares. Retrieved 2 October 2020 (in Spanish).
