= Allotriges =

The Iberian Peninsula in the 3rd century BC.

The Allotriges or Allotrigones (Greek: Allotrigoi), were a small 'Celticized' mountain people mentioned alongside the Plentauri by Strabo, as inhabitants of the region roughly corresponding to present-day northwestern La Rioja, around the area of the Ebro sources.

== Origins ==
As their name suggests, the Allotriges were initially a Celtic tribe possibly related to the Autrigones that arrived to this region in the wake of the Gallic-Belgae migrations of the 4th century BC, settling themselves in the mountains north of the Arlanzón river.

== Culture ==
The archeological record of the Allotriges remains somewhat scarce to this day, though some evidence points that they were influenced by the early Iron Age 'Bernorio-Miraveche' cultural group of northern Burgos and Palencia provinces, and later by the Celtiberians via their southern neighbours, the Turmodigi. Their linguistic affiliation has not been fully determined but it is likely that they spoke a 'Q-Celtic' language.

== History ==
Although the details of their history in the region are lacking, it seems that throughout the 3rd-1st Centuries BC the Allotriges successfully resisted the attempts made by the Cantabri, Autrigones and Turmodigi to bring them into their tribal confederacies. Thus they managed to retain their tribal identity until the late 1st Century BC, when the mounting pressure of the Cantabrian raids finally made them to seek an alliance with Rome.

== See also ==
- Cantabrian Wars
- Pre-Roman peoples of the Iberian Peninsula
