= Acontia (town) =

Town in pre-Roman Spain

Acontia (Ancient Greek: Ἀκοντία) or Acutia (Ἀκούτεια) was a town of the Vaccaei, in Hispania Tarraconensis, on the river Durius (the modern Douro), which had a ford here. Its site is unknown.
