= Pintia =

Ancient city in Peñafiel, Spain

Coordinates: 41.6178°N 4.1700°W

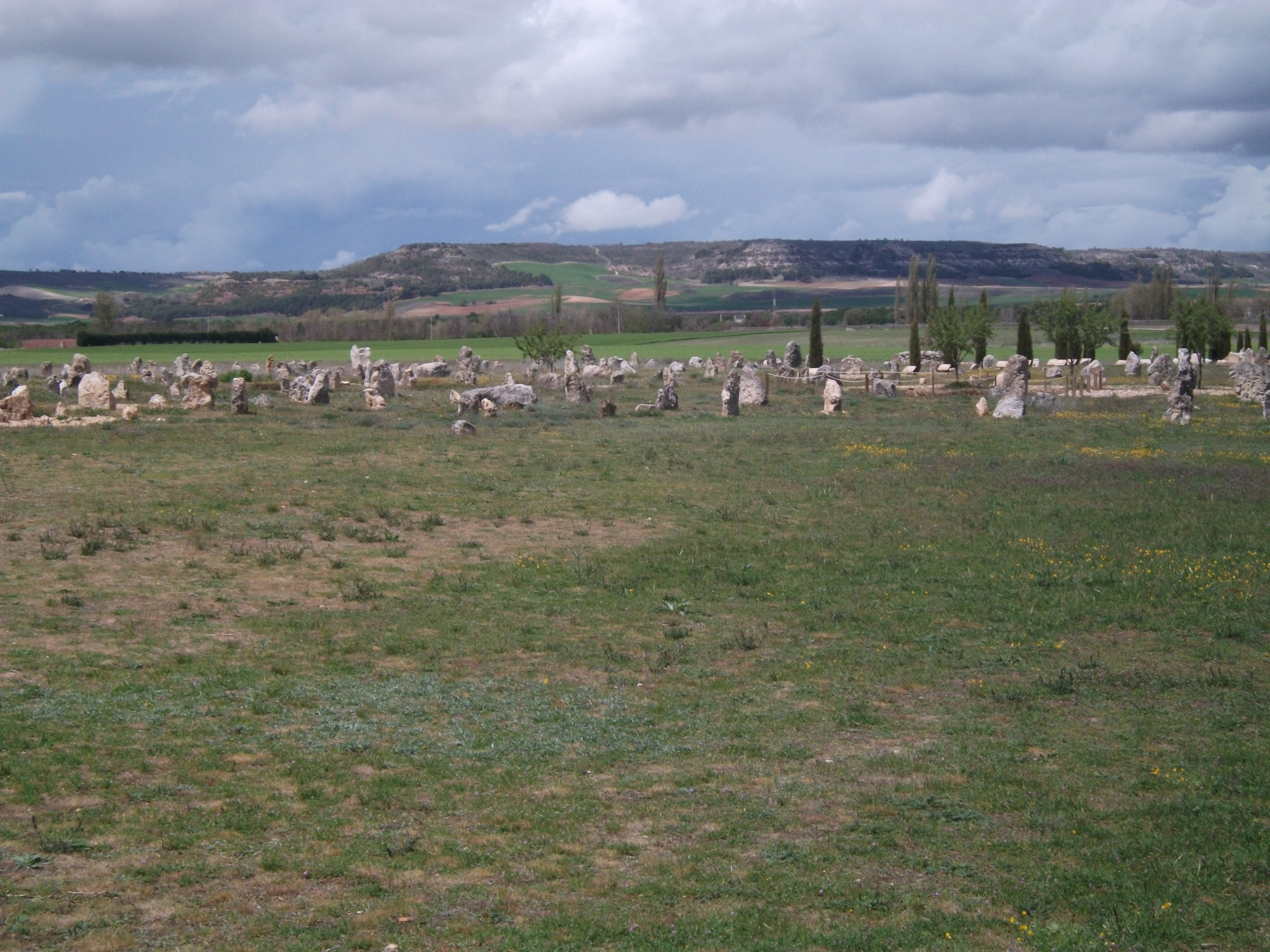
Necropolis of Las Ruedas

Pintia is the name of an ancient city of the Vaccaei, situated in the area around Padilla de Duero, in the modern province of Valladolid, central Spain.

The Vaccaei or Vacceans were the first sedentary occupants of the valley between the Duero and Pisuerga rivers, in an area that would include the modern province of Valladolid, a good part of the province of the Palencia, and sections of the Zamora, Segovia, and Ávila provinces.

The Vacceans were an early Celtic society in northern Europe that arrived in this area during a period of growth. They founded various cities (Pallantia, Pintia) that had almost independent governments as city-states but maintained relations with their sister sisters in the surrounding area. Such was the sisterhood of these cities that the Vacceans helped the Arevaci of Numancia during the Roman siege. Because of their assistance to the Arevaci, the Roman invaders conquered the Vaccean cities after they had been victorious at Numancia.

Pintia was besieged and destroyed by the Romans, which also buried forever the Vaccean culture, religion, and language.

Years ago, it was believed that Valladolid was the ancient Pintia, but neither the location nor the archaeology supported this belief. The archaeological excavations conducted in Padilla de Duero uncovered an important settlement that has been interpreted as its possible location.

The Archaeological Zone consists of three different parts: the city of Las Quintanas, the necropolis of Las Ruedas, and the potter's district of Carralaceña. In the city of Las Quintanas they have discovered that the city was destroyed by a fire, after which the Visigoths of the area placed their necropolis near the ancient Vacceo-Roman city. In the necropolis of Las Ruedas they have encountered rich burials of elderly soldiers. In the nearby town of Pesquera de Duero they have found the artisan district of Carralaceña, and since the kilns had such a large output, there could have been fires in the city during the period the kilns were used, so they constructed the kilns on the other side of the river and therefore established a contiguous district with the cemetery on that side of the river Duero. The kilns found here are unique in Europe, but they cannot be visited because the Executive of Castile and León do not think it would be profitable to set up the site for tourism.

The town was partially destroyed by the planting of vineyards because of the lack of support given to the excavation projects. The University of Valladolid is currently in charge of the recovery and study of the town.

The necropolis at Pintia is currently being excavated by international field school students every summer under the supervision of the University of Valladolid and the Federico Wattenberg Center of Vaccean Studies, facilitated by ArchaeoSpain.
