= Plentauri =

The Iberian Peninsula in the 3rd century BC.

The Plentauri or Pleutauri (Greek: Pleutauroi) was a small, pre-Roman mountain people of the Iberian Peninsula mentioned briefly by Strabo who placed them in the Ebro sources area close to the Cantabrian range, roughly corresponding today to northwestern La Rioja.

== Origins ==
Their ethnic and linguistical affiliation however, remains obscure though they certainly had Indo-European origins and even their tribal name might bear some connection with the neighbouring Cantabrian tribe of the Plentuisii.

== Culture and History ==
Although they apparently left little archeological trace of their own and details of their history in the region are sketchy at best, it seems that like their neighbours the Allotriges, the Plentauri clung to their mountain strongholds resisting Cantabri and Autrigones' attempts to incorporate them into their respective tribal federations. This state of affairs lasted until the late 1st Century BC, when the continuous pressure of Cantabrian raids finally brought to bear and this certainly forced the Plentauri to request Roman protection.

== See also ==
- Cantabrian Wars
- Pre-Roman peoples of the Iberian Peninsula
