= National Order of Honour and Merit =

National Order of Haiti

National Order of Honour and Merit Ordre National Honneur et Mérite
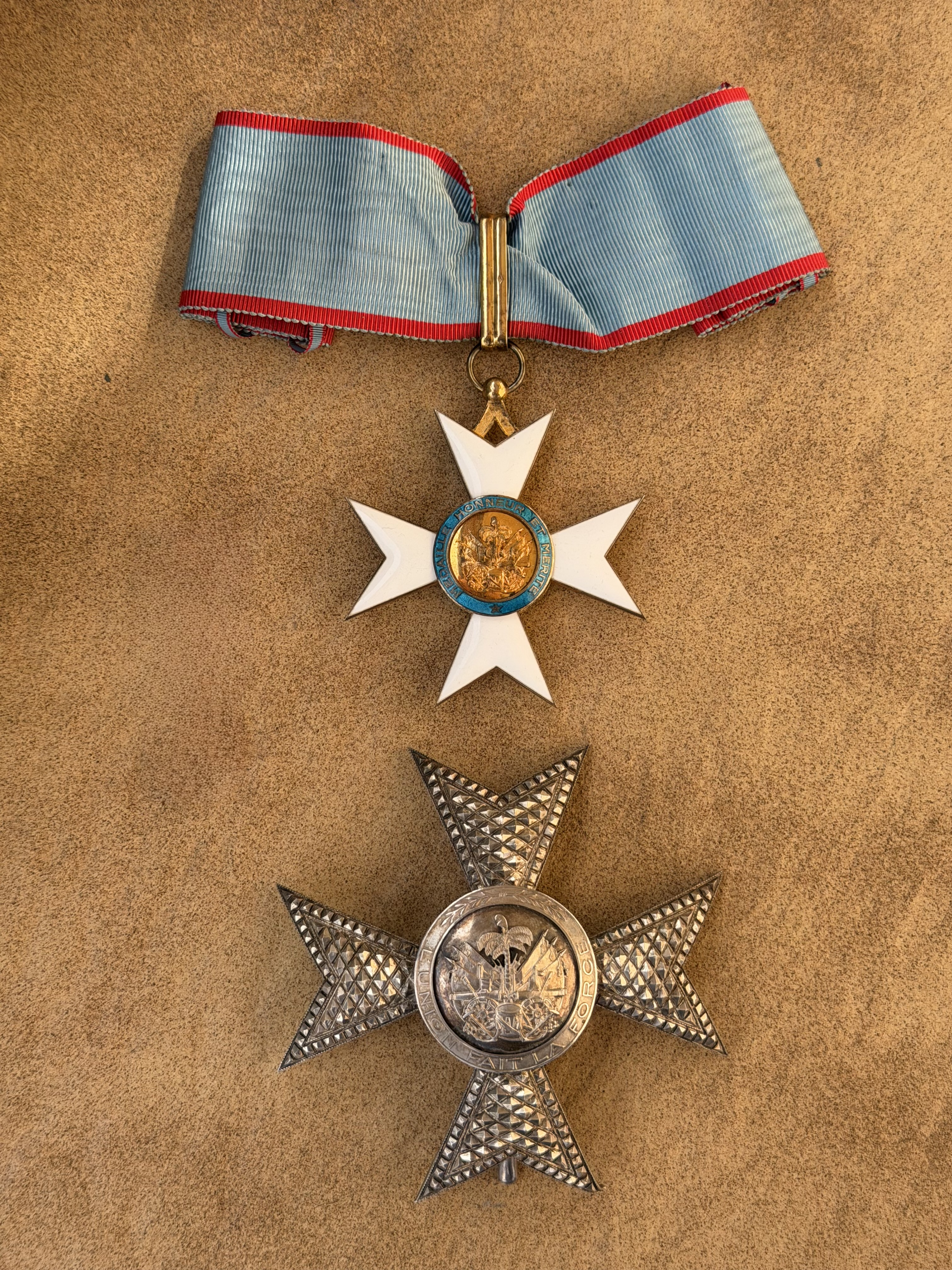
- Grand Officer insignia of the Order

Awarded by Haiti
- Type: National order
- Status: Currently constituted
- Grades: Grand Cross; Grand Officer; Commander; Officer; Knight
- Ribbon of the order

The National Order of Honour and Merit (French: Ordre National Honneur et Mérite) is the highest honour of merit awarded by the President of the Republic of Haiti. The Order was instituted on 28 May 1926 and is awarded in five grades to both Haitians and foreign nationals. The award is given to acknowledge distinction in not only the realms of diplomacy and politics but also the arts, charitable works and other fields of benefit or interest to Haiti.

== Award ==
The award is a white enamel Maltese cross with laterally-pierced ball suspension. The face has a circular central medallion bearing the arms of Haiti within a blue enamel ring inscribed with the words, ‘Medaille Honneur et Merite’. The reverse with a circular central medallion is inscribed with ‘République D'Haïti’ within a blue enamel ring inscribed in gilt letters ‘Liberte Egalite Fraternite’.

== Grades ==
Ribbons of the Order for Honour and Merit
Grand Cross	Grand Officer	Commander	Officer	Knight

== Recipients ==
- United States J. Hunter Guthrie
- Grand Crosses;
  - Republic of China Tsai Ing-wen
  - Spanish State Francisco Franco
  - Canada Mauril Bélanger
  - United States Kenneth H. Merten
  - United States Smedley Butler
  - United States Sean Penn
  - Argentina Eva Perón
- Grand Officers;
  - Haiti Wyclef Jean
- Commanders;
  - United States Ben Moreell
- Knights;
  - Haiti Issa El-Saieh (March 13, 1959)
