= The Most Excellent =

Honorific prefix

The Most Excellent (Spanish: Excelentísimo Señor (male) or Excelentísima Señora (female), literally "Most Excellent Lord/Lady") – abbreviated "Excmo. Sr. D." (male); or "Excma. Sra. D.ª" / "Excma. Sra. Dña." (female) – is an honorific prefix that is traditionally applied to certain people in Spain and certain Spanish-speaking countries. Following Spanish tradition, it is an ex officio style (the holder has it as long as they remain in office, in the most important positions of state) and is used in written documents and very formal occasions.

The prefix is similar (but not equal) to that of "His/Her Excellency", but in the 19th century "The Most Excellent" began to replace the former.

The use of the prefix Excellency was re-introduced in Francoist Spain by Generalísimo Francisco Franco himself, who was formally styled as Su Excelencia el Jefe del Estado ("His Excellency the Head of State"), while his ministers and senior government officials continued using the prefix "The Most Excellent".

The prefix "The Most Illustrious" (Ilustrísimo/a Señor/a) is the lower version, and is mostly used for non-Grandee titled nobles in Spain and some other officeholders.

== In the Kingdom of Spain ==
The following State and Government officials receive the style "The Most Excellent":

=== Household of His Majesty The King ===
- The Head of the Household
- The Secretary General
- The Head of the Military Chamber

=== Executive power ===
Central government

- The President of the Government (Prime Minister) and former Presidents of the Government
- Vice Presidents of the Government and former vice presidents
- Government Ministers and former ministers
- Secretaries of State
- The Undersecretary of the Ministry of Foreign Affairs
- Government's Delegates to the Autonomous Communities

Autonomous communities

- The Presidents of the Autonomous communities of Spain
- Counselors (ministers) of the Autonomous Communities

=== Legislative power ===
- The President of the Congress of Deputies
- The President of the Senate
- Members of the Bureau of the Congress of deputies
- Members of the Bureau of the Senate
- Members of the Bureaus of the Autonomic Legislatures

=== Constitutional Court and judiciary ===
- Justices of the Constitutional Court
- Members of the General Council of the Judiciary
- Justices of the Supreme Court
- The Attorney General of the State
- The Head prosecutor of the Supreme Court
- The Chief justice and the Head prosecutor of the Audiencia Nacional
- Chief justices and Head prosecutors of the High Courts of Justice of the Autonomous Communities

=== Local authorities ===
- The Mayors of Madrid and Barcelona
- Mayors of cities considered big cities according to the law

=== Other institutions ===
- Members of the Council of State
- Members of the Court of Audit
- Members of the Instituto de España
- Academics of the eight Royal Academies
- Members of the Nuclear Security Council
- Deans of the College of Lawyers of the provinces where a High Court of Justice is seated
- The Governor of the Bank of Spain

=== Diplomacy ===
- Ambassadors
- Diplomats with the rank of Minister-Counselor

=== Military ===
- Flag officers of the Spanish Armed Forces and the Civil Guard

=== Recipients of civilian decorations, awards and orders ===
- Knights/Dames of the Collar and Knights/Dames Grand Cross of any of the military and civilian orders
- Holders of the Gold Medal of Merit in Labour

=== Nobility ===
- Grandees of Spain and their consorts
- Heirs of Grandees of Spain and their consorts

=== Other ===
- Foreign Heads of State not belonging to royalty (and their consorts) receive the style of His Excellency, while high-ranking officials of state receive the style of "The Most Excellent".

=== The Style of "His Excellency" in Spain ===
The style "His Excellency", which has a higher connotation than "The Most Excellent", is instead reserved for the children of an Infante or Infanta, who have the rank (but not the title) of Grandees.

During Francoist Spain, General Francisco Franco was the de facto Dictator of Spain and properly adopted the style His Excellency, since he was both Chief of State and Government, without being a "royal".

== Other countries ==
=== Hispanic countries ===
Following the tradition from Spain, Hispanic countries adopted the styles "His Excellency" and "The Most Excellent" although they are informally used most of the time without following rules of style.

Properly used, the style "His Excellency" (or simply "Excellency") is reserved for Chiefs of State and/or Government in Republics, i.e. the President and Vice-President of the Republic. Also, though informally, this style applies for the "President of Congress" (or equivalent) and the "President of the Supreme Courts" (or equivalent). Former Presidents and Vice-Presidents of Republics usually retain the style "His/Her Excellency" after finishing their terms, as an honorific.

The style "The Most Excellent" (Excelentísimo Señor/a) applies to high-ranking officials of Republican countries that are not Chiefs of State or Government, i.e. a Minister, a Governor, an elected official.

Ambassadors of Foreign Countries also receive the style "The Most Excellent", although informally they are addressed as "Excellency".

=== Other countries ===
In other countries, "His Excellency" and "The Most Excellent" are rarely used. San Marino’s Captain Regents are styled as "The Most Excellent".

In the United States, albeit rarely, the President of the United States is styled "Excellency". The more British-style "The Honorable" is preferred for Senators, Representatives and other elected officials.

In European monarchies or former monarchies, the style "His Excellency" is rarely used. "The Most Excellent" is sometimes given to members of the minor nobility, i.e. Viscounts and/or Barons.

In Brazil, "Excelentíssimo" (The Most Excellent) is a formal superlative form of address used to address authorities of the highest rank, such as the President of the Republic, the President of Congress, and the President of the Supreme Court.

== See also ==
- The Most Illustrious
