= Sasamón =

Coordinates: 42°25′N 4°02′W

- Municipality and town
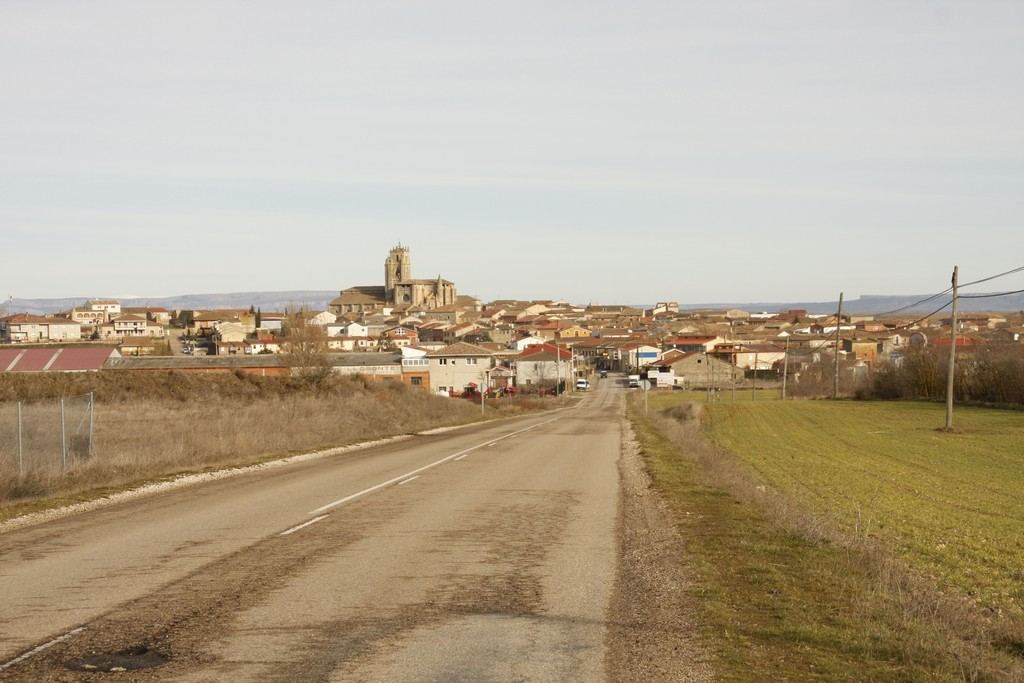
- View of Sasamón, 2010

- Coat of arms
- Interactive map of Sasamón
- Country: Spain
- Autonomous community: Castile and León
- Province: Burgos
- Comarca: Odra-Pisuerga

Area
  - Total: 113.11 km^{2} (43.67 sq mi)
- Elevation: 828 m (2,717 ft)

Population (2025-01-01)
  - Total: 898
  - Density: 7.94/km^{2} (20.6/sq mi)
- Time zone: UTC+1 (CET)
  - Summer (DST): UTC+2 (CEST)
- Postal code: 09123
- Website: http://sasamon.burgos.es/

Sasamón is a municipality and town located in the province of Burgos, Castile and León, Spain. According to the 2004 census (INE), the municipality has a population of 1,346 inhabitants.

During pre-Roman times, it was the capital of the Turmodigi tribe, under the name Segisama. During the reign of first Roman emperor Augustus, the town was the headquarters of the Roman legions that fought during the Cantabrian wars.

== Demography ==
The evolution of its population has been negative over the last twenty years.

- 1987: 1.790 inhabitants
- 1991: 1.786 inhabitants
- 1995: 1.514 inhabitants
- 1999: 1.543 inhabitants
- 2003: 1.464 inhabitants
- 2005: 1.315 inhabitants
- 2006: 1.296 inhabitants
- 2022: 957 inhabitants

== Civil Architecture ==
Medieval Bridges

There are two medieval bridges over the Brullés river.
