= Varsity letter =

Award in American schools

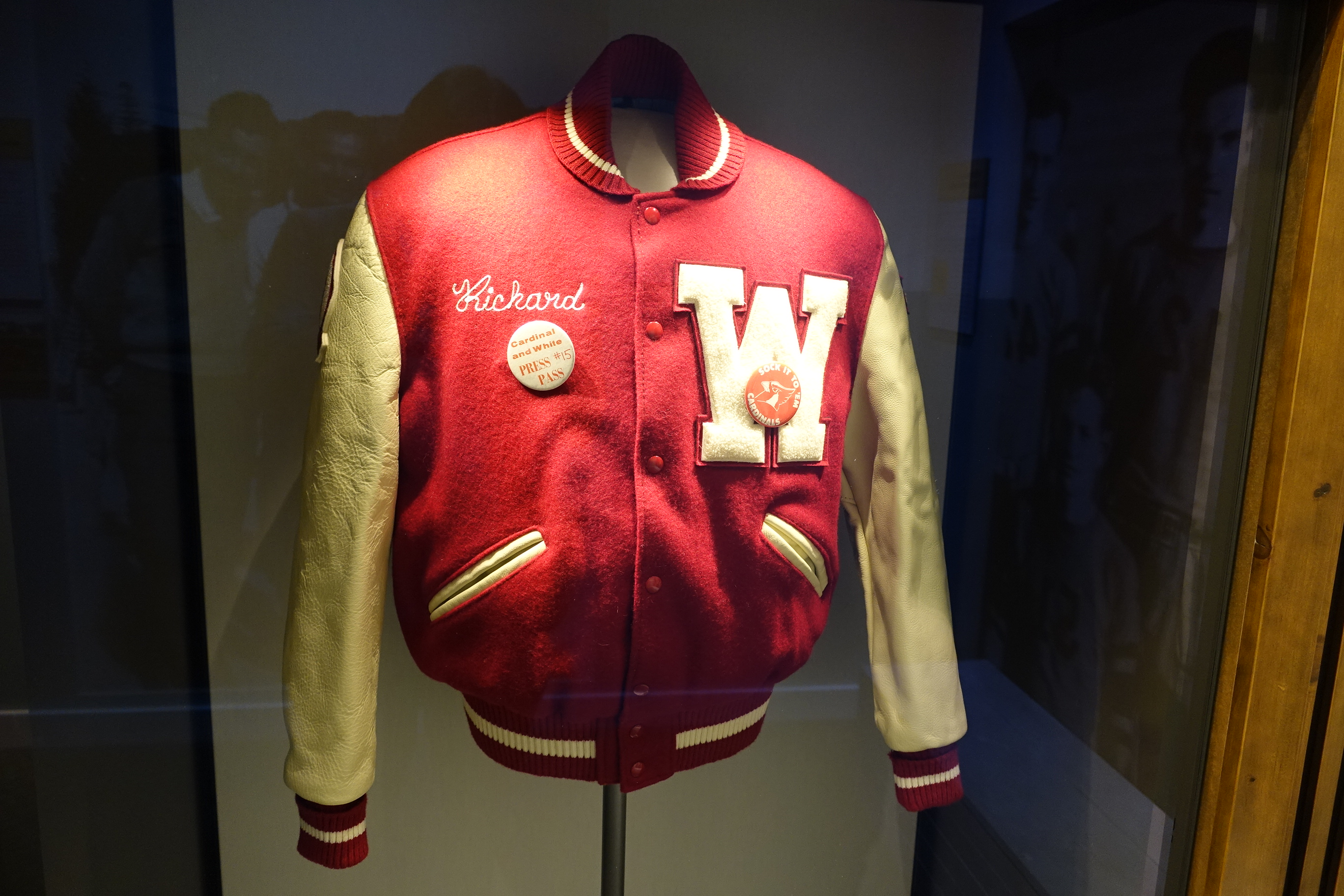
The high school varsity letter (W) awarded to Richard Nixon at Whittier High School in California, displayed on a letterman jacket

A varsity letter (or monogram) is an award earned in the United States for excellence in school activities. A varsity letter signifies that its recipient was a qualified varsity team member, awarded after a certain standard was met. A person who receives a varsity letter is known as a letterman.

== Description ==
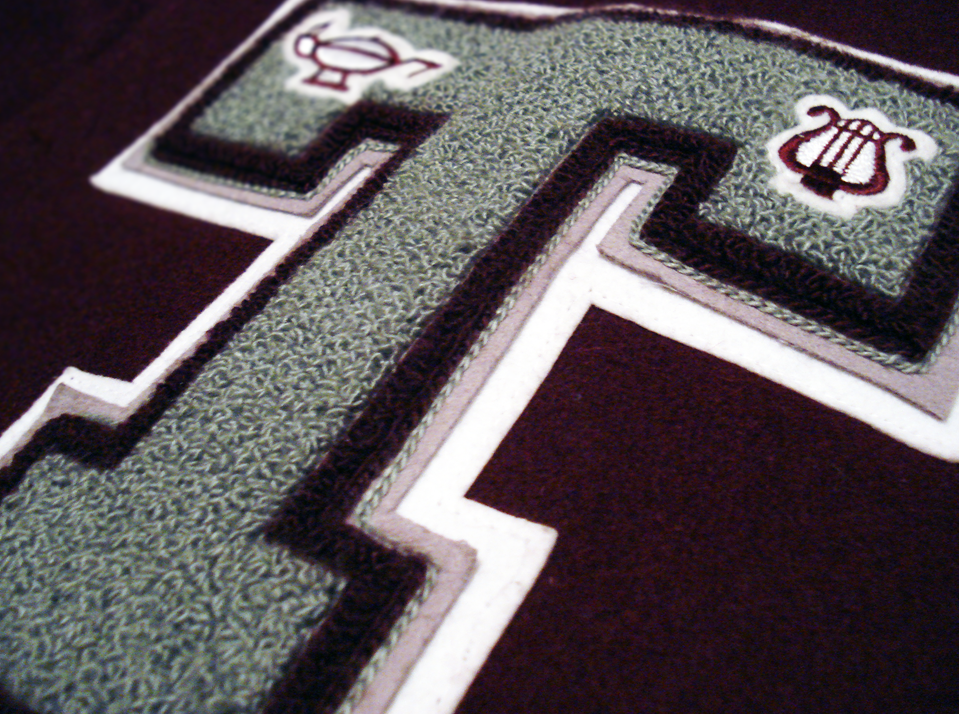
Varsity letter awarded in the Arts (Lyre) and Academia (Lamp)

The award letter is usually made in the colors and initials representing the school that the recipient attends. The letter patch is primarily constructed of chenille and felt materials. Standard sizes range from four to eight inches (100 to 200 millimeters). While four and five inches (100 and 125 mm) usually denote Junior Varsity achievements, six to eight inches (150–200 mm) would denote full (Senior) Varsity. The stitching style used for creating the chenille look is called a moss stitch, while the outlining sew down is called a chain stitch.

== Origins ==
With the advent of organized sports, there was a need for uniforms. There was an additional need for identifications which was satisfied by the use of emblems or letters.

In 1865, the Harvard baseball team added an Old English 'H'. The 'H' was embroidered on the gray flannel shirt. The football team started to use the 'H' in 1875. For 25 years following the introduction in 1865 of the letter, it was the practice for the team captain to allow certain players who played in the most important games (Yale or Princeton) to keep the 'H' jerseys as an award. If a player did not play in an important game, the player had to return the jersey at the end of the season. Awarding the 'H' jersey may have been the birth of the varsity letter as an award. The letterman sweater was first regularly used by the 1891 "Nine" (baseball) and was black with a small Crimson 'H' on the left breast.

== Usage ==
It is not known when the letter sweater came to high schools. The earliest known example of a letter sweater in a high school is found in the 1911 yearbook of Phoenix Union High School, Arizona Territory. A student in a group photo is pictured, not in a football uniform, wearing a V-neck sweater with the letter 'P' on the left side.

The sweater seems to be the home of the award letter from the 1890s until the 1930s. Another award during the 1920s and 1930s was a stadium-style blanket given as an award. In the 1930s, the letter award started to appear on leather-sleeved, wool-bodied jackets. The jackets from the 1930s were different in design from today's modern jacket.

== Variations and application ==
As a decorative clothing item, the varsity letter has a huge number of variations and no set standard is made to any school on how it should look.

Chenille letters come in many different forms and shapes. Some institutions use Old English or script style, two or three-letter monogram, 3D shading, chenille bordered or the traditional straight block style. Students generally receive only one actual letter but can win the distinction multiple times. These additional designations are shown by adding embroidered sport insignias, modeled metal insert pins, or bars that are attached to the letter. Some schools may embroider non-athletic letters with their award title, such as "Academics" or "Arts".

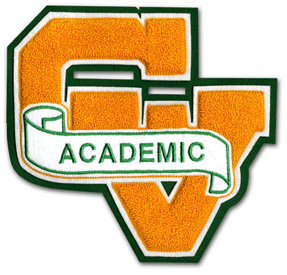
Two-letter monogram with embroidered academic insert

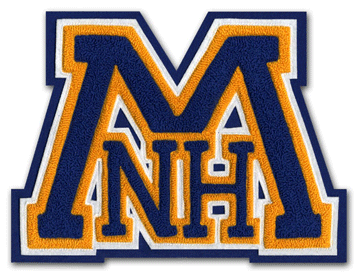
Three-letter monogram

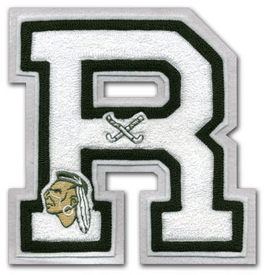
Chenille bordered letter with embroidered mascot and sport inserts

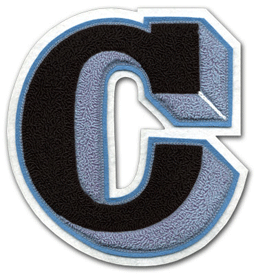
Letter with 3D shading

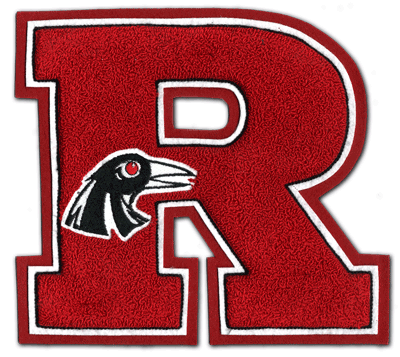
Traditional block letter with embroidered mascot

The chenille letter is traditionally placed on the left chest of the varsity jacket, which is also at times adorned with championship chenille patches showcasing the team or individual accomplishments. School mascot patches are also commonly used.

During the 1980s, and again in the 2010s, varsity jackets have been adopted into hip-hop fashion, with companies such as Avirex, Phat Farm and Rocawear making their own variations.

== See also ==
- Sporting colours
- Victor (symbol) – Symbol celebrating a doctorate in Spanish and Hispanic universities
