= Turmodigi =

The Iberian Peninsula in the 3rd century BC

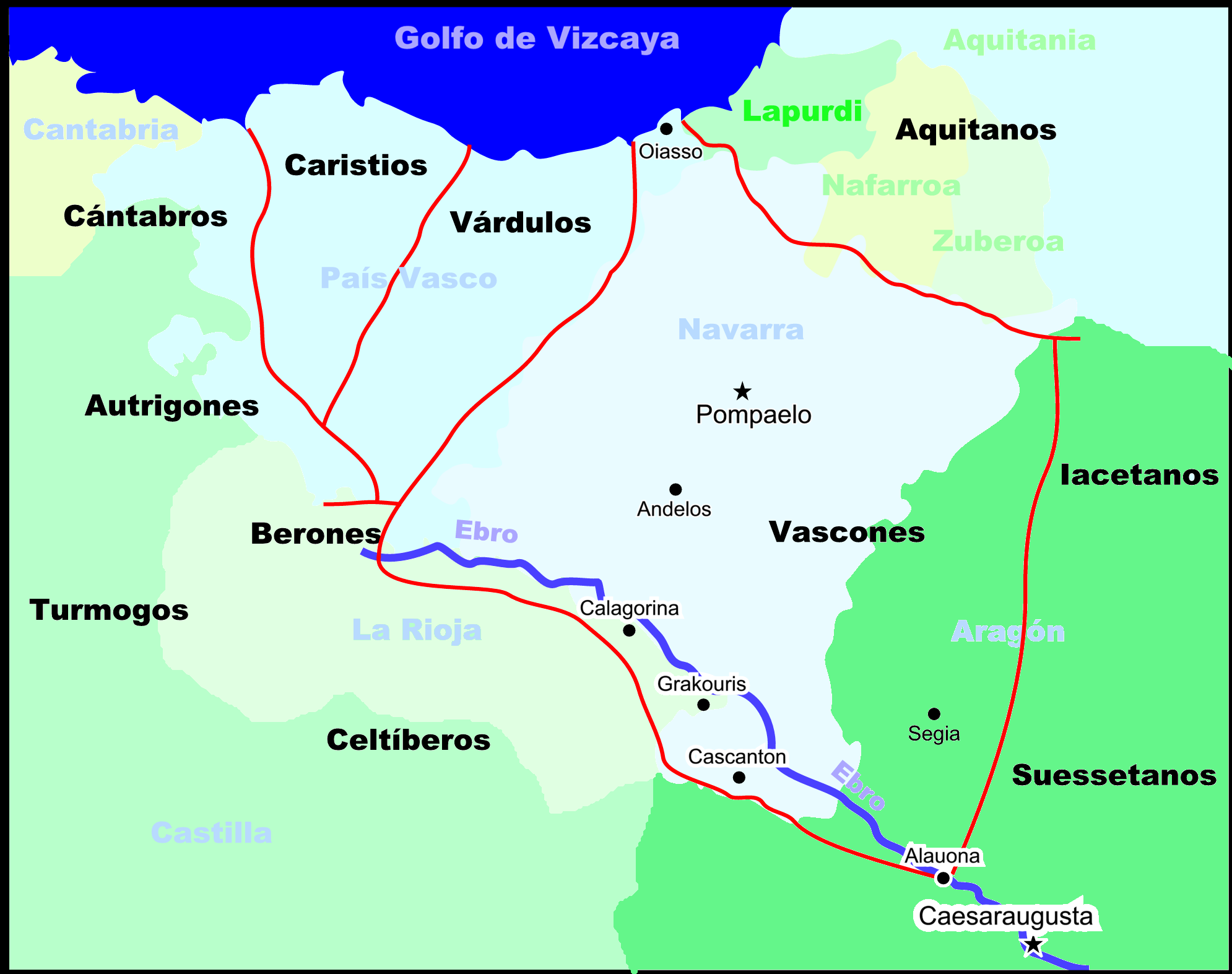
The Turmodigi territory and their neighbors

The Turmodigi were a pre-Roman ancient Celtic people of northern Spain who occupied the area within the Arlanzón and Arlanza river valleys in the 2nd Iron Age.

== Origins ==
The ancestors of the Turmodigi arrived at the Iberian Peninsula in the wake of the earlier Autrigones-Belgae migration at the 4th century BC, which settled in the area between the Arlanzón and Arlanza rivers. The neighbouring tribes surrounding the Turmodigi are mentioned by classic sources as being Celtic, as attested by the personal name 'Tormogus' in some local epigraphic sources. Designated Turmodigi by the Roman geographer Pliny the Elder, they are also mentioned in other Roman texts under the names Turmogi or Curgoni, and in the Greek ones as Murbogoioi or Mourbogoi (Ancient Greek: Μούρβογοι).

== Culture ==
Archeology has related them with the early Iron Age "Bernorio-Miraveche" cultural group of northern Burgos and Palencia provinces. Moreover, recent studies carried out at their most famed cemetery of Miraveche and as well as other 2nd Iron Age sites in the region indicates that their culture was heavily celtiberianized, demonstrating also strong affinities with the ‘Duero Culture’ of the Vaccei.

In the 2nd century BC they established a state with Segisama, also named Segisamone or Segisamum (Sasamón – Burgos; Celtiberian mint: Sekisamos) as its capital, along with the towns of Deobrigula/Teobrigula (Tardajos – Burgos), Ambisna (Pampliega?– Burgos), Bravum/Bravon (Huermeces, Ubierna or La Nuez de Abajo, in the Santibañez valley – Burgos), Mancellus (near Lerma, in the Arlanza river valley) and Sisaraca/Pisoraca (Herrera de Pisuerga – Palencia). The attribution of Pisoraca to the Turmodigi is under discussion, being attributed to the Cantabri peoples in the latest studies.

== History ==
Initially a client tribe of the Autrigones, the Turmodigi threw off their yoke with the help of the Vaccei around the early 3rd century BC, seizing most of the former's lands corresponding today to the central and western Burgos province and the eastern Palencia province. Like their Autrigones and Vaccei neighbours, the Turmodigi retained a separated identity until the later 1st century BC, when they were first conquered and included in Hispania Citerior by Pompey and Quintus Caecilius Metellus Pius in 73 BC. However, the Turmodigi were not subdued until 56 BC, after a joint uprising with the Vaccei and other peoples was defeated by the Proconsul of Citerior Quintus Caecilius Metellus Nepos Iunior.

Subjected to Cantabri and Astures raids, they allied themselves with Rome during the Astur-Cantabrian wars in the late 1st century BC, even allowing Emperor Augustus to establish its own headquarters at their capital Segisama, thus turning Turmodigia into a rear base for the conquest of both Asturias and Cantabria. In the midst of Augustus' administrative reform in 27 BC, the Turmodigi were incorporated into the Conventus Cluniensis, part of the new Hispania Tarraconensis province.

== See also ==
- Cantabrian Wars
- Sertorian Wars
- Pre-Roman peoples of the Iberian Peninsula
