= Victor (symbol) =

Symbol celebrating a doctorate in Spanish and Hispanic universities

An example of the victor symbol.

The victor symbol (Spanish: víctor or vítor) is an emblem that is painted on the walls of some Spanish and Latin American universities to commemorate students who have received the degree of doctorate, but the ligature can't be decomposable. The custom dates back to the 14th century, and the symbol has historically been used at older universities in the Spanish-speaking world, such as the University of Salamanca, the University of Alcalá, and the University of Seville in Spain, as well as the National University of San Marcos in Lima, Peru. According to the custom, when a student receives the doctorate, the victor symbol is painted on the walls of the university in red or black paint along with the student's name.

At the end of the Spanish Civil War, the victor sign was appropriated by the nationalists as a symbol of their victory in the war, and it came to be used as a personal emblem for the dictator Francisco Franco. Despite its former use by Franco, it is still used in its original sense at several universities.

The victor symbol takes the shape of the letters V, I, C, T, O, and R arranged in a monogram that varies from symbol to symbol. In some cases, the letter C is omitted. Usually, the name of the student is painted alongside the symbol. The symbol is sometimes used to commemorate a notable person that visited the university or has some special connection with the university.

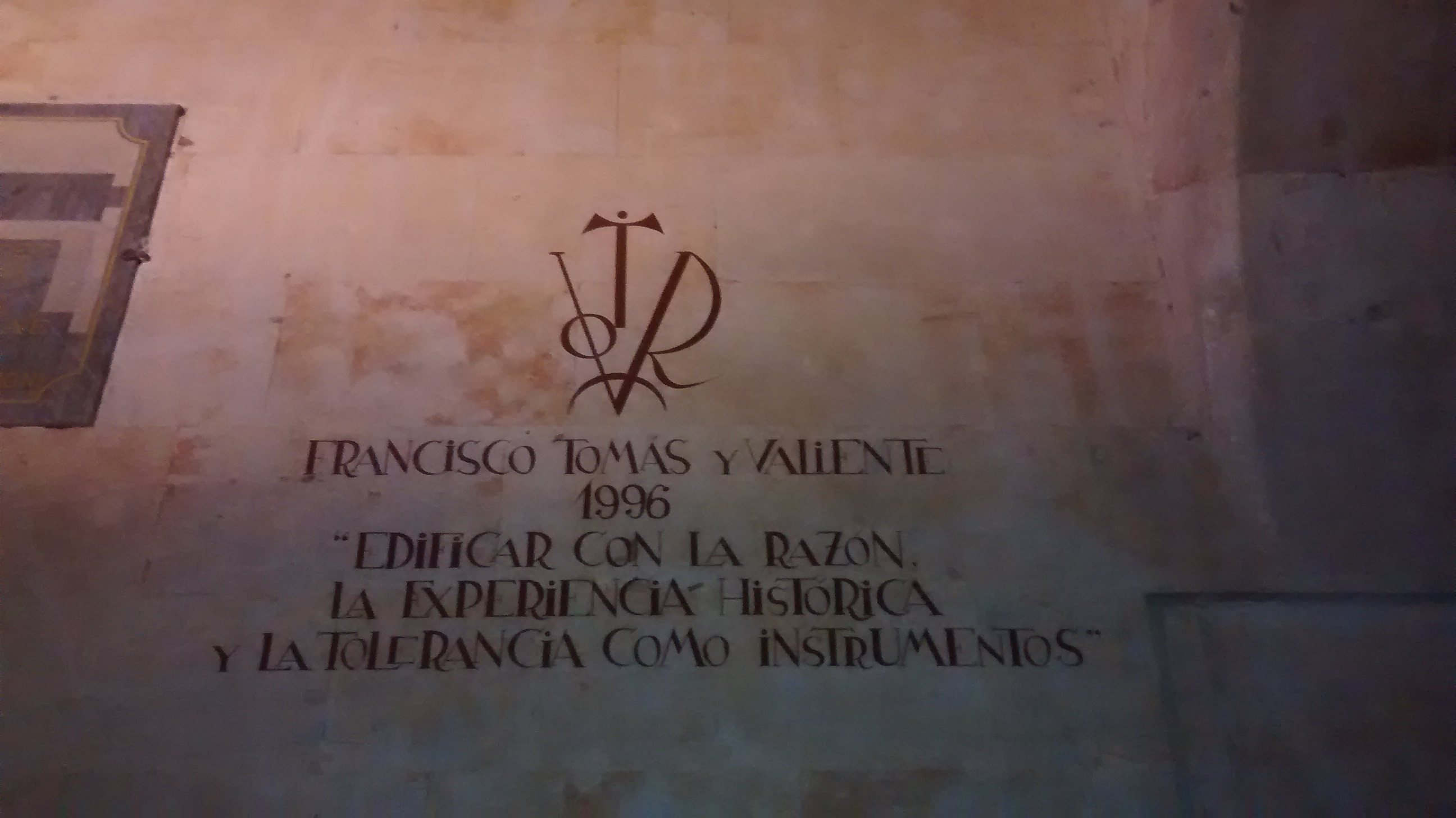
The victor emblem of jurist and historian Francisco Tomás y Valiente painted on the wall of the University of Salamanca, who received his doctorate (honoris causa) in 1996.

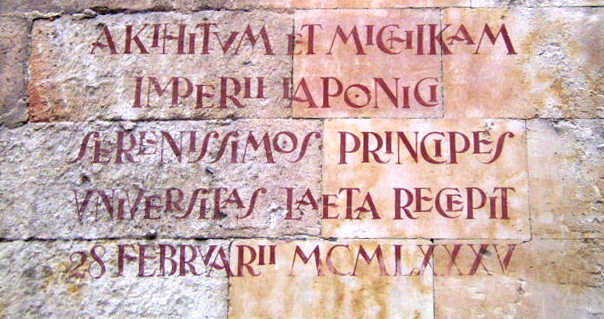
Text in Latin accompanying a victor symbol to commemorate the visit of Emperor Akihito and Empress Michiko of Japan to the University of Salamanca in 1985.

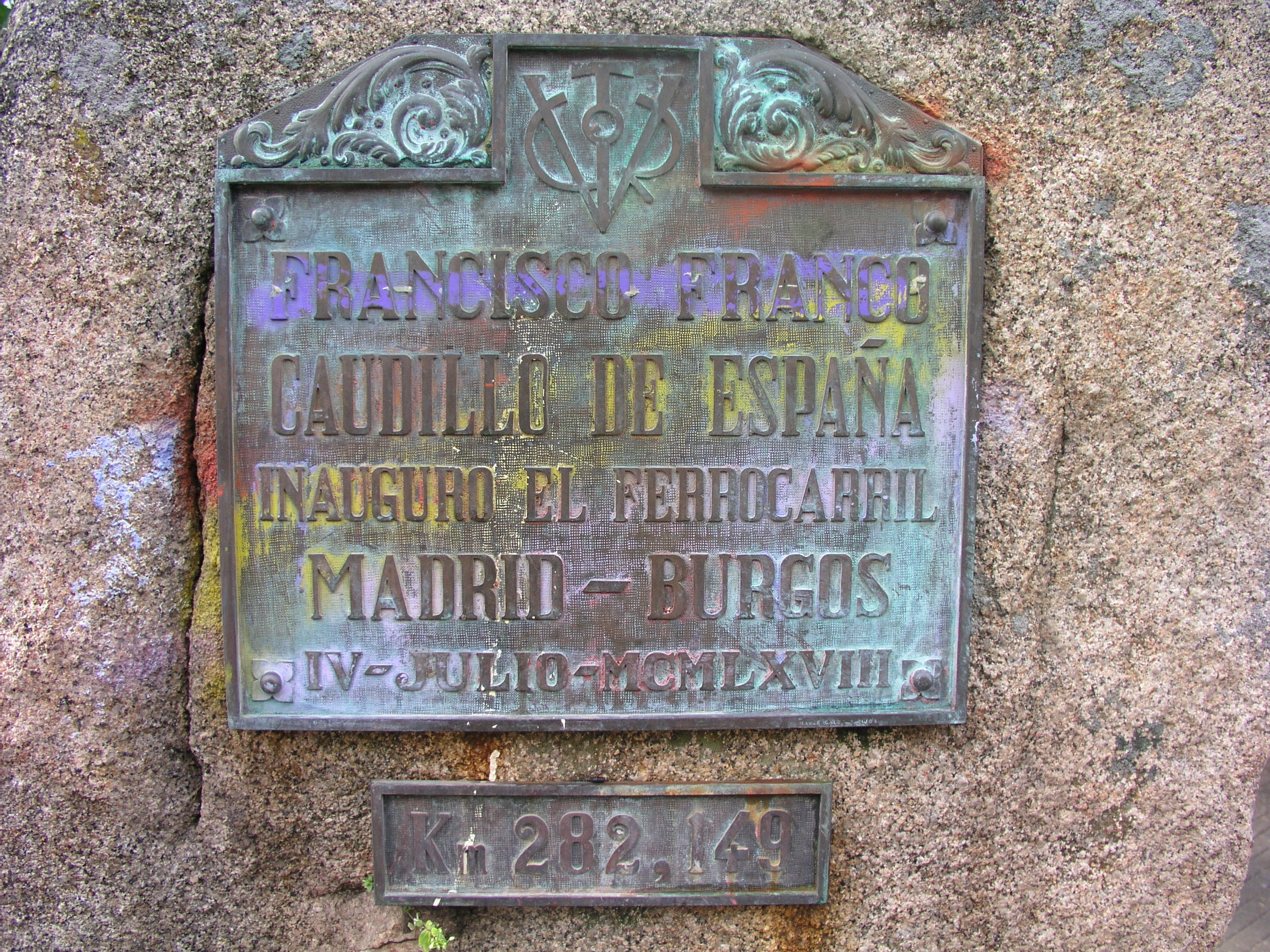
Victor sign used as a symbol of Francisco Franco, on a plaque commemorating the opening of a railway line between Madrid and Burgos in 1968.

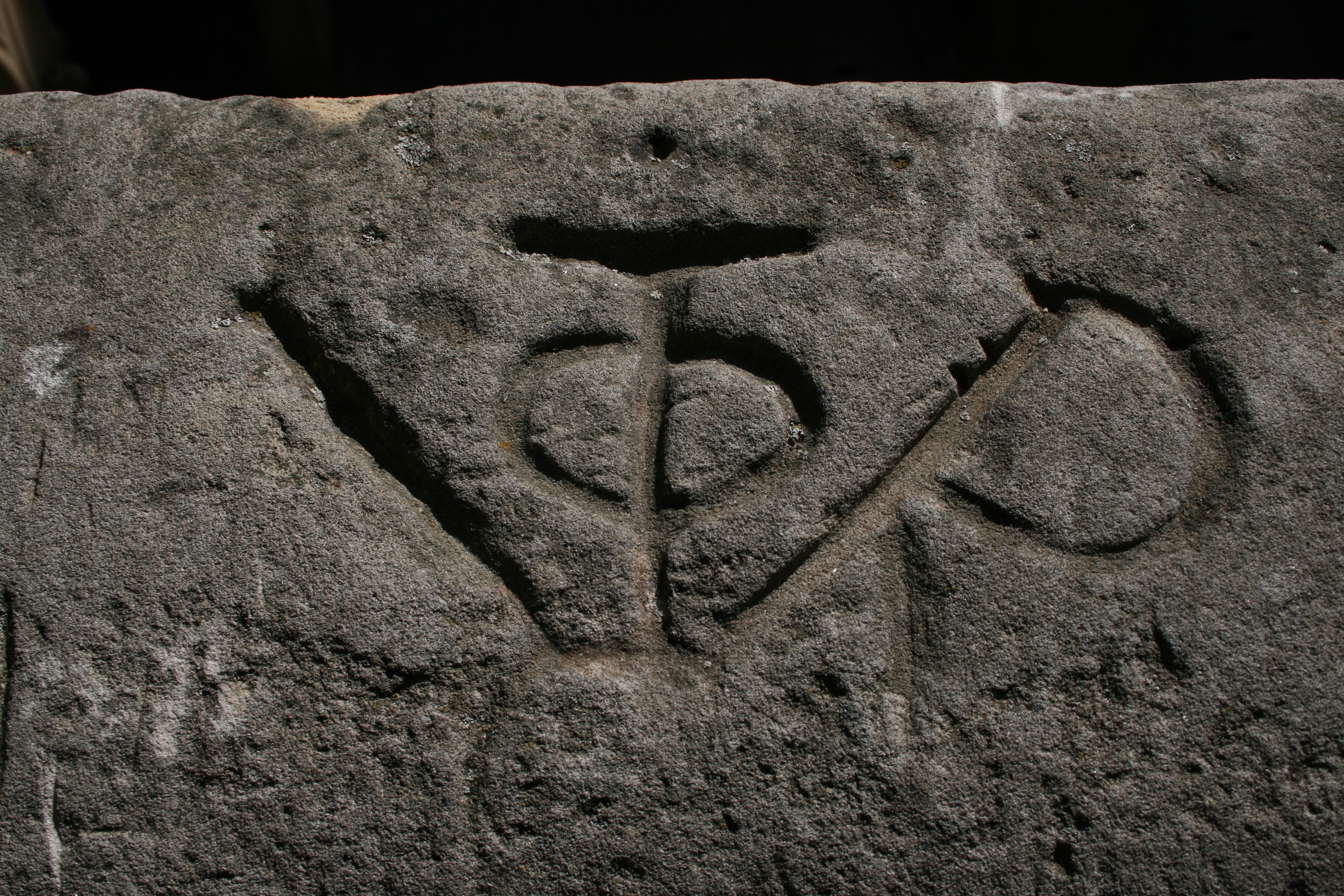
A victor symbol engraved in stone in Salamanca.

== See also ==
- Varsity letter – Award in American schools
