= Miraveche =

Coordinates: 42°40′N 3°12′W

- Municipality
- Flag Coat of arms

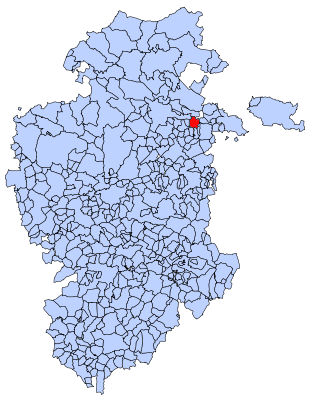
- Municipal location of Miraveche in Burgos province
- Country: Spain
- Autonomous community: Castile and León
- Province: Burgos
- Comarca: La Bureba

Area
  - Total: 22 km^{2} (8.5 sq mi)
- Elevation: 799 m (2,621 ft)

Population (2025-01-01)
  - Total: 92
  - Density: 4.2/km^{2} (11/sq mi)
- Time zone: UTC+1 (CET)
  - Summer (DST): UTC+2 (CEST)
- Postal code: 09280
- Website: http://www.miraveche.es/

Miraveche is a municipality and town located in the province of Burgos, Castile and León, Spain. According to the 2004 census (INE), the municipality has a population of 106 inhabitants.
