= Santibáñez de Vidriales =

Coordinates: 42°04′N 6°01′W

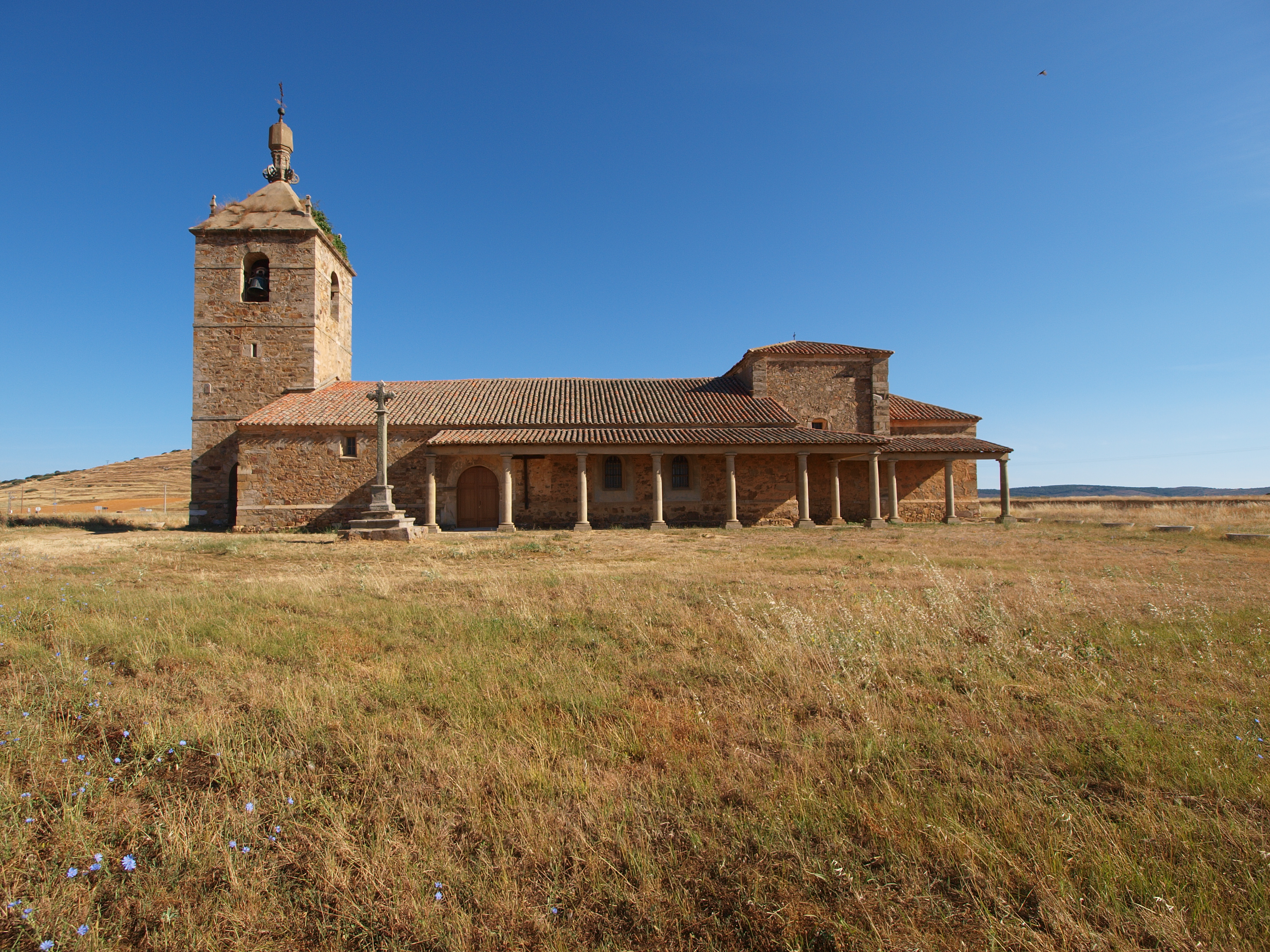

- Flag Coat of arms
- Interactive map of Santibáñez de Vidriales
- Country: Spain
- Autonomous community: Castile and León
- Province: Zamora
- Municipality: Santibáñez de Vidriales

Area
  - Total: 76 km^{2} (29 sq mi)

Population (2025-01-01)
  - Total: 846
  - Density: 11/km^{2} (29/sq mi)
- Time zone: UTC+1 (CET)
  - Summer (DST): UTC+2 (CEST)
- Website: Official website

Santibáñez de Vidriales is a municipality located in the province of Zamora, Castile and León, Spain. According to the 2004 census (INE), the municipality has 1,287 inhabitants.
