= Gallaeci =

Ancient tribal complex in Northwest Iberia

The Iberian Peninsula in the 3rd century BC.

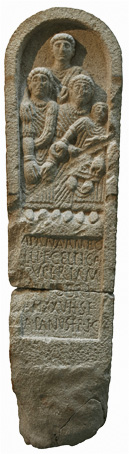
Galician-Roman Stele from Crecente (Galicia). Held at the end of the century, was dedicated to a deceased aristocrat called Apana, from the Callaecian tribe of Celtici Supertamarici, as can be read at the bottom of the stele itself.

The Callaeci (also Callaici in the earliest sources and Callaeci and Gallaeci in later sources; Ancient Greek: Καλλαϊκοί) were a Late Iron Age tribal complex who inhabited the north-western corner of Iberia, a region roughly corresponding to what is now Galicia, the Norte Region in Portugal, as well as the Spanish regions of western Asturias and western León before and during the Roman period. They spoke Indo-European dialects with Celtic and non-Celtic features, although their actual language is under discussion (see Callaecian language). The region was annexed by the Romans from the Lusitanian to the Cantabrian Wars, which paved the way for Romanization of the Callaeci over the following centuries.

The endonym of modern-day Galicians, galegos, derives directly from the name of this people.

== Archaeology ==
Archaeologically, the Iron Age Callaeci evolved from the local Atlantic Bronze Age culture (1300–700 BC). During the Iron Age they received additional influences, including from Southern Iberian and Celtiberian cultures, and from central-western Europe (Hallstatt and, to a lesser extent, La Tène culture), and from the Mediterranean (Phoenicians and Carthaginians). The Callaeci dwelt in hill forts (locally called castros), and the archaeological culture they developed is known by archaeologists as "Castro culture", characterised by their hillforts with round or elongated houses.

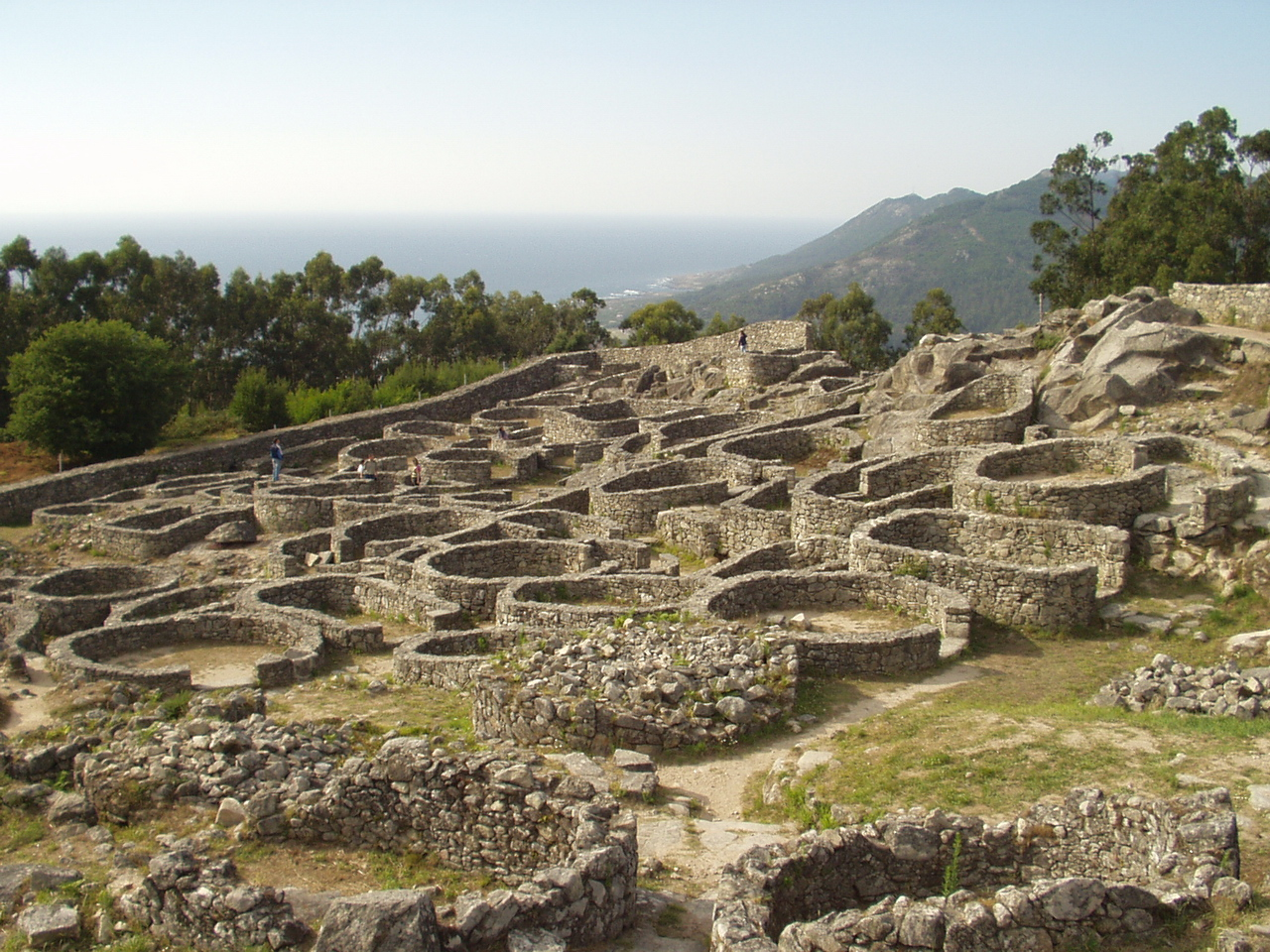
Partial view of the Castro de Santa Tegra, an oppidum from the 2nd century BC.

The Callaecian way of life was based in land occupation especially by fortified settlements that are known in Latin language as "castra" (hillforts) or "oppida" (citadels); they varied in size from small villages of less than one hectare (more common in the northern territory) to great walled citadels with more than 10 hectares sometimes denominated oppida, being these latter more common in the Southern half of their traditional settlement and around the Ave river.

Due to the dispersed nature of their settlements, large towns were rare in pre-Roman Callaecia although some medium-sized oppida have been identified, namely the obscure Portus Calle (also known as Cales or Cale; Castelo de Gaia, near Porto), Avobriga (Castro de Alvarelhos – Santo Tirso?), Tongobriga (Freixo – Marco de Canaveses), Brigantia (Bragança?), Tyde/Tude (Tui), Lugus (Lugo) and the Atlantic trading port of Brigantium (also designated Carunium; either Betanzos or A Coruña).

This livelihood in hillforts was common throughout Europe during the Bronze and Iron Ages, getting in the northwest of the Iberian Peninsula, the name of 'Castro culture" (Castrum culture) or "hillfort's culture", which alludes to this type of settlement prior to the Roman conquest. However, several Callaecian hillforts continued to be inhabited until the 5th century AD.

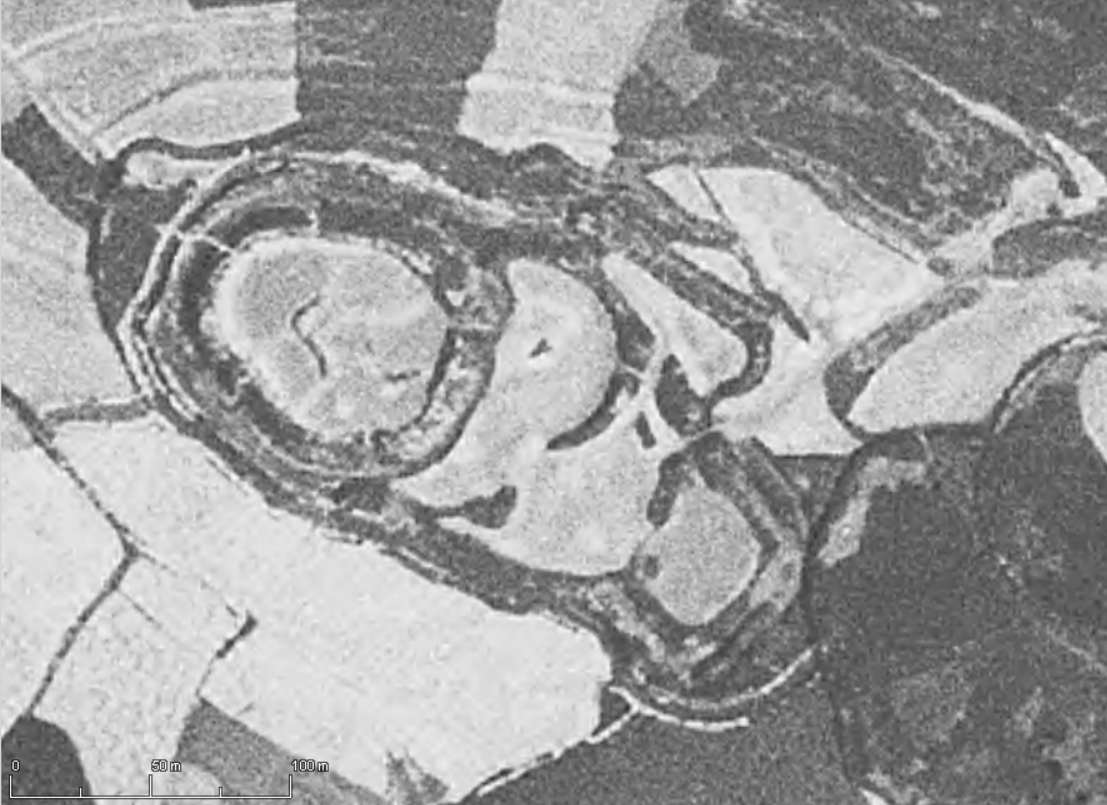
Aerial view of Castromaior, Portomarín, 1950

These fortified villages tended to be located in the hills, and occasionally rocky promontories and peninsulas near the seashore, as it improved visibility and control over territory. These settlements were strategically located for a better control of natural resources, including mineral ores such as iron. The Callaecian hillforts and oppidas maintained a great homogeneity and presented clear commonalities. The citadels, however, functioned as city-states and could have specific cultural traits.

The names of such hill-forts, as preserved in Latin inscriptions and other literary sources, were frequently composite nouns with a second element such as -bris (from proto-Celtic *brixs), -briga (from proto-Celtic *brigā), -ocelum (from proto-Celtic *okelo-), -dunum (from proto-Celtic *dūno-) all meaning "hill > hill-fort" or similar: Aviliobris, Letiobri, Talabriga, Nemetobriga, Louciocelo, Tarbucelo, Caladunum, etc. Others are superlative formations (from proto-Celtic *-isamo-, -(s)amo-): Berisamo (from *Bergisamo-), Sesmaca (from *Segisamo-). Many Galician modern day toponyms derive from these old settlements' names: Canzobre < Caranzovre < *Carantiobrixs, Trove < Talobre < *Talobrixs, Ombre < Anobre < *Anobrixs, Biobra < *Vidobriga, Bendollo < *Vindocelo, Andamollo < *Andamocelo, Osmo < Osamo < *Uxsamo, Sésamo < *Segisamo, Ledesma < *φletisama... Usually they combine this Celtic element with non-Celtic material, such as Paemeiobriga or Pezobre.

Associated archaeologically with the hill forts are the famous Callaecian warrior statues - slightly larger than life size statues of warriors, assumed to be deified local heroes.

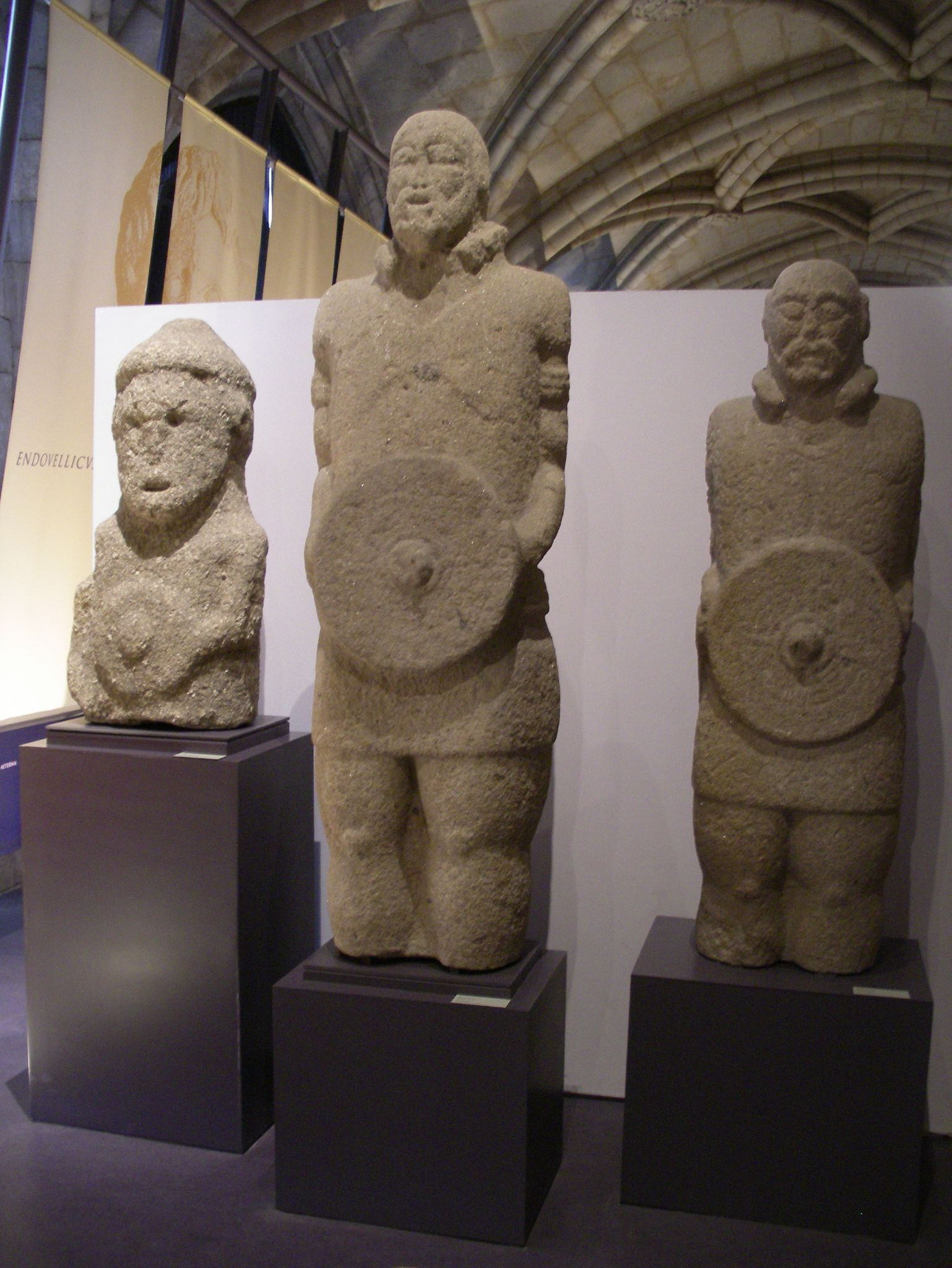
Granite Warrior statues are one of the most famous cultural outputs of the Callaeci

== Political-territorial organization ==
The Callaecian political organization is not known with certainty but it is very probable that they were divided into small independent chiefdoms who the Romans called populus or civitas, each one ruled by a local petty king or chief (princeps), as in other parts of Europe. Each populus comprised a sizeable number of small hillforts (castellum). So each Callaecian considered themselves a member of his or her populus and of the hillfort where they lived, as deduced by their usual onomastic formula: first Name + patronymic (genitive) + (optionally) populus or nation (nominative) + (optionally) origin of the person = name of their hill-fort (ablative):

- Nicer Clvtosi > Cavriaca principis Albionum: Nicer son of Clutosius, from (the hill-fort known as) Cauria, prince of the Albions.
- Apana Ambolli f Celtica Supertam(arica)> [---]obri: Apana daughter of Ambollus, a Supertamaric Celtic, from (the hill-fort known as) [-]obri.
- Anceitvs Vacci f Limicvs > Talabric(a): Ancetos son of Vaccios, a Limic, from (the hill-fort known as) Talabriga.
- Bassvs Medami f Grovvs > Verio: Bassos son of Medamos, a Grovian, from (the hill-fort known as) Verio.
- Ladronu[s] Dovai Bra[ca]rus Castell[o] Durbede: Ladronos son of Dovaios, a Bracaran, from the castle Durbeds.

=== Callaeci tribes ===
The list of Gallaeci tribes sorted by minority groups:

Bracarenses

- Abobrigenses
- Aquaflavienses / Aquiflavienses
- Bracari
- Bibali
- Caladuni
- Coelerni
- Equaesi
- Gallaeci Proper / Callaeci Proper
- Grovii / Grovi
- Helleni
- Interamici / Interamnici
- Leuni
- Luanqui
- Lubaeni
- Limici
- Narbasi
- Nemetati
- Quaquerni / Quarquerni / Querquerni
- Seurbi
- Tamagani
- Turodi / Turodes

Lucenses

- Adovi / Iadovi
- Albiones
- Arroni
- Arrotrebae / Artabri
- Baedi
- Capori / Copori
- Celtici Praestamarici
- Celtici Supertamarici
- Cibarci / Cabarci
- Cileni / Celeni
- Egi / Egovarri / Varri Namarini
- Lemavi
- Nerii / Neri
- Seurri

Other minor groups

- Aebocosi
- Amphilochi
- Artodii
- Aunonenses
- Banienses
- Barhantes
- Brassii
- Brigantes (Gallaecian tribe)
- Cuci
- Iadones
- Lapatianci
- Louguei
- Naebisoci / Aebisoci
- Namarii
- Poemani
- Segodii
- Tongobrigenses

Pomponius Mela, who described the Galician seashore and their dwellers around 40 AD, divided the coastal Callaeci in non-Celtic Grovii along the southern areas; the Celtic peoples who lived along the Rías Baixas and Costa da Morte regions in northern Galicia; and the also Celtic Artabri who dwelled all along the northern coast in between the latter and the Astures. Other authors, such as Strabo or Pliny the Elder, gave more nuanced views of the Callaecian ethnography.

== Etymology ==
The Romans named the entire region north of the Douro, where the Castro culture existed, in honour of the castro people that settled in the area of Calle — the Callaeci. The Romans established a port in the south of the region which they called Portus Cale, today's Porto, in northern Portugal. When the Romans first conquered the Callaeci they ruled them as part of the province of Lusitania but later created a new province of Callaecia (Greek: Καλλαικία) or Callaecia.

The names "Callaici" and "Calle" are the origin of today's Gaia, Galicia, and the "Gal" root in "Portugal", among many other placenames in the region.

== Callaecian language ==
Callaeci spoke Indo-European dialects with Celtic and non-Celtic features, although their actual kinship is under discussion (see Callaecian language). As is the case for Illyrian or Ligurian languages, its corpus is composed of isolated words and short sentences contained in local Latin inscriptions, or glossed by classic authors, together with a considerable number of names – anthroponyms, ethnonyms, theonyms, toponyms – contained in inscriptions, or surviving up to date as place, river or mountain names.

== Callaecian deities ==
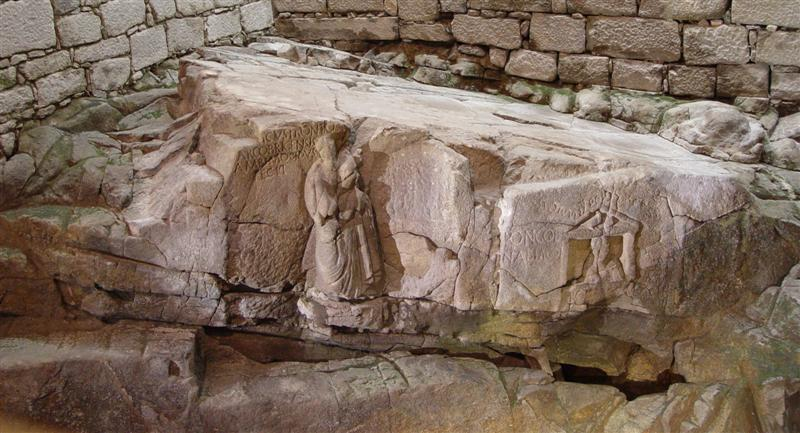
The Fonte do Ídolo (Portuguese for Idol's Fountain), in Braga.

Through the Callaecian-Roman inscriptions, is known part of the great pantheon of Callaecian deities, sharing part not only by other Celtic or Celticized peoples in the Iberian Peninsula, such as Astur — especially the more Western — or Lusitanian, but also by Gauls and Britons among others. This will highlight the following:

- Bandua: Callaecian God of War, similar to the Roman god, Mars. Great success among the Callaeci of Braga.
- Berobreus: god of the Otherworld and beyond. The largest shrine dedicated to Berobreo documented until now, stood in the fort of the Torch of Donón (Cangas), in the Morrazo's Peninsula, front of the Cíes Islands.
- Bormanicus: god of hot springs similar to the Gaulish god, Bormanus.
- Nabia: goddess of waters, of fountains and rivers. In Galicia and Portugal still nowadays, numerous rivers that still persist with his name, as the river Navia, ships and in northern Portugal there is the Idol Fountain, dedicated to the goddess ship.
- Cossus, warrior god, who attained great popularity among the Southern Callaeci, was one of the most revered gods in ancient Callaecia. Several authors suggest that Cosso and Bandua are the same God under different names.
- Reue, associated with the supreme God hierarchy, justice and also death.
- Lugus, or Lucubo, linked to prosperity, trade and craft occupations. He is one of gods most common among the Celts and many place names are derived from his name.
- Coventina, goddess of abundance and fertility. Strongly associated with the water nymphs, their cult record for most Western Europe, from England to Callaecia.
- Endovelicus (Belenus), god of prophecy and healing, showing the faithful in dreams.

== History ==
The fact that the Callaeci did not adopt writing until contact with the Romans constrains the study of their earlier history. However, early allusions to the Callaeci are present in ancient Greek and Latin authors prior to the conquest, which allows the reconstruction of a few historical events of this people since the second century BC. The oldest known inscription referring to the Callaeci (reading Ἔθνο[υς] Καλλαϊκῶ[ν], "people of the Callaeci") was found in 1981 in the Sebasteion of Aphrodisias, Turkey, where a triumphal monument to Augustus mentions them among other fifteen nations allegedly conquered by this Roman emperor.

Protected by their mountainous country and its isolation, the Gallaican tribes did not fell under Carthaginian rule in the 3rd century BC, though a combined Callaeci-Lusitani mercenary contingent led by a chieftain named Viriathus (not to be confused with the later Lusitani general bearing the same name that battled the Romans in the mid-2nd century BC) is mentioned in Hannibal's army during his march to Italy during the Second Punic War, participating in the battles of Lake Trasimene and Cannae.

On his epic poem Punica, Silius Italicus gives a short description of these mercenaries and their military tactics:

[…] Fibrarum et pennae divinarumque sagacem flammarum misit dives Gallaecia pubem, barbara nunc patriis ululantem carmina linguis, nunc pedis alterno percussa verbere terra ad numerum resonas gaudentem plauder caetras […]

Rich Gallaecia sent its youths, wise in the knowledge of divination by the entrails of beasts, by feathers and flames, now howling barbarian songs in the tongues of their homelands, now alternately stamping the ground in their rhythmic dances until the ground rang, and accompanying the playing with sonorous shields.

The Callaeci came into direct contact with Rome relatively late, in the wake of the Roman punitive campaigns against their southern neighbours, the Lusitani and the Turduli Veteres. Regarded as hardy fighters, Callaeci warriors fought for the Lusitani during Viriathus' campaigns in the south, and in 138-136 BC they faced the first Roman incursion into their territory by consul Decimus Junius Brutus, whose campaign reached as far as the river Nimis (possibly the Minho or Miño). After seizing the town of Talabriga (Marnel, Lamas do Vouga – Águeda) from the Turduli Veteres, he crushed an allegedly 60,000-strong Callaeci relief army sent to support the Lusitani at a desperate and difficult battle near the Durius river, in which 50,000 Gallaicans were slain, 6,000 were taken prisoner and only a few managed to escape, before withdrawing south.

It remains unclear if the Callaeci participated actively in the Sertorian Wars, although a fragment of Sallust records the sertorian legate Marcus Perperna Veiento capturing the town of Cale in around 74 BC. Later in 61-60 BC the Propraetor of Hispania Ulterior Julius Caesar forced upon them the recognition of Roman suzerainty after defeating the northern Callaeci in a combined sea-and-land battle at Brigantium, but it remained mostly nominal until the outbreak of the first Astur-Cantabrian War in 29 BC. Again, the involvement of the Callaeci in the latter conflict remains obscure, with Paulus Orosius briefly mentioning that the Augustan legates Gaius Antistius Vetus and Gaius Firmius fought a difficult campaign to subdue the Callaeci tribes of the more remote forested and mountainous parts of Callaecia bordering the Atlantic Ocean, defeating them only after a series of severe battles, though no exact details are given. After conquering Callaecia, Augustus promptly used its territory – now part of his envisaged Transduriana Province, whose organization was entrusted to suffect consul Lucius Sestius Albanianus Quirinalis – as a springboard to his rear offensive against the Astures.

=== Romanization ===
In the later part of the 1st century BC military colonies were established at Portus Cale (Porto), Bracara Augusta (Braga), Lucus Augusti (Lugo) and Asturica Augusta (Astorga), with the pacified Callaeci tribes being integrated by Augustus into his new Hispania Tarraconensis province. Later in the 3rd century AD, Emperor Diocletian created an administrative division which included the Conventus of Callaecia, Asturica and, perhaps, Cluniense into the new province of Callaecia (Greek: Kallaikia), with Bracara Augusta as the new provincial capital. Callaecia during the Empire became a recruiting district of auxiliary troops (auxilia) for the Roman Army and Gallaican auxiliary cavalry (equitatae) and infantry (peditatae) units (Cohors II Lucensium, Cohors III Lucensium, Cohors I Bracaraugustanorum, Cohors III Bracaraugustanorum, Cohors III Callaecorum Bracaraugustanorum, Cohors V Callaecorum Lucensium, Cohors VI Braecarorum, Cohors I Asturum et Callaecorum) distinguished themselves during Emperor Claudius' conquest of Britain in AD 43-60.

The region remained one of the last redoubts of Celtic culture and language in the Iberian Peninsula well into the Roman imperial period, at least until the spread of Christianity and the Germanic invasions of the late 4th/early 5th centuries AD, when it was conquered by the Suevi and their Hasdingi Vandals' allies.

== See also ==
- Albiones
- Astures
- Cantabri
- Castro culture
- Celtici
- Callaecia
- Callaecian warrior statues
- Galician Institute for Celtic Studies
- Prehistoric Iberia
- Pre-Roman peoples of the Iberian Peninsula
