= List of ancient peoples of Portugal =

In what is today's mainland Portugal territory, before the rule of the Roman Empire, several peoples and tribes were living there for many centuries and they had their own culture, language and political organization (tribal chiefdoms, tribal confederations and early forms of kingdoms and states), these peoples and tribes were in the Iron Age.

Nearly all or maybe all of these peoples and tribes were Celtic Indo-Europeans (Hispano-Celtic/Iberian Celts), Pre-Celtic Indo-Europeans or heavily celticized peoples.

Although there is today a strong identification of the Lusitanians with the territory of modern Portugal, not all the territory were dwelt by the Lusitanians, they were themselves a tribal confederation (they dwelt mainly between the rivers Tagus and Douro in central Portugal, Beira and Estremadura, and parts of the Spanish western Extremadura), other peoples and tribes speaking other languages and with distinct cultures (although related to some point) also lived in the centre, south and north of the modern Portuguese territory. It was the number and predominance of the Lusitanians regarding other peoples and tribes that caused this identification.

With the Roman conquest, the modern territory of Portugal south of the Douro river belonged to the Hispania Ulterior province. After that, in 27 BC, it was created the province of Lusitania (by Augustus) that initially covered the entire western side of the Iberian peninsula including Gallaecia and Asturias, but soon after, these later territories, north of the Douro river, were incorporated in the Hispania Tarraconensis province, an administrative division that lasted until the end of the Roman Empire. The province of Lusitania corresponded roughly with the territories of the Lusitanians (Lusitani), the Turduli Oppidani, the Vettones, the Celtici and the Cynetes and also of the Gallaeci and the Astures for a short period of time.

After the fall of the West Roman Empire, the name Lusitania continued to be used for administrative purposes but in the 9th century CE the name Portugal (a place name that started to be used in the territories north of the Douro river in south Gallaecia) started to be applied to the name of a county, the County of Portucale, and then, after independence from the Kingdom of León, to all the country, replacing the name Lusitania by the name Portugal.

== Peoples and tribes that lived in the territory of modern Portugal ==
Map showing the main pre-Roman tribes in Portugal and their main migrations. Turduli movement in red, Celtici in brown and Lusitanian in a blue colour. Most tribes neighbouring the Lusitanians were dependent on them. Names are in Latin.

Tribes, often known by their Latin names, living in the area of modern Portugal, prior to Roman rule:

- Indo-Europeans
  - Celts
    - Astures tribes (north of Douro river, east Trás-os-Montes, between Douro and Sabor river, and in the area of Miranda do Douro)
      - Zoelae - living in the mountains of Serra da Nogueira, Sanabria and Culebra, up to the mountains of Mogadouro, in the area of Miranda do Douro, Northeasthern Portugal, and adjacent areas of Galicia.
    - Callaeci/Gallaeci tribes (north of Douro river, in today's northern Portugal)
      - Bracari/Callaici Proper - living north of the River Douro, between the rivers Tâmega and Cávado, in Western Porto District, in the area of the modern city of Porto and in the area of the modern city of Braga;
      - Coelerni - living in the mountains between the rivers Tua and Sabor;
      - Equaesi - living in the most mountainous region of modern Portugal;
      - Grovii - a mysterious tribe living in the Minho valley;
      - Interamici - living in Trás-os-Montes and in the border areas with Galicia (in modern Spain);
      - Leuni - living between the rivers Lima and Minho;
      - Limici - living in the swamps of the river Lima, on the border between Portugal and Galicia);
      - Luanqui - living between the rivers Tâmega and Tua;
      - Narbasi - living in the north of modern Portugal (interior) and nearby area of southern Galicia;
      - Nemetati - living north of the Douro Valley in the area of Mondim;
      - Quaquerni - living in the mountains at the mouths of rivers Cavado and Tâmega;
      - Seurbi - living between the rivers Cávado and Lima (or even reaching the river Minho);
      - Tamagani - from the area of Chaves, near the river Tâmega;
      - Turodi - living in Trás-os-Montes and bordering areas of Galicia;
    - Celtici tribes - Celts living in Alentejo.
      - Cempsi
      - Conii - according to some scholars, Conii and Cynetes were two different peoples or tribes and the names were not two different names of the same people or tribe; in this case, the Conii may have dwelt along the northern banks of the middle Anas (Guadiana) river, in today's western Extremadura region of Spain, and were a Celtici tribe wrongly confused with the Cynetes of Cyneticum (Algarve) that dwelt from the west banks of the Low Anas (Guadiana) river further to the south (the celticization of the Cynetes by the Celtici confused the distinction between the two peoples or tribes).
      - Mirobrigenses
      - Sefes
    - Cynetes tribes - living in Cyneticum (today's Algarve) and the south of today's Alentejo. - Originally probably Tartessians or similar, later celtized by the Celtici; according to some scholars, Cynetes and Conii were two different peoples or tribes
    - Turduli peoples or tribes (along the coast between the Douro and Tagus and also towards Sado River)
      - Turduli Bardili - living in the Setúbal peninsula;
      - Turduli Baetici/Turduli Baetures - living in Baeturia/Baeturia Turdulorum (ancient northern region of Baetica Province), in the east of Alentejo, East Beja District, Portugal Southeastern corner, east of the Anas (Guadiana) river.
      - Turduli Oppidani - Turduli living in the Portuguese region of Estremadura;
      - Turduli Veteres - the "ancient Turduli" living south of the estuary of the river Douro, Aveiro District.
  - Lusitani-Vettones (Celtic? Pre-Celtic Indo-European?)
    - Lusitanian tribes (Lusitani/Bellitani) - being the most numerous and dominant of the region (between Douro and Tagus rivers), (may have been heavily celticized pre-Celtic Indo-European tribes and not Celtic tribes proper).
      - Arabrigenses
      - Aravi
      - Coelarni/Colarni
      - Interamnienses
      - Lancienses
        - Lancienses Oppidani
        - Lancienses Transcudani
        - Ocelenses Lancienses
      - Meidubrigenses
      - Paesuri - Douro and Vouga (Portugal)
      - Palanti (according to some scholars, these tribes were Lusitanians and not Vettones)
        - Calontienses
        - Caluri
        - Coerenses
      - Tangi
        - Elbocori
        - Igaeditani
        - Tapori/Tapoli - River Tagus, around the border area of Portugal and Spain
      - Talures - in the northern slopes of Serra da Estrela and Mondego River headwaters
      - Veaminicori
    - Vettones tribes - living in a corner of today's Guarda District, in the east banks of middle and low Côa river (called Cola or Cuda in Roman times) closely related to the Lusitanians. (may have been heavily celticized pre-Celtic Indo-European tribes and not Celtic tribes proper)
  - Turdetani tribes (Celtic? Pre-Celtic Indo-European?) (may have been heavily celticized pre-Celtic Indo-European tribes and not Celtic tribes proper)
    - Elbisini/Olbisini/Eloesti - in the far southeastern corner of Portugal and in dispersed communities.

== See also ==
- Pre-Roman peoples of the Iberian Peninsula
- List of Celtic tribes
- Lusitanians
- History of Portugal
- Roman expansion
- Romanization of Hispania
