= -tania =

Suffix used for place names

The suffix -tania or -etania (English demonym "-tanian", "-tanians") (Note: Latin, -tanum; Spanish, -tano / -tana / -tanos / -tanas) denotes a territory or region in the Iberian Peninsula. Its historical origin is in the pre-Roman Iberia. Its etymological origin is discussed by linguists. Spanish Jesuit philologist Hervás y Panduro proposed their link to the Celtic languages, in which the root *tan or *taín means department or region. "In Irish, tan (genitive, tain) expresses the idea of country, territory."

Other philologists such as Pablo Pedro Astarloa suggest a combination of the Basque abundance suffix *-eta (as in Arteta, Lusarreta, Olleta) with the Latin root *nia used in place names (such as Romania, Hispania, Italia).

The form of demonym used by some epigraphs in the Iberian language found in coins is -ken or -sken, as in Ikalesken, which is unrelated to the Latin-Hispanic -tanus. This suggests that -tania may be a denomination of Roman origin. According to the historian and archaeologist Manuel Gómez-Moreno, the Latin suffix -tani corresponds to the Iberian -scen, For example, the Ausetanians (Ausetani) who called themselves Ausesken. The Romans also applied this suffix to other peoples of the western Mediterranean (Sardinia and Sicily), and to a lesser extent to those of the Italian Peninsula, where however the suffix -ates prevails. Before Roman contact with the Iberian peoples, there were already Greek colonies in Iberia. The ancient Greeks used the older suffix -ητες (-etes), -εται or -ηται (-etai), which would be replaced by -ητανοι or -ετανοι (-etani), according to researcher Ulrich Schmoll (1953).

Another theory, partially developed by the Aragonese jurist Joaquín Costa, relates that suffix to the Berber *ait, which means both "son of" and "the tribe", or with *at, meaning "people." This theory supports that "aide" (aita) is a relative in Basque.

== Examples ==
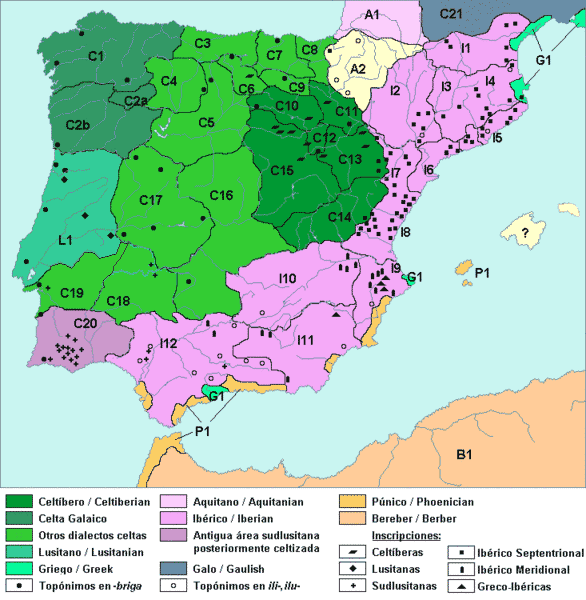
Linguistic families of the Iberian Peninsula before Romanization C1: Galaicos / C2b: Brácaros / C3: Cántabros / C4: Astures / C5: Vacceos / C6: Turmogos / C7: Autrigones-Caristios / C8: Várdulos / C9: Berones / C10: Pelendones / C11: Belos / C12: Lusones / C13: Titos / C14: Olcades / C15: Arévacos / C16: Carpetanos / C17: Vetones / C18-C19: Célticos / C20: Conios / L1: Lusitanos / I1: Ceretanos / I2: Ilergetes / I3: Lacetanos / I4: Indigetes / I5: Layetanos / I6: Ilercavones / I7: Sedetanos / I8: Edetanos / I9: Contestanos / I10: Oretanos / I11: Bastetanos / I12: Turdetanos / G21: Galos / G1: Griegos / P1: Fenicios/Cartagineses / B1: Bereberes.

- Accitania
- Ausetania, nowadays Osona.
- Bergistania, nowadays Berga.
- Bastetania
- Carpetania
- Ceretania
- Contestania, nowadays Cocentaina.
- Cosetania
- Ilergitania, nowadays Lérida.
- Ilorcitania, nowadays Lorquí.
- La Jacetania
- Lacetania
- Layetania
- Lusitania
- Oretania
- Ossigitania
- Sedetania
- Turdetania

=== Outside the Iberian Peninsula ===
- Aquitania (Aquitaine)
- Mauritania
  - Tingitania or Transfretania
  - Zeugitania
- Occitania
  - Arpitania, which was created in the 70s of Arpes (Alps) and -tania (imitating Occitania)
- Tripolitania

== See also ==
- -land
- -stan
- -patnam

== Sources ==
- Campión, Arturo. Revista Bascongada (ed.). "Celtas, íberos y euskaros - Capítulo XIII: Estudio de la toponimia ibérica á la luz de la lengua euskara" (PDF). Archived from the original (PDF) on 3 June 2016.
