= Battle of Cissa =

218 BC battle in Spain, part of the Second Punic War

- Part of the Second Punic War
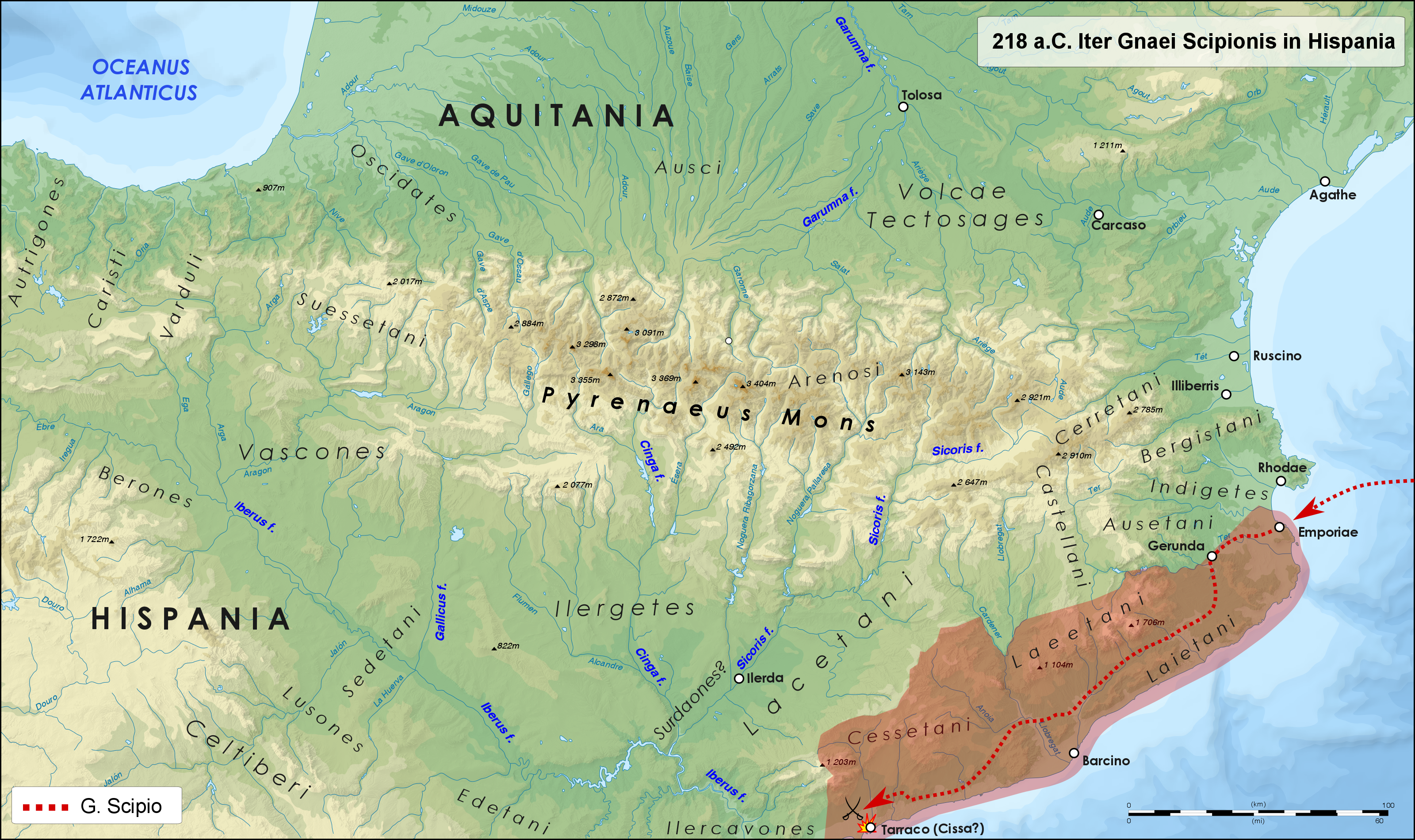
- Scipio's landing in Iberia
Date	Fall 218 BC
Location	Cissa or Tarraco, present-day Catalonia, Spain 41.1157°N 1.2496°E
Result	Roman victory

Belligerents
Roman Republic	Carthage

Commanders and leaders
Gnaeus Cornelius Scipio Calvus	Hanno (POW)

Strength
20,000 – 25,000: 8,000 Roman infantry; 6,000 heavy infantry; 2,000 skirmishers; 14,000 Italian allied infantry; 600 Roman cavalry; 1,600 Italian allied cavalry; unknown number of auxiliary Iberians	11,000: 10,000 infantry; 1,000 cavalry; unknown number of auxiliary Iberians

Casualties and losses
Unknown	8,000 6,000 killed 2,000 captured

The Battle of Cissa was part of the Second Punic War. It was fought in the fall of 218 BC, near the town of Tarraco in north-eastern Iberia. A Roman army under Gnaeus Cornelius Scipio Calvus defeated an outnumbered Carthaginian army under Hanno, thus gaining control of the territory north of the Ebro River that Hannibal had just subdued a few months prior in the summer of 218 BC. This was the first battle that the Romans had ever fought in Iberia. It allowed the Romans to establish a secure base among friendly Iberian tribes, and due to the eventual success of the Scipio brothers in Spain, Hannibal looked for but never received reinforcements from Spain during the war.

== Strategic situation ==
Hannibal's overland invasion of Italy was a highly risky venture, failure of which might have cost Carthage the war sooner, but he was forced to choose this strategy given the strategic limitations the Carthaginian empire faced in 218 BC, and this strategy had a better chance of succeeding than a seaborne invasion. Although sailing to Italy might have been faster and free from the hazards of a land march, at sea the entire fleet might be lost in a storm, and Roman naval dominance (Note: In 218 BC, Rome had commissioned 220 Quinqueremes, while Carthage had 32 quinqueremes manned in Spain and another 55 in Carthage. The largest fleet Carthage would launch during the war would have 130 quinqueremes, in 212 BC.) increased the risk to Hannibal's large armada, (Note: Scipio Africanus sailed to Africa in 204 BC with 2,200 cavalry and 26,000 infantry, and needed 400 transports to carry them to Africa through seas dominated by the Roman fleet. Hannibal would need at least double the number of transports and four times the horse transports to transport 50,000 infantry, 9,000 cavalry and 37 elephants to Italy.) as it risked suffering crippling losses from Roman naval attacks despite Carthaginian warship escorts. Fleets normally sailed along the coast and beached at night or after every 2–3 days for victuals, yet Carthage had no bases on the coast between the Balearic Islands and Italy, which were dominated by Roman ally Massalia and her colonies and wild Ligurians, and Rome also controlled Sardinia, Corsica and Sicily, thus effectively dominating the coast between Spain and Italy, so making a seaborne invasion more dangerous than a land one. Moreover, enough horse transports to carry 9,000 horses to Italy might not have been available for Hannibal. (Note: Before Hannibal left Italy in 203 BC, he was forced to build ships to augment the fleet Carthage had sent, and kill 3,000–4,000 horses because there were no transports available to carry them, these horses would have given Hannibal superiority in cavalry, 8,000 against 6,100 against Scipio at Zama in 202 BC.) An overland invasion, in contrast, would have the added advantage of achieving surprise. Hannibal needed to time his movements carefully to keep the Romans in the dark, for if the Romans got hint of his intentions, they had enough recourses to fight a multi-front war: they could send one army to block the Carthaginian army at the Pyrenees, station a strong force in Cisalpine Gaul, and invade Africa with another simultaneously; or stand on the defensive with overwhelming forces in North Italy. After the successful conclusion of the Siege of Saguntum, Hannibal did nothing to provoke the Romans; he dismissed his army and did not immediately march for Italy in the Spring of 218 BC after he received the news of war. He spent the months of March – May strengthening the defense of Spain and Africa by garrisoning these areas, which were not threatening to Roman mainland— serving a dual purpose: along with securing the areas against the expected Roman invasion, it also reinforced the Roman perception that Carthage would fight a defensive war along the lines of the First Punic War, so Hannibal's overland invasion caught Rome off guard.

=== Carthaginian deployments ===
Hannibal stationed Hasdrubal Barca, his younger brother at the head of 12,650 infantry, 2,550 cavalry (11,580 African infantry, 300 Ligurains, 500 Balearic slingers, 450 Liby-Phoenician 300 Spanish Ilergetes and 1,800 Numidian cavalry from Masaesyli, Massylii, Mauri and Maccoei tribes) and 21 elephants to guard the Carthaginian possessions south of the Ebro. and sent 20,000 Iberian soldiers to Africa (including 13,850 infantry and 1,200 cavalry from the Mastiani, Thersitae, Olcades and Oretes tribes, and 870 Balearic slingers), and 4,000 soldiers garrisoning Carthage itself, probably between March -May. Hasdrubal and Carthage could raise additional soldiers if needed to fight Romans, and Carthage was unlikely to fall to a singular consular army in a few months. (Note: A disarmed Carthage withstood a three year siege during the Third Punic War, while Scipio Africanus needed to campaign for two years in Africa before Carthage submitted.) Hannibal left Cartagena probably in late May or early June, timing his departure to allow the spring flooding of Spanish rivers to subside, ensuring the availability of food and fodder along the way, and after receiving envoys from Gallic tribes from the Po valley, who assured him of their willingness to cooperate against the Romans. Hannibal's army consisted of either 90,000 infantry and 12,000 cavalry, or 77,000 infantry and 10,000 cavalry, or with 26,000 infantry and 10,000 cavalry, and 37 elephants. The elephants were reported by Appian; there is no mention of the elephants by Polybius or Livy, so it has been speculated that the elephants may have been carried to Emporiae by sea. The Iberian contingent of the Punic navy, which numbered 50 quinqueremes (only 32 were manned) and 5 triremes, remained in Iberian waters, having shadowed Hannibal's army for some way. The army probably marched in smaller columns along a 5–7-mile (8.0–11.3 km) long stretch and the 290 mile march to the Ebro, during which they crossed the Sucor river and five major streams was uneventful, and the river was reached in the middle July.

== Roman preparations and strategy ==
Rome expected Carthaginians to fight a defensive war, as Hannibal had anticipated, and they planned to attack both Spain and Africa, the only aggressive move they expected from Carthage was some form of attack on Sicily and they did not expect an overland attack. The Roman strategy was for Scipio was to set off first, engage Hannibal either north of the Ebro or east of the Pyrenees or the Rhône, where he may receive aid from Iberians or Gauls, and after Scipio had located and engaged Hannibal's forces, Sempronius, who would be stationed in Sicily, would invade Africa. Carthage was a strong city that would have to be blockaded for several months before it starved, also relief armies had to be beaten off during the time but since 241 BC, Rome had not negotiated but always dictated terms to Carthage, which had always backed down, so the Romans probably expected that Carthage was now bluffing by refusing to accept Roman terms and would capitulate as soon a Roman army blockaded the city, or roused the Numidians and Libyans to rebel against Carthage and decisively defeat Carthage. Carthage came close to capitulation in 256–55 BC when Marcus Attilus Regulus invaded Africa and if Scipio could keep Hannibal away from Africa long enough Sempronius could repeat the feat by making Carthage agree to terms or the political opponents of Barcids, some of whom had relations with Roman senators might assume power or trigger the recall Hannibal and accept Roman demands. The Roman navy had been mobilized in 219 BC, fielding 220 quinqueremes for the Second Illyrian War. Consul Tiberius Sempronius Longus received 4 legions (Note: 2 Roman and 2 allied, 8,000 Roman and 16,000 allied infantry and 600 Roman and 1,800 allied cavalry) and instructions to sail for Africa with 160 quinqueremes. Publius Cornelius Scipio received 4 legions (Note: 8,000 Roman and 14,000 allied infantry and 600 Roman and 1,600 allied cavalry) and was to sail for Iberia escorted by 60 ships.

=== Delay of Scipio ===
The Consuls took office in March and began organizing their forces, however, before Scipio's army was ready, the Boii and the Insubres, two major Gallic tribes in Cisalpine Gaul (modern northern Italy), antagonized by the founding of several Roman colonies on traditionally Gallic territory, and perhaps enticed by agents of Hannibal, attacked the Roman colonies of Placentia and Cremona, causing the Romans to flee to Mutina, which the Gauls then besieged. This probably occurred in April or May of 218 BC, the Roman Senate prioritized the defense of Italy over the overseas expedition, and Praetor Peregrinus Lucius Manlius Vulso marched from Ariminum with 600 Roman cavalry, 10,000 allied infantry and 1,000 allied cavalry, detached from Scipio's army, towards Cisalpine Gaul to aid the besieged Romans.

The Army of Manlius marched from Ariminum towards Mutina, and was ambushed twice on the way, losing 1,200 men and six standards, although they relieved Mutina, the army fell under a loose siege a few miles from Mutina at Tannetum. The Roman Senate now took one Roman and one allied legion (10,000 men) from the army of Scipio again and sent it to the Po valley under the command of Praetor Urbanus Gaius Atillius Serranus. As Atillius neared Tannetum, the Gauls retired without battle, and the Romans spent the summer of 218 BC recovering and fortifying Placentia and Cremona, probably in a two month long operation. Sempronius remained in Rome until June/July, his army acting as a strategic reserve should more troops be needed in Cisalpine Gaul, Rome did not respond to the Carthaginian naval raids against Sicily and Lipari. Hannibal's passivity and non-threatening defensive dispositions during March – May probably influenced this decision by reinforcing the Roman perception they were fighting a repeat of the first war and the initiative lay with them. The Romans did not believe Hannibal would invade Italy, when they received news, probably in July, that Hannibal had crossed the Ebro, they probably assumed Hannibal's Catalonia campaign was part of securing Spain by subduing pro Roman tribes and creating a forward base. The Senate did not change the plan, Sempronius moved his forces to Sicily as planned while Scipio continued his preparations, to intercept Hannibal in Gaul. As a result, the departure of Scipo was delayed by two to three months.

== The trans-Ebro Campaign ==
A generic representation of the strategic situation during Hannibal's Catalonia campaign, July–August 218 BC, not to exact scale

While Scipio raised new troops in Italy, the Carthaginian army crossed the Ebro River unopposed, in three columns: the northernmost detachment crossed at the confluence of the Ebro and Sicoris River and then proceeded along the river valley into the mountain countries, the central column crossed the Ebro at the oppidum of Mora and marched inland, the main column under Hannibal, along with the treasure chests and elephants, crossed the Ebro probably at the town of Adeba, and proceeded directly along the coast through Tarraco, Barcino, Gerunda, Emporiae and Illiberis. The separate detachments marched in such a way as to provide mutual support if needed, and the coastal detachment under Hannibal was also tasked with countering any possible Roman intervention. The area bordered Rhoda and Emporiae, colonies of Roman-allied Greek Massalia, so some of the neighboring tribes may have been pro Roman due to their influence.

Hannibal spent the months of July and August of 218 BC crossing the two hundred miles from the Ebro River to the Pyrenees, conquering the area by campaigning against the “Illurgetes” (perhaps not the Ilergetes at Lleida who were pro Carthaginian, but probably another obscure tribe between Tarraco and Barcino), the Bargusii at Serga valley, the Ausetani between Ausa (Vich) and Gerona along with the Lacetani, the Aeronosii, and the Andosini tribes. Hannibal stormed a number of unspecified cities and this campaign aimed to subdue region as quickly as possible, leading to heavy Carthaginian casualties. (Note: Hannibal had lost 22,000 soldiers in the space of two months, possibly to desertion of raw recruits and to the heavy losses incurred while storming walled cities.) After subduing the Iberian tribes but leaving the Greek cities unmolested, Hannibal reorganized his army. A general named Hanno, who has been identified by various authors as Hannibal's nephew (son of Hasdrubal the Fair), a brother, or no Barcid relation, garrisoned the newly conquered territory north of the Ebro with 10,000 infantry and 1,000 cavalry, and based himself specifically to watch over the Bargusii, a pro-Roman tribe. Hanno also guarded the communication line with Hasdrubal Barca, and the heavy baggage left by Hannibal near a camp at Cissa.

Hannibal next released 3,000 Carpetani soldiers, along with 7,000 other warriors of dubious loyalty, so the Carthaginian army now numbered 50,000 infantry and 9,000 cavalry and 37 elephants. The Carthaginian detachments next crossed the Pyrenees Mountains into Gaul and regrouped at Illiberis in early September of 218 BC. They probably avoided the coastal road, as it contains many forested gorges and moved either through the Col de Banyuls or Col du Perthus or Col de la Perche, avoiding the Greeks in the coast altogether. The trans-Ebro campaign allowed Hannibal to give his new recruits valuable combat experience, and impress upon the Iberian tribes the extent of the power of Carthage, especially those which might have been influenced by the Greek colonies of Massalia, which were not captured, and his shedding of unwilling troops and heavy baggage allowed him to form a more mobile, streamlined, loyal, battle-hardened experienced army, also reduce his supply and provisioning burden by decreasing the number of soldiers, pack animals and size of the baggage train. Hannibal probably now abandoned any thoughts of fighting the Romans, as the season was getting late, and focused on quickly reaching Italy.

=== Hannibal eludes Scipio ===
A generic representation of the strategic situation during Hannibal's crossing of the Rhône, in mid-September 218 BC, not to exact scale

Hannibal had spent 3 months marching from Cartagena to the Pyrenees; however, he would take three weeks to reach the Rhône. Hannibal had placated the Gallic chieftains —who had met at Ruscino for discussion on the Carthaginian expedition after mustering an army— with assurances of his peaceful intentions, accompanied by generous gifts, and then marched past Ruscino unmolested, along the future Via Domitia to Nemasus, the Volcae capital, and without any incidents reached the west bank of the Rhône by late September. Hannibal's negotiation skills and war chest were put to good use to placate individual Gallic tribes on the way, so the foraging of the Carthaginians caused no friction; supplies may also have been purchased from the Gauls as no reports exist of any fighting taking place during his march. Hannibal was opposed by some Gallic tribes at the Rhône, and lost days defeating the Gauls, which enabled Scipio to locate him by pure chance when he landed with his army at the allied Greek city of Massilia in mid September. Scipio had already known before setting sail that Hannibal had crossed the Ebro, and assumed that the Carthaginians were still engaged beyond the Pyrenees, so he disembarked his troops, made camp, unloaded his heavy baggage, and allowed his soldiers to recuperate from their sea voyage. Scipio expected Hannibal to fight his way to the Rhône, and arrive exhausted and weakened, so he did not send out scouts to find out exactly where the Carthaginian army was, as he believed Hannibal was many days march away.

Scipio was thus astonished to learn in Massalia that Hannibal had already crossed the Pyrenees and the Carthaginians were approaching the Rhône with amazing speed. Scipio immediately dispatched 300 cavalry up the eastern bank of the river, unaware that Hannibal's army was only four days march upstream, just as Hannibal was not aware of the Roman army. The Roman cavalry clashed with a similar force of Numidian light cavalry and, after a hard-fought skirmish, drove off the Carthaginians and located the Carthaginian camp. Hannibal decided not to fight the Romans, because even a victory could cause casualties that would slow his march and force him to winter in Gaul, thus giving the Romans the opportunity to amass overwhelming forces in the Po valley the following spring, and defeating his strategy to gain an operational base, provisions and reinforcements from the Gauls.

Scipio marched north from his base to engage Hannibal, while Hannibal marched east towards the Alps. Arriving at the deserted Carthaginian camp, Scipio learned that Hannibal was three day's march away. Scipio decided against following Hannibal into the Alps, as his army was not equipped and provisioned for a winter campaign, and marching in unknown territory risked being ambushed by Gauls or the Carthaginians. Hannibal had scuttled the Roman plan by reaching the Rhône faster than the Romans expected, and made Publius Scipio fail in his mission to contain Hannibal in Spain or Gaul, and this risked ruining the entire Roman strategic plan. After marching back to the seacoast, Scipio decided to send the bulk of his forces to Iberia under the command of his elder brother Gnaeus (who had been consul in 221 BC), while he himself returned to Northern Italy with a small escort to organize the defenses against Hannibal. This move served a dual purpose: Gnaeus Scipio would be able to block reinforcements from reaching Hannibal overland, thereby reaping fame and spoils; while Publius Scipio, if he could defeat Hannibal in Italy, would become the Savior of Rome; thus this would also ensure, in the Roman aristocratic competition for fame and fortune, that the glory of the entire campaign belonged to the Scipio family. The Roman scouts had discovered Hannibal's Camp in late September, which was an eight-day round trip from the Roman camp in the Rhône estuary, so Gnaeus Scipio probably reached Spain by sail in mid October.

== Prelude ==
The Romans had arrived in Iberia within four to five weeks of the departure of Hannibal from Catalonia, and caught Hanno, the Carthaginian commander in Catalonia, by complete surprise. Hanno had an army containing 10,000 infantry and 1,000 cavalry, and he was originally stationed to keep watch over the Bargusii, a pro-Roman tribe, but he had to march 150 miles south of Emporiae to subdue a rebellion, so the Carthaginians were in no position to oppose the Roman arrival, and Hanno probably did not have enough soldiers to do so even if he wished. Since the pro-Carthaginian tribes were located in the interior, Hanno probably did not bother with the coastal area, but instead withdrew inland to Cissa, a town that may have been located near Lleida near the pro-Carthaginian Ilergetes tribe. Hanno probably started raising Iberian levies, and Indibilis, chieftain of the Ilergetes who also held sway over the Lacetani and Sussateni tribes, probably commanded these troops. Hasdrubal Barca, who was in Cartagena nearly 300 miles away, was caught off guard by the sudden arrival of the Romans, and marched north to join Hanno with an army of 8,000 infantry and 1,000 cavalry.

Gnaeus Cornelius Scipio Calvus and his army arrived at Emporiae in Iberia under the escort of 60 quinqueremes. The Greek cities of Emporiae and Rhoda welcomed the Romans, and Gnaeus began to move south to win over the coastal tribes, some of whom were under the influence of the Massalian colonies and at odds with the inland tribes. Gnaeus sailed down the coast, unhindered by the Carthaginians, made some amphibious landings, using diplomacy, and failing that, besieging some town as a show of force for those who chose to resist, to create allies and ultimately gain control over the coast up to Tarraco, which surrendered to the Romans. The Carthaginian had chosen to remain on the defensive during this time, probably waiting for Hasdrubal to arrive and gathering troops from allied tribes. Gnaeus Scipio now marched inland towards Cissa where Hanno was based, using diplomacy and force if needed, and he continued to gather further allies. Scipio found the Carthaginian army entrenched near Cissa; however, Hanno, seeing the grip of the Carthaginians on the newly conquered tribes loosening, decided to offer battle, instead of waiting in his fortified camp for Hasdrubal to arrive.

== The battle ==
Cn. Scipio Campaign in Spain 218 BCE Part 1

The army of Publius Scipio originally had 8,000 Roman and 14,000 allied infantry, 600 Roman and 1,600 allied cavalry, bulk of which arrived in Spain. Scipio had garrisoned some communities, and also had raised Iberian axillaries troops, so his army may have numbered between 20,000–25,000 soldiers. Hanno initially had 11,000 soldiers, and he had gathered some troops from his Iberian allies, but his army was outnumbered by the Romans.

Cn. Scipio Campaign in Spain 218 BCE Part 2

There were no brilliant maneuvers or ambushes, the armies formed up and faced off. Being outnumbered two to one, Hanno was defeated relatively easily, losing 6,000 soldiers in battle. Furthermore, the Romans managed to capture the Carthaginian camp, along with 2,000 more soldiers and Hanno himself. The camp contained all the baggage left by Hannibal. The prisoners also included Indibilis, who would cause severe trouble for the Romans later. The Romans also stormed the town of Cissa, though to the frustration of the Romans it did not contain any valuable booty.

== Aftermath ==
Gnaeus became master of Iberia north of the Ebro. Hasdrubal, arriving too late to aid Hanno and not being strong enough to attack the Romans, still crossed the river and sent a flying column of light cavalry and infantry on a raid. This force caught some Roman sailors and marines foraging, and inflicted such casualties that the effectiveness of the Roman fleet in Iberia was reduced from 60 to 35 ships. The Roman fleet, however, raided the Carthaginian possessions in Iberia. The Ilergetes began to raid pro-Roman tribes, and Hasdrubal may have crossed the Ebro again in support, forcing Scipio to send punitive expeditions and restore peace. Roman prestige was established in Iberia, while the Carthaginians had suffered a significant blow. After punishing the officers in charge of the naval contingent for their lax discipline, and distributing the captured booty among his soldiers, Scipio and the Roman army wintered at Tarraco. Hasdrubal retired to Cartagena after garrisoning allied towns south of the Ebro.

If Hanno somehow had won the battle, it might have been possible for Hannibal to get reinforcements from Barcid Iberia as early as 217 BC. This battle brought the same results for Scipio in Iberia as the Battle of Trebia would bring for Hannibal in Italy: securing a base of operation, and winning over some of the native tribes as a source of provisions and recruits, and, most importantly, cutting off the overland communication of Hannibal from his base in Iberia. Unlike Hannibal, Scipio did not immediately launch a major campaign on enemy territory south of the river. Nor would he cut loose from his base like Hannibal did in the near future. Scipio took time to consolidate his holdings, subjugate or befriend Iberian tribes and raid Carthaginian territory. These activities laid the foundation for the future Roman operations in Iberia.

== Strategic importance ==
Hannibal had started his march in late May or early June, and after crossing the Ebro he fought the Iberian tribes in a campaign that cost him 22,000 soldiers, and was of little value to Carthage strategically, he failed to leave enough soldiers to defend the area before leaving Spain. The reason for this slow pace across Spain, almost three months from Cartagena to the Pyrenees could probably be that Hannibal first waited for news of Roman deployments, and then marched slowly so the Romans had time to invade Spain and meet defeat, and also to give the impression of a difficult march through Iberia to the Romans before he marched to Italy. (Note: Scipio Africanus, marching from the Ebro to Cartagena in 209 BC, took at best 20 days to cross the same distance, even after making camp each day and beaching his fleet for the night.) The Gallic rebellion delayed the arrival of Scipio by two to three months and foiled Hannibal's strategic goal of securing Spain, but even as Hannibal trimmed down his army by reducing its size and leaving his heavy baggage at Cissa to gain mobility and march towards the Rhône, he still expected to meet the Romans in Gaul, and kept the size of his army big enough to deal with the Romans. (Note: Hannibal's army numbered 59,000 soldiers when he crossed the Pyrenees, and at the Rhône he had 46,000 soldiers, giving him the option of fighting the Romans on even terms (Scipio and Sempronius commanded 48,000 infantry and 4,600 cavalry in their combined armies) if needed, and also march at the required pace to reach Alps in favorable conditions.)

Hannibal probably expected Scipio to go back to Italy with his army when he chose not to fight the Romans in Gaul. His choice not to fight Scipio near the Rhône enabled him to focus on reaching his primary strategic objective, reaching Italy by crossing the Alps, over his secondary goal, which was the security of Spain. Hannibal can be criticized for not securing Spain, which should have been his primary source of recruits, so he never received any reinforcements from Spain due to the activities of Scipio. However, had Hannibal secured Spain from invasion by defeating Scipio's army on the Rhône, but as a consequence had had to winter in Gaul due to a large number of wounded that would have slowed his movement and made the crossing Alps impossible, the Romans would have been able to amass overwhelming forces in the Po to oppose his advance and attack as his army emerged from the Alpine pass, exhausted and at its weakest; and furthermore, had Hannibal thus been stuck outside Italy as the Roman strategic plan required, Sempronius might have attacked Africa, triggering the recall of Hannibal and forcing him into a unwinnable war of attrition. When Alexander the Great invaded Persia, he left Antipater as his regent in Macedon, who kept the kingdom safe and sent reinforcements to Alexander as needed. Hannibal had to trust Hasdrubal Barca play a similar role, to keep Spain secure for Carthage, and to trust both Hasdrubal and Carthage to send reinforcements, yet despite never being reinforced from Spain and only once from Carthage, Hannibal still brought Rome to the brink of defeat. (Note: Some historians argue that if Hannibal had marched on Rome after the LakeTrasimene in 217 BC or Cannae in 216 BC he might have changed the course of the war, if not won it outright and Hannibal came very close to winning the war without attacking Rome, an opportunity he would not get even if he had won all the battles fought in Spain or Africa, and Carthage bound to eventually lose a war of attrition.)

Publius Scipio was tasked with holding Hannibal in Spain and Gaul, which was the essential prerequisite for implementation of the next step: invasion of Africa; Spain was a secondary objective. The Gallic rebellion in Cisalpine Gaul delayed Scipio's arrival to Spain, and probably saved his army from destruction, as Hannibal had mobilized 87,000 – 102,000 soldiers and had moved slowly through Spain to meet and beat the Romans before marching for Italy, whereas Scipio had 24,600 soldiers. The speed of Hannibal's march across Gaul scuttled the Roman plan: Hannibal had already crossed the Ebro before Scipio had even set sail, so that by the time the Romans arrived at the Rhône, Hannibal had already crossed the river, which Scipio discovered only by chance. Scipio now had no way to succeed in his primary objective of holding Hannibal out of Italy, but he could still go to Spain, the secondary objective.

Scipio's decision to send his brother to attack Spain mirrors the strategy Memnon of Rhodes had advocated against Alexander the Great to the Persians. Memnon suggested that the Persians attack Macedonia in conjunction with Sparta and Athens, with the help of the superior Persian fleet, while Alexander kept busy in Asia Minor through a "scorched earth" strategy. Due to the eventual success of the Scipio brothers in Spain, Hannibal looked for but never received reinforcements from Spain during the war, and one historian has speculated that if Publius Scipio had not sent his army to Spain in 218 BC, his son probably would not have won at Zama in 202 BC. On the other hand, Publius Scipio missed the chance to concentrate 40,000 infantry and 4,000 cavalry against Hannibal in the Po valley by not taking his army to Italy, and probably missed the chance to attack Hannibal as the Carthaginians emerged from the passes, exhausted and diminished in numbers as Scipio had originally planned. Had Scipio brought his army back to Italy, Rome would have had the option to launch the invasion of Africa by allowing Sempronius to set sail from Sicily, or order him to join Scipio, so Hannibal would have faced 60,000 Roman soldiers instead of 40,000 at the Battle of Trebbia, from this line of thought Scipio made a grave mistake by sending his army to Spain, which probably prolonged the war for another sixteen years.

== Sources and references ==
- Bagnall, Nigel (1990). The Punic Wars. Macmillan. ISBN 0-312-34214-4.
- Baker, G. P. (1999). Hannibal. Cooper Square Press. ISBN 0-8154-1005-0.
- Bath, Tony (1981). Hannibal's Campaigns. Barns & Nobles, New York. ISBN 0-88029-817-0.
- Cottrell, Leonard (1992). Hannibal: Enemy of Rome. Da Capo Press. ISBN 0-306-80498-0.
- Daly, Gregory (2002). Cannae: The Experience of Battle in the Second Punic War. London: Routledge. ISBN 978-0-415-26147-0.
- Delbruck, Hans (1 January 1990) [1975]. History of the Art of War Within the Frame Work of Political History. Vol. I. Warfare in Antiquity. U of Nebraska Press. ISBN 978-0-8032-9199-7.
- Dodge, Theodore A. (1994) [1891]. Hannibal. Da Capo Press. ISBN 0-306-81362-9.
- Eckstein, Arthur M. (1987). Senate and General. University of California Press. ISBN 0-520-05582-9.
- Fronda, Michael P. (2011). "Hannibal: Tactics, Strategy, and Geostrategy". In Hoyos, Dexter (ed.). A Companion to the Punic Wars. Oxford: Wiley-Blackwell. pp. 242–259. ISBN 978-1-405-17600-2.
- Gabriel, Richard A. (2008). Scipio Africanus. Potomac Books Inc. ISBN 978-1-59797-205-5.
- Gabriel, Richard A. (2011). Hannibal. Potomac Books Inc. ISBN 978-1-59797-686-2.
- Goldsworthy, Adrian (2003). The Fall of Carthage. Cassel Military Paperbacks. ISBN 0-304-36642-0.
- Hoyos, Dexter (2003). Hannibal's Dynasty: Power and Politics in the Western Mediterranean, 247–183 BC. New York: Routledge. ISBN 0-203-41782-8.
- Lancel, Serge (1998). Hannibal. Translated by Nevill, Antonia. Blackwell Publishers. ISBN 0-631-21848-3.
- Lancel, Serge (1999). Hannibal. Blackwell Publishers. ISBN 0-631-21848-3.
- Lazenby, John Francis (1978). Hannibal's War. Aris & Phillips. ISBN 0-85668-080-X.
- MacDougall, Patrick Leonard (2007). The Campaigns of Hannibal. Westholme Publishing. ISBN 978-1-59416-056-1.
- Miles, Richard (2011). Carthage Must Be Destroyed. Penguin Group. ISBN 978-0-141-01809-6.
- Peddie, John (2005). Hannibal's War. Sutton Publishing Limited. ISBN 0-7509-3797-1.
- Prevas, John (1998). Hannibal Crosses The Alps. Da Capo Press. ISBN 0-306-81070-0.
- Polybius (1889) [c. 146 BC]. The Histories, Book 1: The First Punic War. Translated by Shuckburgh, Evelyn S. London: Macmillan. chapter 37.
- Schuster, Carl Otis (2016). "Memnon and Mentor of Rhodes (ca. 380–333, ca. 385–340)". In Phang, Sara E.; Spence, Iain; Kelly, Douglas; Londey, Peter (eds.). Conflict in Ancient Greece and Rome: The Definitive Political, Social, and Military Encyclopedia. ABC-CLIO. ISBN 978-1610690201.
- Zimmerman, Klaus (2011). "Roman Strategy and Aims in the Second Punic War". In Hoyos, Dexter (ed.). A Companion to the Punic Wars. Oxford: Wiley-Blackwell. pp. 280–298. ISBN 978-1-405-17600-2.

=== Further reading ===
- Lancel, Serge (1997). Carthage A History. Blackwell Publishers. ISBN 1-57718-103-4.
- Livius, Titus (1972). The War With Hannibal. Penguin Books. ISBN 0-14-044145-X.
- Warry, John (1993). Warfare in the Classical World. Salamander Books Ltd. ISBN 1-56619-463-6.
