= Andosini =

Ancient people of the Pyrenees

The Andosini (Greek: Andosinoi, Ἀνδοσίνους) were an ancient people of the southern Pyrenees. They are known almost entirely from a single sentence of Polybius, who reports that Hannibal subdued them in 218 BC during his crossing from the Ebro to the mountains at the start of the Second Punic War.

== Name ==
There are named as Andosinoi (Ἀνδοσίνους) by Polybius, who lists them among the peoples subdued by Hannibal on the march to the Pyrenees. Livy, whose version of the same campaign is the other main account of the events, leaves them out and names the Ausetani and Lacetani in their place.

The name is most likely not Celtic. Its first element, Andos- (also Andoss-), is well attested in the Aquitanian personal names of the Comminges, among them Andossus, Andossic and Andosinus. Joaquín Gorrochategui compares the ethnonym Andosini with the Aquitanian personal name Andosinus, a derivative of Andoss-.

== Geography ==
The Andosini lived on the southern side of the Pyrenees. Christian Rico places them in the small valleys of the Valira, which drains into the Segre, in the area of present-day Andorra. Falileyev locates them more generally in the central Pyrenees, on the Spanish side. Their nearest neighbours were the Airenosi of the upper Segre to the south and the Cerretani of the Cerdanya to the east.

== History ==
In 218 BC, at the start of the Second Punic War, Hannibal led his army from New Carthage towards Italy. After crossing the Ebro he reduced the peoples between the river and the Pyrenees, listed by Polybius as the Ilergetes, the Bargusii, the Airenosi and the Andosini. The fighting was heavy: by Polybius's figures an army that set out with 90,000 foot and 12,000 horse had been reduced to 50,000 foot and 9,000 horse by the time it reached the passes.

The two main sources do not agree on this stretch of the march. Where Polybius has the Airenosi and Andosini, Livy names the Ausetani and Lacetani and says nothing of the two mountain peoples. The discrepancy is explained in different ways. Pere Bosch-Gimpera held that Livy had confused the Ausetani with the Andosini, while Francisco Beltrán Lloris argued that Livy had conflated two distinct episodes of the campaign. Rico instead proposes that Hannibal split his army, one column moving up the upper Segre past the Andosini while another took a more easterly route.
