= Contestani =

Ethnonym of Roman Spain

Unknown
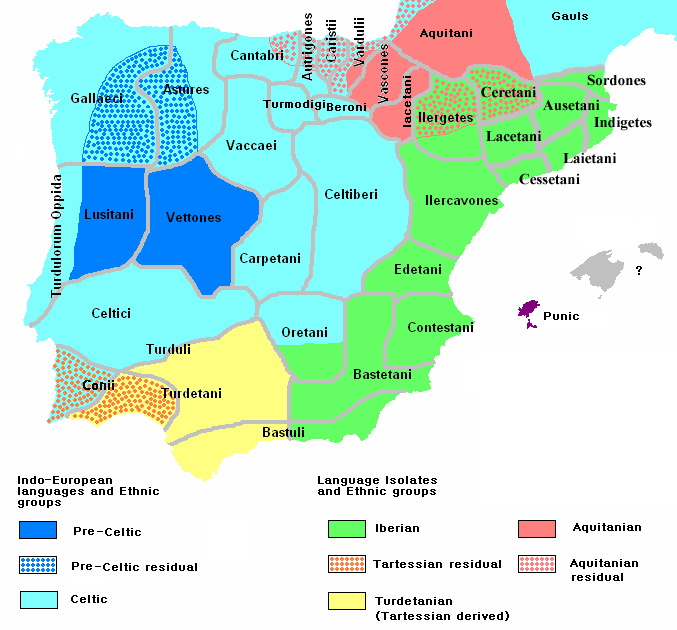
- Map of Iberian Peninsula after its occupation by Romans on the defeat of the Carthaginians, circa 200 BC.

Regions with significant populations
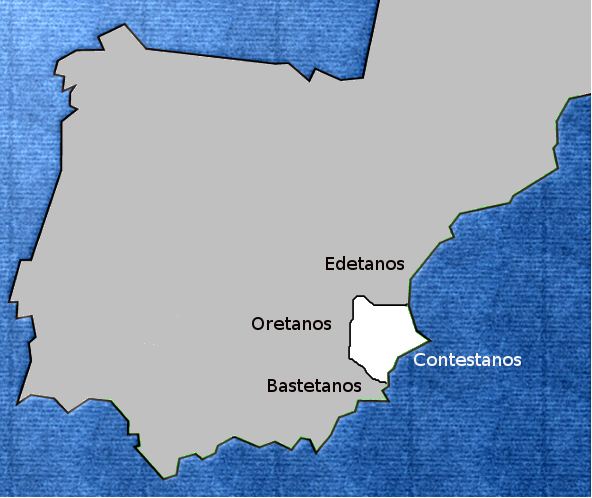
- A section of the Albacete Province, the eastern part of the Region of Murcia and the southern part of the Valencian Community.

Languages
- Iberian, Phoenician, Greek, Latin

Related ethnic groups
- Bastuli, Bastetani, Oretani, Edetani, Ilercavones, Cessetani, Laietani, Lacetani, Indigetes, Ausetani, Sordones

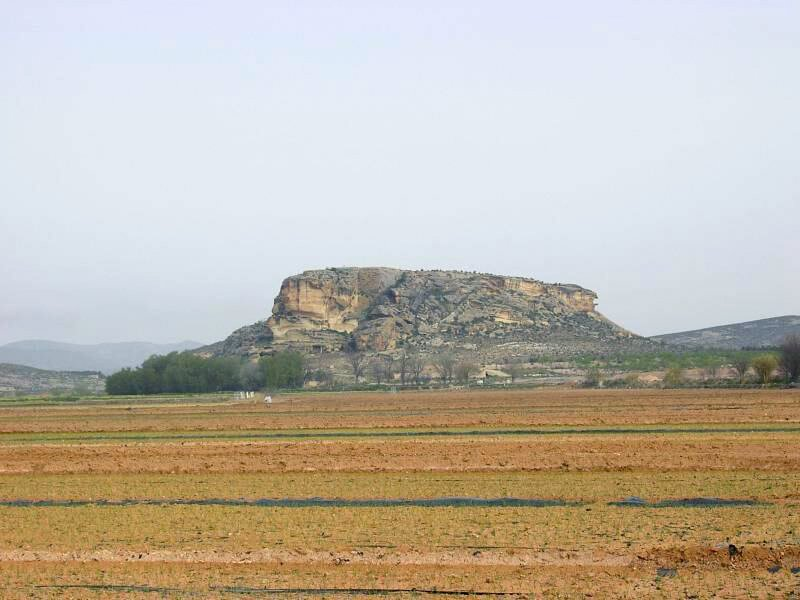
Eastern side of Tolmo de Minateda hill near Hellín

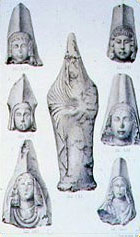
Sculptures found in the Cerro de los Santos ancient Iberian village

The Contestani were an ancient Iberian people who lived in Hispania before and after the Roman conquest. They are mentioned by Greek and Roman writers of the Imperial era, namely Pliny the Elder, Ptolemy, and Livy.

Modern scholars have debated whether the name "Contestani" was an indigenous term or an exonym created by the Romans. Enrique Llobregat, in his book Contestania Iberica, offers this summary of the issue:

We know nothing of the meaning of these geographical names that the Roman invader probably forged on indigenous gentiles. Recent research attempts to unravel the meaning of these terms, which often, as in the present case, have only very late literary documentation, at a time when the country was completely Romanized. ... but what is their significance? For the time being, it is unknown to us, ... There is only one way left open that allows us to identify these compartmentalizations in some way, ... a geographical analysis. ... In a word, to try to identify a homogeneous and reasonable territory that could serve as the basis for the concept of the ancient administrative division.

== Location ==
They lived in a region located in the southwest of Hispania Tarraconensis, east of the territory of the Bastetani, between the city of Urci, located NE of the Baetica and river Sucro, today known as Júcar. In modern times, this area corresponds to a section of the Albacete Province, the eastern part of the Region of Murcia and the southern part of the Valencian Community.

Cartago Nova was within its territory. Other important towns were Setabi (Xàtiva), Lucenti or Lucentum (La Albufereta in Alicante), Alonis (Villajoyosa), Ilici (Elche), Menlaria, Valentia and Iaspis.Iberian coins were minted at Setabi. Important Contestani archaeological sites include Tolmo de Minateda hill near Hellín and Bastida de les Alcusses, near Mogente.

== See also ==
- Iberians
- Pre-Roman peoples of the Iberian Peninsula
- Lucentum
- Lady of Elche
- Treasure of Villena
- Tolmo de Minateda
- La Bastida de les Alcusses

== Reference bibliography ==
- Abad Casal, Lorenzo (2005). "La Contestania Ibérica, treinta años después". In Abad, Lorenzo; Sala, Feliciana; Grau, Ignacio (eds.). La Contestania Ibérica, treinta años después (in Spanish). San Vicente: Universidad de Alicante, Servicio de Publicaciones. ISBN 84-7908-845-1.
- Curchin, Leonard (2009). "La toponimia antigua de Contestania y Edetania". Lucentum (in Spanish). 28.
- Ángel Montenegro et alii, Historia de España 2 - colonizaciones y formación de los pueblos prerromanos (1200-218 a.C), Editorial Gredos, Madrid (1989) ISBN 84-249-1386-8
