= Festinoval =

Music festival

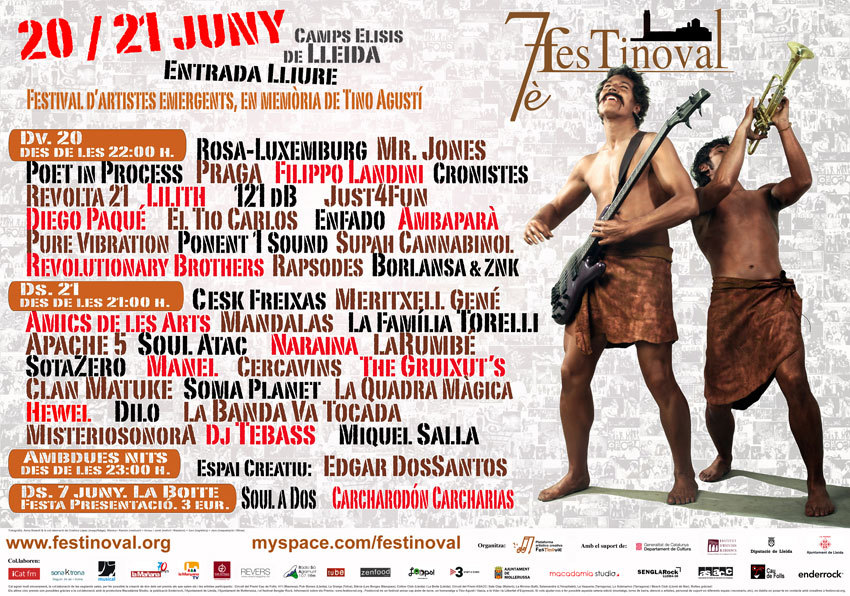
Poster for the 2008 edition of Festinoval.

Festinoval was a music festival in Lleida (Catalonia, Spain) generally focusing on local alternative bands. Since its first edition the festival has been held in the town's hill of Gardeny, part of the Mariola District, and recently in the park Camps Elisis, in Cappont. It was founded in June 2002 as a free, non profit foundation and a homage to local musician and activist Tino Agustí i Vaeza, who died in a car crash. However, the festival held its tenth and final edition in 2011. Posters for the festival typically included Ilergete chiefs Indíbil and Mandoni disguised as rock musicians.

== See also ==
- Senglar Rock
- Go Lleida
