= Levni =

Levni may refer to:

- Levni Yilmaz (born 1973), American independent animated film maker, artist and publisher
- Abdulcelil Levni (died 1732), Ottoman Turkish painter and miniaturist
- Leuni, an ancient Celtic tribe of Gallaecia
