= List of the Pre-Roman peoples of the Iberian Peninsula =

Ethnographic and Linguistic Map of the Iberian Peninsula at about 300 BCE.

This is a list of the pre-Roman people of the Iberian Peninsula (the Roman Hispania, i.e., modern Portugal, Spain and Andorra). Some closely fit the concept of a people, ethnic group or tribe. Others are confederations or even unions of tribes.

== Pre-Indo-European speakers ==
=== Aquitanians ===
- Airenosini/Arenosii
- Iacetani
- Vascones

=== Iberians ===
- Andosini - in the mountains of East Pyrenees southern slopes, in the high Segre river basin, area of modern Andorra.
- Ausetani - in the Osona region (old County of Osona), in the middle Ter river basin. Ausa (today's Vic) was their main centre.
- Bastetani/Bastuli - The biggest Iberian tribal confederation in area, they dwelt in a territory that included large areas of the mediterranean coast and the Sierra Nevada, in what are today parts of the modern provinces of Murcia, Albacete, Jaén, Almería, Granada and Málaga. Basti (today's Baza) was their main centre.
  - Mastieni - in and around Mastia territory (Cartagena).
- Bergistani/Bergusii - in the high Llobregat river basin, roughly in today's Barcelona province. Berga was their main centre. North of the Lacetani.
- Castellani - in the high Ter river basin, East Pyrenees southern slopes. North of the Ausetani.
- Cessetani - in the Tarraco region (roughly in today's central and east Tarragona province), in the mediterranean coastal region. Kese (Tarraco in Roman times, that would become the Hispania Tarraconensis capital), was their main centre.
- Ceretani/Cerretani - in Cerretana (today's Cerdanya/Cerdaña) and other East Pyrenees mountains southern slopes, also in the high Segre and Noguera rivers basins (tributaries of the Iberus - Ebro river), in the east part of Ribagorça. Libyca or Julia Libyca (today's Llivia) was their main centre. North of the Ilergetes and the Bergistani.
- Contestani - South of the Sucro (Xúquer) river and north of the Thader (Segura) river, in an area that today is roughly part of the Alicante/Alacant, Valencia, Murcia and Albacete provinces. A tribal confederation. East of the Bastetani.
  - Deitani - in and around Ilici territory (today's Elx/Elche)
- Edetani - North of the Sucro (Xúquer/Júcar) river and south of the Millars river, roughly in today's Valencia province. One of the biggest iberian tribes or tribal confederations. Edeta (Roman times Lauro, today's Lliria), to the northwest of Valencia, was their main centre, Arse (Saguntum in Roman times, today's Sagunto/Sagunt) was also in their territory. North of the Contestani and the Bastetani and south of the Ilercavones.
- Elisyces - a tribe that dwelt in the region of Narbo (Narbonne) and modern northern Roussillon. May have been either Iberian or Ligurian or a Ligurian-Iberian tribe.
- Ilercavones - in the low Iberus (Ebro) river basin to the Millars river along the mediterranean coast and to the inland towards the Sierra de Gúdar, in Ilercavonia. One of the biggest iberian tribes or tribal confederations. Hibera (Roman time Dertusa or Dertosa, modern time Tortosa) was their main centre. North of the Edetani, south of the Ilergetes, east of the Sedetani and west of the Cessetani.
- Ilergetes/Ilergetae - in the plains area of the middle and low Segre and Cinca rivers towards the Iberus (Ebro) river margins. One of the biggest Iberian tribes or tribal confederations. Iltrida (Ilerda in Roman times, today's Lérida/Lleida) was their main centre.
- Indigetes/Indigetae - in the low Ter river basin, East Pyrenees southern slopes, they occupied the far north east area of the Iberian Peninsula known as Hispania Tarraconensis, in the gulf of Empodrae (Empúries) and Rhoda (Roses), stretching up into the Pyrenees though the regions of Empordà, Selva and perhaps as far as Gironès, in what is roughly today's Girona Province. Indika/Indiga or Undika was their main centre. A tribal confederation: they were formed by four tribes.
- Lacetani - in the middle Llobregat river basin and surrounding hills. Northwest of the Laietani.
- Laietani - in the low Llobregat river basin, along a part of the Mediterranean coast roughly in what is today a part of the Barcelona province and Barcelona city. Laieta (Barcino in Roman times and Barcelona in modern times) was their main centre.
- Oretani? - In the high Baetis (Guadalquivir) river valley, eastern Marianus Mons (Sierra Morena) and southern area of today's La Mancha. They could have been an Iberian tribe, a Celtic one, or a mixed Celtic and Iberian tribe or tribal confederacy (and hence related to the Celtiberians). The Mantesani/Mentesani/Mantasani of today's La Mancha and the Germani (of Oretania) in eastern Marianus Mons (Sierra Morena) and west Jabalón river valley, sometimes are included in the Oretani but it is not certain if they were Oretani tribes.
- Sedetani - south of the Iberus (Ebro) river and west of the Guadalope river, roughly in the middle basin of the Iberus (Ebro). Salduie (Roman time Salduba and Caesaraugusta and modern time Zaragoza) was in their territory and they were possibly closely related to the Edetani. West of the Ilercavones.
- Sordones - in the Roussillon territory (Pyrénées Orientales Department, France), Ruscino (today's Château-Roussillon near Perpignan) was their main centre.
- Vescetani/Oscenses - In today's northern Aragon, east of Gállego river, in Sobrarbe, in and around Bolskan, later Osca (Huesca), and high Cinca River valley, Spain. They could also be related to the Vascones and therefore be related to the Aquitani speaking the Aquitanian language, or a mixed Iberian-Aquitanian tribe or tribal confederacy.
- Unknown named tribe or tribes in the Balearic Islands (formed by the Pityusic Islands and Gymnesian islands), may have been Iberians.

== Indo-European speakers ==
- Proto-Indo-Europeans

=== Celts ===
- Hispano-Celts/Celts of Hispania - They lived in large parts of the Iberian Peninsula, in the Northern, Central and Western regions (more than half of the peninsula's territory).
  - Celtiberians (Eastern Hispano-Celts/Celts of Eastern Hispania) – Eastern Iberian meseta (Spain), mountains of the headwaters of the rivers Douro, Tagus, Guadiana (Anas), Júcar, Jalón (river), Jiloca (river) and Turia (river), (tribal confederation). Mixed Celtic and Iberian tribes or Celtic tribes influenced by Iberians. Not synonymous of all the Celts that lived in the Iberian Peninsula but to a narrower group, the majority of Celtic tribes in the Iberian Peninsula were not Celtiberians. They spoke Celtiberian (a Continental Celtic language of the Q Celtic type).
    - Arevaci
    - Belli
    - Cratistii
    - Lobetani
    - Lusones – Western Zaragoza (province), Eastern Guadalajara (Spain).
    - Olcades
    - Pellendones/Cerindones, in high Duero river course (Numantia) and neighbouring mountains, might also have been related to the Pelendi/Belendi that dwelt in the middle Sigmatis river, today's Leyre (river).
    - Titii (Celtiberian)
    - Turboletae/Turboleti
    - Uraci/Duraci
    - Oretani? – northeastern Andalusia, northwest Murcia and southern fringes of La Mancha, (Spain), mountains of the headwaters of the Guadalquivir (ancient Baetis river); Some consider them not Celtic Ethnographic Map of Pre-Roman Iberia (circa 200 b.
  - Western Hispano-Celts/Celts of Western Hispania - They spoke Gallaecian (a Continental Celtic language of the Q Celtic type).
    - Allotriges/Autrigones – East Burgos (Spain), Northwestern La Rioja (Spain) to the Atlantic Coast.
    - Astures — Asturias and northern León (Spain), and east of Trás os Montes (Portugal), (tribal confederation).
      - Cismontani
        - Amaci
        - Cabruagenigi
        - Gigurri
        - Lancienses
        - Lougei
        - Orniaci
        - Superatii
        - Susarri/Astures Proper
        - Tiburi
        - Zoelae – Eastern Trás-os-Montes (Portugal), (Miranda do Douro).
      - Transmontani
        - Baedunienses
        - Brigaentini
        - Cabarci
        - Iburri
        - Luggones/Lungones
        - Paenii
        - Paesici
        - Saelini
        - Vinciani
        - Viromenici
    - Bebryaces/Berybraces – unknown location, may have been related to the Bebryces (gauls) or the Berones, there is also the possibility that it was an old name of the Celtiberians.
    - Berones – La Rioja (Spain).
    - Cantabri – Cantabria, part of Asturias and part of Castile-Leon (Spain); some consider them not Celtic, but rather pre-Celtic Indo-European as could have been the Lusitani and Vettones Ethnographic Map of Pre-Roman Iberia (circa 200 b, If their language was not Celtic it might have been Para-Celtic like Ligurian (i.e. an Indo-European language branch not Celtic but more closely related to Celtic). (tribal confederation).
      - Avarigines
      - Blendii/Plentusii/Plentuisii
      - Camarici/Tamarici
      - Concani
      - Coniaci/Conisci
      - Moroecani
      - Noegi
      - Orgenomesci
      - Salaeni/Selaeni
      - Vadinienses
      - Vellici/Velliques
    - Caristii/Carietes – today's west Basque Country, they might have been Celtic (see Late Basquisation), they were later assimilated by the Vascones in the 6th and 7th centuries; some consider them not Celtic, possibly a pre-Celtic Indo-European people as the Lusitani and Vettones could have been. Ethnographic Map of Pre-Roman Iberia (circa 200 b. If their language was not Celtic it might have been Para-Celtic like Ligurian (i.e. an Indo-European language branch not Celtic but more closely related to Celtic).
    - Carpetani – Central Iberian meseta (Spain), in the geographical centre of the Iberian Peninsula, in a large part of today's Castilla-La Mancha and Madrid regions. A tribal confederation with 27 identified tribes.
      - Aelariques -
      - Aeturiques -
      - Arquioci - in Iplacea, Roman named Complutum (today's Alcalá de Henares) region.
      - Acualiques -
      - Bocouriques -
      - Canbarici - in Toletum (Toledo) region.
      - Contucianci - in Segobriga region.
      - Dagencii -
      - Doviliques -
      - Duitiques -
      - Duniques -
      - Elguismiques -
      - Langioci -
      - Longeidoci -
      - Maganiques -
      - Malugeniques -
      - Manuciques -
      - Maureici -
      - Mesici -
      - Metturici -
      - Moenicci -
      - Obisodiques - in Toletum (Toledo) region
      - Pilonicori -
      - Solici -
      - Tirtaliques - in Segobriga region.
      - Uloques -
      - Venatioques -
    - Celtici – Portugal south of the Tagus River and north of Guadiana River (Anas), Alentejo and Algarve (Portugal), western Extremadura (Spain), (tribal confederation).
      - Cempsi
      - Conii – according to some scholars, Conii and Cynetes were two different peoples or tribes and the names were not two different names of the same people or tribe; in this case, the Conii possibly dwelt along the northern banks of the middle Anas (Guadiana) river, in today's western Extremadura region of Spain, and were a Celtici tribe wrongly confused with the Cynetes of Cyneticum (Algarve) that dwelt from the west banks of the Low Anas (Guadiana) river further to the south (the celticization of the Cynetes by the Celtici confused the distinction between the two peoples or tribes).
      - Mirobrigenses
      - Sefes/Saefes
    - Celtici of Arunda (Ronda) – southernmost Celtic tribe, in south Turdetania, later Baetica Roman province, (in today's western Málaga Province), Andalucia region.
    - Cynetes – Cyneticum (today's Algarve region) and Low Alentejo (Portugal); originally probably Tartessians or similar, later celtized by the Celtici; according to some scholars, Cynetes and Conii were two different peoples or tribes Ethnographic Map of Pre-Roman Iberia (circa 200 b.
    - Gallaecians or Callaici – Gallaecia (Spain & Portugal), (tribal confederation).
      - Addovi/Iadovi
      - Aebocosi
      - Albiones/Albioni – western Asturias (Spain).
      - Amphiloci
      - Aobrigenses
      - Arroni/Arrotrebi
      - Arrotrebae/Artabri – Northern Galicia (Spain).
      - Aunonenses
      - Baedi
      - Banienses – around Baião Municipality, Eastern Porto District, (Portugal).
      - Biballi
      - Bracari/Callaeci/Gallaeci Proper – Southeastern Braga District, Braga, Western Porto District, Porto, (Portugal).
      - Brigantes (Callaici tribe) – Northern Bragança District, Bragança, (Portugal).
      - Caladuni
      - Capori
      - Celtici Praestamarici
      - Celtici Supertamarici
      - Cibarci
      - Cileni
      - Coelerni/Aquaflavienses – Braga District, Vila Real District (Chaves), (Portugal) and Ourense (Spain).
      - Egi
      - Egovarri
      - Equaesi – Minho and Trás-os-Montes (Portugal).
      - Grovii – Minho (Portugal) and Galicia (Spain).
      - Iadones
      - Interamici/Interamnici – Trás-os-Montes (Portugal).
      - Lapatianci
      - Lemavi
      - Leuni – Minho (Portugal).
      - Limici – Lima River banks, Minho (Portugal) and Galicia (Spain).
      - Louguei
      - Luanqui – Trás-os-Montes (Portugal).
      - Naebisoci/Aebisoci
      - Namarii
      - Namarini
      - Narbasi – Minho (Portugal) and Galicia (Spain).
      - Nemetati – Minho (Portugal).
      - Nerii
      - Poemani
      - Quaquerni/Querquerni – Minho (Portugal).
      - Seurbi – Minho (Portugal).
      - Seurri – Sarria Municipality, East Central Galicia (Spain)
      - Tamagani – Chaves (Portugal).
      - Turodi – Trás-os-Montes (Portugal) and Galicia (Spain).
      - Varri
    - Mantesani/Mentesani/Mantasani – La Mancha Plateau, Castilla-La Mancha (Spain); were a different people from the Oretani.
    - Plentauri – Northwestern La Rioja (Spain).
    - Turduli – Guadiana valley (Portugal) and Extremadura (Spain); might have been related to Lusitanians, Callaeci or Turdetani.
      - Turduli Baetici- Baeturia/Baeturia Turdulorum, south of the Anas (Guadiana) river and northern slope of Marianus Mons (Sierra Morena), Southern Extremadura region, Badajoz Province, Portugal Southeastern corner, Beja District.
      - Turduli Bardili – Setubal Peninsula (Portugal); might have been related to Lusitanians, Callaeci or Turdetani.
      - Turduli Oppidani – Estremadura (Portugal)-Beira Litoral coastline; might have been related to Lusitanians, Callaeci or Turdetani.
      - Turduli Veteres – Southern Douro banks, between Douro and Vouga River, Aveiro District, (Portugal); might have been related to Lusitanians, Callaeci or Turdetani.
    - Turmodigi or Turmogi – Central Burgos.
    - Vaccaei – North Central Iberian meseta (Spain), middle Duero river basin. A tribal confederation. Ptolemy mentions 20 vaccaean Civitates (that also had the meaning of tribes).
      - Cauci (Vaccaei) – in Cauca (Coca, Segovia)
    - Varduli – today's East Basque Country, they might have been Celtic (see Late Basquisation), they were later assimilated by the Vascones in the 6th and 7th centuries; Some consider them not Celtic, possibly a pre-Celtic Indo-European people as the Lusitani and Vettones could have been. If their language was not Celtic it might have been Para-Celtic like Ligurian (i.e. an Indo-European language branch not Celtic but more closely related to Celtic). Ethnographic Map of Pre-Roman Iberia (circa 200 b.
- Belgae?
  - Suessetani - Far North Western Aragon and Far South Eastern Navarra (Spain), between the Gallicus (Gállego) and Low Aragon rivers and between the Ebro river and Sierra de Santo Domingo Mountains. Alba (Arba) river basin (a tributary of the Ebro) was in the centre of their territory that also included the Bardenas Reales. Corbio was their capital. They were North of the Celtiberians, South of the Iacetani and the Vascones, West of the Galli (tribe). They were later conquered by the Vascones in the 2nd century BC. that were allies of the Romans. Could have been related to the Suessiones (a tribe of the Belgae).
- Eastern Celts - They spoke Eastern Celtic or Noric (a Continental Celtic language).
  - Volcae - an Eastern Celtic people that came from today's Moravia, central part of the Hercynian Forest (Hercynia Silva)
    - Volciani – might have been a tribe related to the Volcae and not to the Hispano-Celts/Iberian Celts (i.e. the Celts of the Iberian Peninsula). They have been located north of the Iberus (Ebro) river but not very precisely.
- Gauls (Galli) – Some Gaulish tribes might have migrated southwards and crossed the Pyrenees (by the north, the central or the south areas of the mountains) in a second or a third Celtic wave to the Iberian Peninsula. These tribes were different from the Hispano-Celtic/Iberian Celtic tribes.
  - Galli (tribe) – along Gallicus (Gállego) river banks, see place names (toponyms) like Forum Gallorum, Gallur, a different tribe from the Suessetani; might have been a tribe related to the Galli (Gauls) and not to the Hispano-Celts/Iberian Celts.

=== Celts? Para-Celts, Pre-Celtic Indo-Europeans? ===
==== Lusitanians-Vettones ====
- Lusitanians (Lusitani/Bellitani) – Portugal south of the Douro River and north of Tagus River, and northwestern Extremadura (Spain). They spoke Lusitanian that is a clearly Indo-European language but the filiation as a Celtic language is not surely proven (although many tribal names and place names, toponyms, are Celtic). Attempts to classify the language have also pointed at an Italic origin. Hence Lusitanian language may have been a Para-Celtic Indo-European branch like Ligurian (i.e. an Indo-European language branch not Celtic but more closely related to Celtic). The Lusitanians have also been identified as being a pre-Celtic Indo-European speaking culture of the Iberian Peninsula closely related to the neighbouring Vettones tribal confederation. However, under their controversial theory of Celtic originating in Iberia, John T Koch and Barry Cunliffe have proposed a para-Celtic identity for the Lusitanian language and culture or that they spoke an archaic Proto-Celtic language and were Proto-Celtic in ethnicity.
  - Arabrigenses
  - Aravi
  - Coelarni/Colarni
  - Interamnienses
  - Lancienses
    - Lancienses Oppidani
    - Lancienses Transcudani
    - Ocelenses Lancienses
  - Meidubrigenses
  - Paesuri – Douro and Vouga (Portugal).
  - Palanti (according to some scholars, these tribes were Lusitanians and not Vettones)
    - Calontienses
    - Caluri
    - Coerenses
  - Tangi
    - Elbocori
    - Igaeditani
    - Tapori/Tapoli – River Tagus, around the border area of Portugal and Spain.
  - Talures
  - Veaminicori
- Vettones – Ávila, Salamanca (Spain), and most of Cáceres (Spain) possibly a pre-Celtic Indo-European people, closely related to the Lusitani. If their language was not Celtic it might have been Para-Celtic like Ligurian (i.e. an Indo-European language branch not Celtic but more closely related to Celtic). A tribal confederation.
  - Bletonesii – Bletisama (today's Ledesma) was their main centre, Salamanca Province, Spain.
  - Calontienses? (according to some scholars, these tribes were Lusitanians and not Vettones)
  - Caluri?
  - Coerenses?

==== Turdetanians ====
- Turdetani – Today's Western Andalucia (Hispania Baetica), Baetis (Guadalquivir) River valley and basin, and Marianus Mons (Sierra Morena). Some consider them Celtic, or possibly a pre-Celtic Indo-European people as with the Lusitani and Vettones. If their language was not Celtic it might have been Para-Celtic like Ligurian (i.e. an Indo-European language branch not Celtic but most closely related to it). They might otherwise have been a non-Indo-European people related to the Iberians or Tartessians.
  - Cilbiceni – approximately in today's Cádiz Province
  - Elbisini/Eloesti/Olbisini – in today's Huelva Province
  - Etmanei – in the middle area of Baetis river (Guadalquivir) course and surrounding region, approximately in today's Córdoba Province
  - Gletes/Galetes/Ileates – in Marianus Mons (Sierra Morena), approximately in today's northern areas of the provinces of Huelva, Seville and Córdoba
  - Turdetani/Tartessii Proper – in the low course of Baetis river (Guadalquivir) and surrounding region, approximately in today's Seville Province

=== Germanic peoples ===
- Germani (Oretania)

== See also ==
- Greco-Iberian alphabet
- List of Celtic tribes
- Hispano-Celtic languages
- Celticization
- Late Basquisation
- Iberian languages
- Paleohispanic languages
- Paleohispanic scripts
- Prehistoric Iberia
- Iberian sculpture
- Gallaecia
- History of Portugal
  - Timeline of Portuguese history
- History of Spain
- Hispania
- Lusitania

== Bibliography ==
- Alberro, Manuel and Arnold, Bettina (eds.), e-Keltoi: Journal of Interdisciplinary Celtic Studies, Volume 6: The Celts in the Iberian Peninsula, University of Wisconsin - Milwaukee, Center for Celtic Studies, 2005.
- Guerra, Amilcar. (2005). Povos, cultura e língua no Ocidente Peninsular: uma perspectiva, a partir da toponomástica. Palaeohispánica: Revista sobre lenguas y culturas de la Hispania antigua, ISSN 1578-5386, Nº. 5, 2005 (Ejemplar dedicado a: Actas del IX coloquio sobre lenguas y culturas paleohispánicas (Barcelona, 20-24 de octubre de 2004)), pp. 793–822.
- Haywood, John. (2001). Atlas of the Celtic World. London: Thames & Hudson. ISBN 0500051097 ISBN 978-0500051092
- Kruta, Venceslas. (2000). Les Celtes, Histoire et Dictionnaire. Paris: Éditions Robert Laffont, coll. « Bouquins ». ISBN 2-7028-6261-6.
- Luján Martinez, Eugenio R. (2006) "The Language(s) of the Callaeci," e-Keltoi: Journal of Interdisciplinary Celtic Studies: Vol. 6, Article 16. pp. 715–748. Available at: The Language(s) of the Callaeci
