= Namarini =

Ancient Celtic people of the Iberian Peninsula

The Namarini were an ancient Gallaecian Celtic tribe, living in the north of modern Galicia, in the Foz's county.

== See also ==
- Pre-Roman peoples of the Iberian Peninsula
