= Castellani people =

Ancient people of the Iberian peninsula

The Iberian Peninsula in the 3rd century BC

The Castellani or 'Castelani' (Greek: Καστελλανοί, Kastellanoi) were an ancient Iberian or Pre-Roman people of the Iberian Peninsula. They inhabited the bottom of the eastern Pyrenees in the northern Tarraconense.

The Castellani are one of the groups mentioned by Claudius Ptolemy in his Geographia, book 2, chapter 5. Their main settlements were:

- Sebendunum (Σεβένδοννον), modern day Besalú
- Beseda (Βέσηδα), Sant Joan de les Abadesses
- Egosa (Ἐγῶσα)
- Basi (Βάσι)

== See also ==
- Iberians
- Pre-Roman peoples of the Iberian Peninsula

== Bibliography ==
- Ángel Montenegro et alii, Historia de España 2 - colonizaciones y formación de los pueblos prerromanos (1200-218 a.C), Editorial Gredos, Madrid (1989) ISBN 84-249-1386-8
