= Ceretani =

Ancient people of the Iberian peninsula

The Iberian Peninsula in the 3rd century BC

The Cerretani or Ceretani were an ancient pre-Roman people of the Iberian Peninsula who occupied what became the modern-day Cerdanya, in the valley Segre and part of Aragon. Their neighbours from the east were Ausetani and from the south Ilergetes. Their capital was Julia Libyca, modern Llívia. They are noted in Greek and Roman geographical treatises.

== Bibliography ==
- Ángel Montenegro et alii, Historia de España 2 - colonizaciones y formación de los pueblos prerromanos (1200-218 a.C), Editorial Gredos, Madrid (1989) ISBN 84-249-1386-8
