= Celtici =

Celtic tribe or group of tribes of the Iberian Peninsula

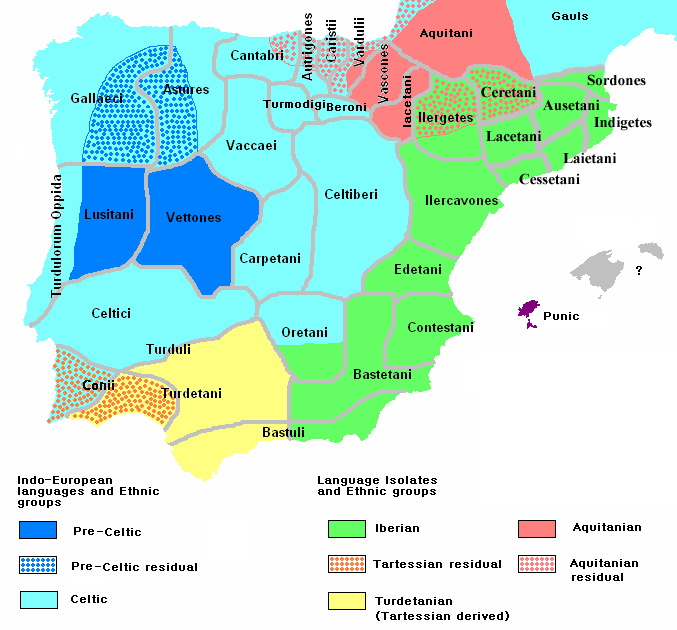
Iberian Peninsula at about 200 BC

The Celtici (in Portuguese, Spanish, and Galician languages, Célticos) were a Celtic tribe or group of tribes of the Iberian Peninsula, inhabiting three definite areas: in what today are the regions of Alentejo and the Algarve in Portugal; in the Province of Badajoz and north of Province of Huelva in Spain, in the ancient Baeturia; and along the coastal areas of Galicia. Classical authors give various accounts of the Celtici's relationships with the Gallaeci, Celtiberians and Turdetani.

== Classical sources ==
Map of the main pre-Roman tribes in Portugal and their migrations. Turduli movement in red, Celtici in brown and Lusitanian in blue.

Several classical sources, Greek and Roman, mentioned the Celtici.

Strabo (3, 1, 6) echoed Poseidonius when he mentioned the Keltikoi as the main inhabitants of the region located between the rivers Tagus and Guadiana, approximately where the Alentejo (Portugal) stands today.

The Celtici were not considered a barbarian people. On the contrary, they were what the Greeks considered a civilized people, almost in the same degree as the Turdetani.

They shared the same 'gentle and civilized' character of the Turdetani. Strabo put this down to the fact that they were neighbouring populations, and Polybius proposed that they were related, 'although the Celtici are less [civilized] because they generally live in hamlets (Str., 3, 2, 15)'.

Their main cities were Lacobriga (probably Lagos in the Algarve), Caepiana (in Alentejo), Braetolaeum, Miróbriga (near Santiago do Cacém), Arcobriga, Meribriga, Catraleucus, Turres, Albae and Arandis (near Castro Verde and Ourique). Other important cities were Nertobriga, Turobriga, Segida, Ebora, Caetobriga and Eburobrittium (Óbidos), among other settlements.

Their most famous city was Conistorgis (Str., 3, 2, 2), which, according to different sources, belonged to the Cunetes or Conii (App., Iber. 56-60). Similarly, Strabo (3, 2, 15) indicated that the Celtici established colonies, such as Pax Julia (Beja).

The origin of the Baeturian Celts was, according to Pliny, from the Celtici of Lusitania and were also kin to the Gallaeci:

Latin: Celticos a Celtiberis ex Lusitania advenisse manifestum est sacris, lingua, oppidorum vocabulis, quae cognominibus in Baetica distinguntur.

The Celtici from Guadiana had blood links with the Galician Celts, since there had been large-scale migration to the northwest of these Celts along with the Turduli (Str., 3, 3, 5).
...[Pliny considers the Celtici who extend into Baetica] to have migrated from Lusitania which he appears to regard as the original seat of the whole Celtic population of the Iberian peninsula including the Celtiberians, on the ground of an identity of sacred rites, language, and names of cities.

These migratory patterns have persisted on the same axis until modern times, supporting a centuries-old traditional and seasonal farming and animal husbandry transhumance along the ancient Roman or Carthaginian Silver road that served for its rich mines production transport, and for the Astorga region peddlers and wagoneers, the Maragatos.

Pliny also noted that already in Roman times the inhabitants of Miróbriga (one of the Celtic cities of the region, near Santiago do Cacém) used the surname of Celtici: "Mirobrigenses qui Celtici cognominantur". In the sanctuary of Miróbriga a resident leaves their Celtic origin recorded:

D(IS) M(ANIBUS) S(ACRUM) / C(AIUS) PORCIUS SEVE/RUS MIROBRIGEN(SIS) / CELT(ICUS) ANN(ORUM) LX / H(IC) S(ITUS) E(ST) S(IT) T(IBI) T(ERRA) L(EVIS)

== Origins ==
Traditional theories hold that the Celtici were a group that included several populi, namely the Saefes and the Cempsii, of unknown origin, which according to modern research possibly belonged to one of the first settlements of Celtic origin; and initially perhaps also the possible proto-Lusitanians (the Ligus, Lusis or Lycis), all mentioned in the Ora Maritima ("Sea Coasts") of Avienius, and possibly reinforced with subsequent waves.

== The Celtici of Alentejo and Baeturia ==
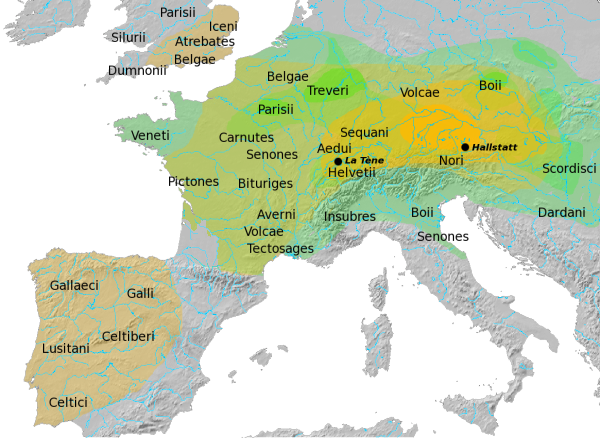
Celtic expansions in western Europe (Celtici - south Portugal and south-western Spain).

The main Eburones' cities were their presumed capital Ebora (Évora), Segovia (archeological site near Campo Maior, Elvas), the coastal town of Mirobriga Celticorum (archeological site near Santiago do Cacém), and five other towns within Alentejo. Around the 3rd Century BC they managed to push southwards towards the western Algarve coast where they founded the port of Laccobriga (Monte Molião, near Lagos) in Conii territory. In Baeturia, the Bituriges set their capital at Nertobriga (Cerro del Coto, Fregenal de la Sierra – Badajoz) whilst the Turones placed theirs at Turobriga (Llanos de La Belleza, near Aroche – Huelva) and both peoples controlled six other cities.

== The Celtici of Ultima Celtiberia ==
In Baetica the Celtici held or had a presence in some city-states, namely Celti (Peñaflor – Seville), Urso (Osuna – Seville), Obulco/Obulcula (Castillo de la Monclova, Fuentes de Andalucía – Seville; Iberian-type mint: Ipolca), Tribola (Baena – Córdoba), Munda (Montilla? – Córdoba), Tucci/Itucci (Los Martos, near Jaén – Córdoba), Turobriga (Turón – Granada), Cartima (Cártama – Málaga), Arunda (Ronda – Málaga) and Acinipo (Ronda la Vieja – Málaga).

== The Celtici of Gallaecia ==
Further North in Gallaecia, another group of Celtici dwelt the coastal areas. They comprised several populi, including the Celtici proper: the Praestamarci south of the Tambre river (Tamaris), the Supertamarci north of it, and the Neri by the Celtic promontory (Promunturium Celticum), whom Strabo considered related to the Celtici of Lusitania, settled in Gallaecia after a military campaign held jointly with the Turduli Veteres. Pomponius Mela affirmed that all the inhabitants of the coastal regions, from the bays of southern Gallaecia and up to the Astures, were also Celtici: "All (this coast) is inhabited by the Celtici, except from the Douro river to the bays, where the Grovi dwelt (…) In the north coast first there are the Artabri, still of the Celtic people (Celticae gentis), and after them the Astures." He also mentioned the fabulous isles of tin, the Cassiterides, as situated among these Celtici.

The Celtici Supertarmarci have also left a number of inscriptions, as the Celtici Flavienses did. Several villages and rural parishes still bear the name Céltigos (from Latin Celticos) in Galicia. This is also the name of an archpriesthood of the Catholic Church, a division of the archbishopric of Santiago de Compostela, encompassing part of the lands attributed to the Celtici Supertamarci by ancient authors.

== Culture ==
Archaeology confirms that the material culture of the southwestern Celtici was deeply influenced by the Arevaci of Celtiberia and beyond, as their metalwork shows strong parallels with south-central Gaul, Liguria, Etruria, and central Italy. The Baetic Celtici soon fell under the cultural influence of their Iberian Turdetani neighbors, as well as receiving Hellenistic elements from the Carthaginians.

== History ==
Submitted to Carthaginian rule just prior to the Second Punic War, the Celtici of Alentejo and Beturia recovered their independence in 206 BC whereas their Baetic counterparts simply shifted their allegiance from Carthage to the Roman Republic. In 197 BC the Ultima Celtiberia was included in the new Hispania Ulterior Province, though they were only conquered by the Ulterior Praetor Tiberius Gracchus in 179 BC.

The Beturian Celtici tribes however, rose in support of a Turdetanian rebellion soon afterwards, and allied with the Lusitani and Vettones, promptly began to raid the lands of the Roman Hispanic allies in Baetica and the Cyneticum throughout the 2nd Century BC. They proved to be the most reliable allies of the Lusitani – whose chieftain Viriathus used western Beturia as a rear base for its military operations on the south – in deep contrast to the Celtici city-states of Baetica, who frequently changed sides according to circumstances.

When the tide turned against the Lusitani in 141 BC, the Beturian Celtici were subjected to the punitive campaigns conducted in the Iberian southwest by Consul Quintus Fabius Maximus Servilianus, who invaded eastern Beturia and plundered five towns allied with Viriathus. The Celtici were later defeated and included in H. Ulterior by the Proconsul Publius Licinius Crassus in the wake of his campaign against them and their Lusitani neighbors in 93 BC.

== See also ==
- Belgae
- Gauls
- History of Portugal
  - Timeline of Portuguese history
- History of Spain
- Prehistoric Iberia
- Pre-Roman peoples of the Iberian Peninsula
- Names of the Celts
- List of Celtic place names in Portugal
- "Tartessian" or Southwestern language ("South-Lusitanian" language)
