= Capori =

Ancient Gallaecian Celtic tribe

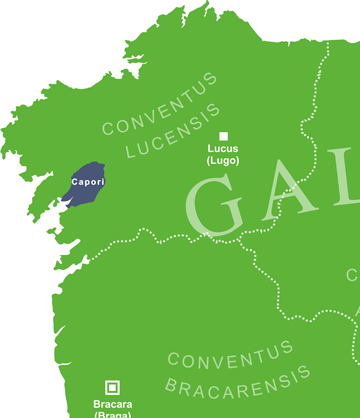
Map of Gallaecia

The Capori were an ancient Gallaecian Celtic tribe, living in the west of modern Galicia, in the Padrón's county.

== See also ==
- Pre-Roman peoples of the Iberian Peninsula
