= Cileni =

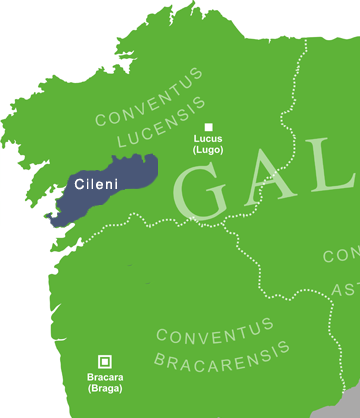
Map showing approximate area of Cileni Tribe

The Celeni or Cileni were an ancient Gallaecian Celtic tribe, living in the west of modern Galicia, as a civitas in the Caldas de Reis's county, with capital Aquae Celenae, which under Roman rule became a diocese and was part of the Conventus Lucensis (capital now Lugo).

== See also ==
- Pre-Roman peoples of the Iberian Peninsula
