= Baedi =

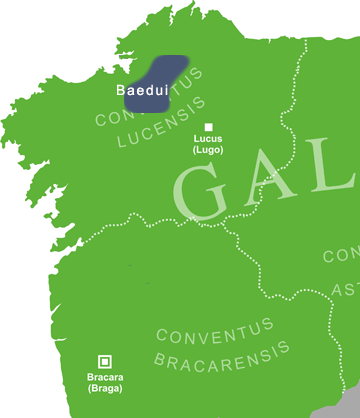
Map of Gallaecia

The Baedi were an ancient Gallaecian Celtic tribe, living in the north of modern Galicia, in the Betanzos's county.

== See also ==
- Pre-Roman peoples of the Iberian Peninsula
