= Louguei =

The Lougei or Louguei were an ancient Gallaecian Celtic tribe, living in the east of modern Galicia, in the Ancares's county.

== See also ==
- Pre-Roman peoples of the Iberian Peninsula
