= Poemani =

The Poemani were an ancient Gallaecian Celtic tribe, living in the center-north of modern Galicia, in the Terra Chá's county.

== See also ==
- Pre-Roman peoples of the Iberian Peninsula
