= Tapoli =

Ancient Celtic tribe of Lusitania

The Iberian Peninsula in the 3rd century BC.

The Tapoli or Tapori were an ancient Celtic tribe of Lusitania, akin to the Lusitanians, to whom they were a dependent tribe, living just north of the river Tagus, around the border area of modern-day Portugal and Spain.

== See also ==
- Pre-Roman peoples of the Iberian Peninsula
