= Equaesi =

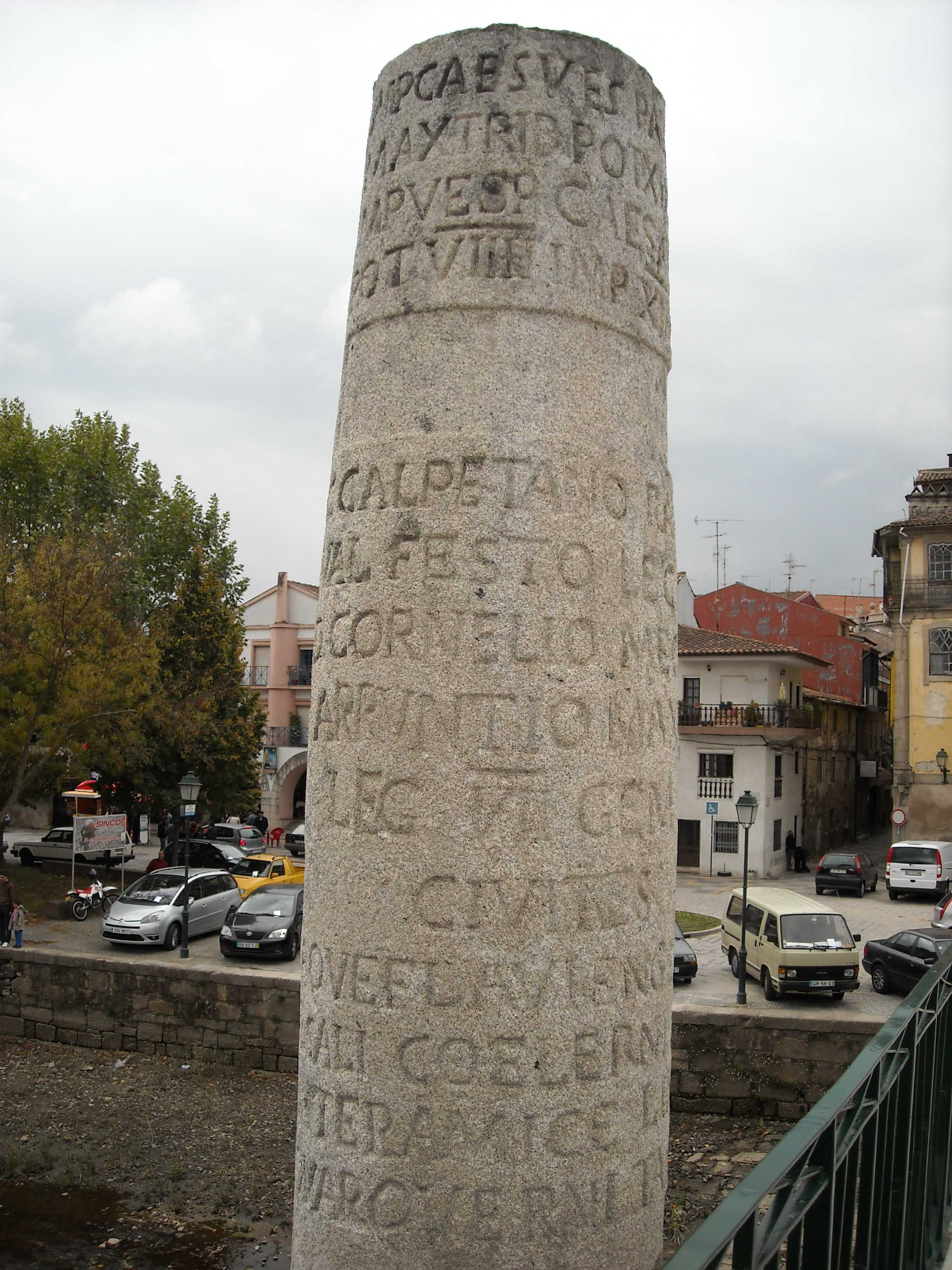
The Equaesi were one of the tribes acknowledged by the Romans for the construction of the Roman Bridge of Chaves (here seen on the Padrão dos Povos)

The Equaesi were an ancient Celtic tribe of Gallaecia, who lived in the north of modern Portugal, between the provinces of Minho and Trás-os-Montes, near the border of modern Galicia (Spain).

== See also ==
- Pre-Roman peoples of the Iberian Peninsula
