= Iadovi =

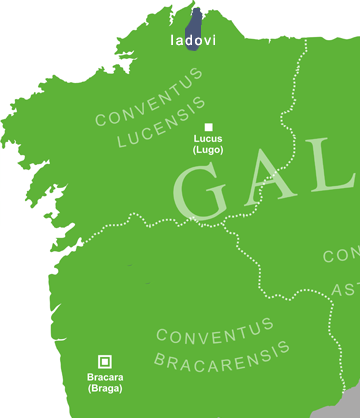
Map of Gallaecia

The Iadovi were an ancient Gallaecian Celtic tribe, living in the north of modern Galicia, around Viveiro's territory.

== See also ==
- Pre-Roman peoples of the Iberian Peninsula
