= Arroni =

Former Galleacian Celtic tribe

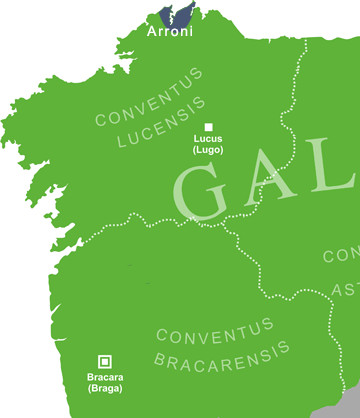
Map of Gallaecia

The Arroni or Arrotrebi were an ancient Gallaecian Celtic tribe, living in the north of modern Galicia, in the Ortigueira's county.

== See also ==
- Pre-Roman peoples of the Iberian Peninsula
