= Cibarci =

Ancient Gallaecian Celtic tribe

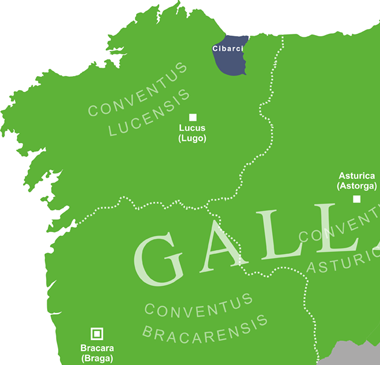
Map of Gallaecia

The Cibarci were an ancient Gallaecian Celtic tribe, living in the north-east of modern Galicia, in the Ribadeo's county.

== See also ==
- Pre-Roman peoples of the Iberian Peninsula
