= Celtici Supertamarici =

Ancient Gallaecian Celtic tribe

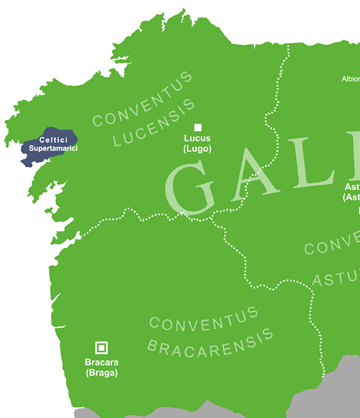
The Gallaecian Celtici Tribe on map

The Celtici Supertamarici were an ancient Gallaecian Celtic tribe, living in the west of what is now modern Galicia, in the Xallas comarcas.

== Etymology ==
It's unknown where the name originates. Some researchers suggest that the Supertamarici could be linked to a hydronym for the Adaja River. Other tribes with similar links appear in the Arevalillo region and the Eresma River.

== Geography ==
The Supertamarici neighboured south of the close Celtici Praestamarici tribe across the Tambre River.

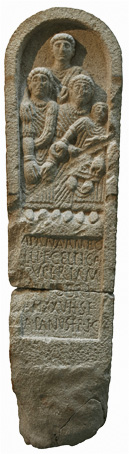
A Celto-Latin stele from Galicia dated to the 2nd century AD, mentioning the Celtici Supertamarici.

== See also ==
- Pre-Roman peoples of the Iberian Peninsula
