= Tamagani =

Ancient tribe of Gallaecia

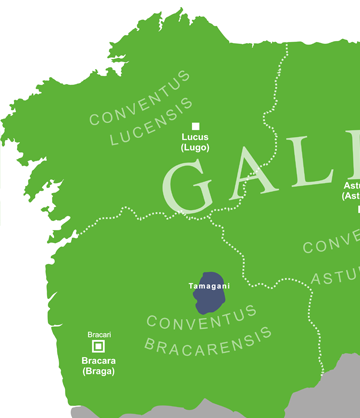
Tamagani

The Tamagani were an ancient Celtic tribe of Gallaecia, living in the north of modern Portugal, in the province of Trás-os-Montes, in the area of Chaves, near the river Tâmega.

== See also ==
- Pre-Roman peoples of the Iberian Peninsula
