= Lusarreta =

Lusarreta may refer to:

== People ==
Pilar de Lusarreta, Argentine author and critic

== Places ==
- Lusarreta, Arce, a human settlement in Arce, Spain
