= Seurri =

Ancient Gallaecian Celtic tribe

The Seurri were an ancient Gallaecian Celtic tribe, living in the center-east of modern Galicia, in the Sarria's county.

== See also ==
- Pre-Roman peoples of the Iberian Peninsula
