= Lapatianci =

Ancient Gallaecian Celtic tribe

The Lapatianci were an ancient Gallaecian Celtic tribe, living in the north of modern Galicia, in the Cedeira's county.

== See also ==
- Pre-Roman peoples of the Iberian Peninsula
