= Sordones =

The Iberian Peninsula in the 3rd century BC. The territory of the Sordones was right north to the orange area at the Mediterranean coastline.

The Sordones or Sordes were an ancient (Pre-Roman) people in the Roussillon, today a part of southern France, bordering Spain and the Mediterranean Sea. They are believed to have spoken the Iberian language. They are classified as ancient Iberian or as ancient Gauls according to the sources.

Their neighbors to the north were the Elisyces, to the south other Iberian peoples.

The main towns of the Sordones were Ruscino, present-day Château-Roussillon near Perpignan, and Illiberis, present day Elne.

The Roman poet Avienius, in his poem Ora Maritima, states that the Sordus river flowed through Sordon territory.

== See also ==
- Iberians
- Pre-Roman peoples of the Iberian Peninsula
