= Lacetani =

Pre-Roman people of the Iberian Peninsula

The Iberian Peninsula in the 3rd century BC

The Lacetani were an ancient Iberian (pre-Roman) people of the Iberian Peninsula (the Roman Hispania).

There remains some doubt whether their naming is not a corruption of either Laeetani or Iacetani, the names of two neighboring peoples.

== In classical geographers ==
Strabo, in a fairly refined geographic description, portrays a country that "begins at the foothills of the Pyrenees and then broadens out over the plains and joins the districts round about Ilerda and Osca, that is, the districts which belong to the Ilergetans, not very far from the Iberus... It is beyond Iaccetania, towards the north, that the tribe of the Vasconians is situated," However, he ascribes this country to the Iacetani. Surviving mentions in Livy suggest their neighbors, and possibly relatives or confederates, were the Ilergetes, Bergistani or Bargusii, Ausetani and Suessetani, who together populated the district at the foot of the Pyrenees, and north of the river Ebro.

In three points of Pliny the elder's geographical description of Hispania Citerior, variant readings with the name Lacetani exist, but more often these are reconstructed as one of the others: Laeetani, where he located them, with the Indigetes, after the Cessetani around Tarraco and the Ilergetes around Subur, on the river Rubricatus (Llobregat); Iacetani immediately following, when Pliny lists the Ausetani, Iacetani and Cerretani along the Pyrenees; Iacetani again, where they appear as a tributary of Rome in the conventus of Caesaraugusta.

Ptolemy located some ten towns among those in a territory, of the Lacetani or the Iacetani. They included:

- Aeso (Isona)
- Udura (Cardona?)
- Ascerris (related to the river Ésera? Segarra?)
- Setelsis/Selensis (Solsona)
- Telobis (Monzón? Martorell?)
- Ceresus (Seròs? Santa Coloma de Queralt?)
- Bacasis (Bagà? Manresa?)
- Iessus (Guissona? Igualada?)
- Anabis (Tàrrega?)
- Cinna

Most of these names have recently been tentatively related to early Indo-European roots, rather than Iberian or Celtic words. Another study concluded that an Indo-European layer is significant, some Vasconian is also found, and a possible Iberian layer may be hidden due to the limited knowledge of this language. The names, recorded by Roman writers, may reflect the languages of the settlements of their own time, or merely an older layer of names that were retained by newer populations.

== In classical historiography and literature ==
The name is mentioned by some Roman period writers. Livy's Lacetani first appear in the context of the early stages of the Second Punic War, with the Carthaginian occupation of Lacetania by Hannibal, on his way to cross the Pyrenees: "he led his troops across the Ebro in three columns, after sending agents ahead, to win over with presents the Gauls who dwelt in the region which the army had to cross, and to explore the passes of the Alps. ... He now subdued the Ilergetes, and the Bargusii and Ausetani, and also Lacetania, which lies at the foot of the Pyrenees." Secondly, a battle is described and placed shortly after Scipio Calvus's arrival in Hispania in 215 BCE; it tells that Roman forces defeated a Lacetani rescue force, on its way to a besieged Ausetanian city, after Hasdrubal the Carthaginian instigated the Ilergetes to into rebellion and these two peoples had joined. In the time of Scipio Africanus's commandment in Iberia, the Lacetani are said to have taken part in the rebellion under Indibilis and Mandonius, whom on this point the text presents as Lacetani rather than Ilergetes. Finally Livy writes of their part in the Iberian revolt of 197-195 BCE, and an attack that Cato the elder led on their city with Suessetani auxiliaries on his side. Incidentally, they are described: "The Lacetani, a remote and forest-dwelling race, were kept under arms, partly by their native savageness, partly by their consciousness of having pillaged the allies in sudden raids while the consul and the army were engaged in the campaign in Turdetania." According to Plutarch, the city harbored Roman deserters, who were sentenced to death after the victory (in marked difference from Scipio Africanus's approach), and the battle contributed to the quarrel between the two Romans.

Sallust's Histories has Lacetania as a territory that Pompey claimed to have recovered from Sertorius in 76 BCE. Strabo mentions the country's place in Roman internal wars: Sertorius and Pompey's war, the defeat of Pompey's generals in the Battle of Ilerda in Caesar's Civil War, and later battles of Sextus Pompey and Caesar's generals. Cassius Dio turns a light on the locals' alliances in the latter two. Once, writing that, "...it was with difficulty that he [Caesar, in Ilerda] managed to obtain provisions, inasmuch as he was in a hostile territory and unsuccessful in his operations. ... [After the Siege of Massilia], the victory was announced to the Spaniards with so much intentional exaggeration that it led some of them to change and take the side of Caesar." And again, that when Sextus Pompey fled from Hispania Baetica after the Battle of Munda, "he first came to Lacetania and concealed himself there. He was pursued, to be sure, but eluded discovery because the natives were kindly disposed to him out of regard for his father’s memory. Later, when Caesar had set out for Italy and only a small army was left in Baetica, Sextus was joined both by the natives and by those who had escaped from the battle; and with them he came again into Baetica, because he thought it a more suitable region in which to carry on war."

An even more obscure name has been brought into the mix. Martial in his epigrams recalled Laletana as a kind of cheap wine: "...Ask an innkeeper for Laletanian lees if you take more than ten drinks, Sextilianus." In another epigram, welcoming one Licinianus on his retirement from Rome's senate, Martial painted a scene from this country's life: "And when rimy December and winter wild shall howl with the hoarse North Wind, you will go back to the sunny shores of Tarraco and your own Laletania. There you will slaughter deer snared in soft-meshed toils and native boars and run the cunning hare to death with your stout horse (stags you will leave to the bailiff). The nearby wood shall come down right to your hearth and its girdle of grimy brats. The hunter will be invited; shout from close by, and a guest will come to share your dinner..." In a third epigram, Laletanae sapae wine appear as part of a list. Pliny made a similar note about a certain wine from Hispania as one from high yield vines. This term is most likely a variation on Laeetani rather than Lacetani. The focal point of Martial's Laletania might be found through recent research on Laeetanian wine-making, which became a major export industry in the relevant period. The Licinius family was a prominent grower, as gleamed from stamped amphoras, and their estates have been identified with the ruins in Lliçà (the current municipalities Lliçà d'Amunt and Lliçà de Vall), and possibly also in Granollers.

== Interpretations ==
Emil Hübner sought to identify the Lacetani with the Iacetani in most of the classical references, where the geographic context or progression of the text allows to link it to the mountainous region north of Caesaraugusta. He excepted Livy 21.60-61, and Pliny 3.4.22 — as these passages show a coastal context that better fits the Laeetani — and was not decided if Laletania (and its wine) should be treated as a separate coastal group or a variation of Laeetani. He noted Theodor Mommsen's view, that the alteration of L and I can reflect a Spanish ll sound. His view has been well received, at least in the following decades.

Guido Barbieri favored the view that all three people existed (and he too was not decided about the Laletani). The name is too widely used to be regarded as a collection of transmission errors. The description of the Lacetani as living at the foot of the Pyrenees, with the Ausetani, Laeetani and Suessetani on their east, the Cerretani on their north, and Ilergetes on their west (across the river Segre), was taken as consistent and complementing across several geographical passages from Livy, Pliny and Strabo. The Iacetani's territory as much farther, still west of the Ilergetes, and fixed around Iacca. Other passages were interpreted as confused in the original texts: Ptolemy's list of cities, of which about seven are tentatively identified, as Lacetanian territories, which Ptolemy must have confusedly ascribed to the Iacetani; Pliny's listing of cities under the conventus of Caesaraugusta and that of Tarraconensis; and since the Laeetani, on the coast, turn out to be adjacent to the Lacetani, Barbieri found the references to the episodes of Pompey and Sextus Pompey as ambiguous in their localization; however, Hannibal's episode agrees with the geographical descriptions, and Cato's has to be assigned to the real Lacetani, too. Finally, the Lacetani may actually be a substituent of the Ilergetes, or at least closely related, which would explain both the double identification of Indibilis and Mandonius, and why Greek geographers did not list them by name.

== See also ==
- Iberians
- Pre-Roman peoples of the Iberian Peninsula
