= Luanqui =

Ancient Celtic tribe of Gallaecia

The Luanqvi were an ancient Celtic tribe of Gallaecia, living in the north of modern Portugal, in the province of Trás-os-Montes, between the rivers Tâmega and Tua.

== See also ==
- Pre-Roman peoples of the Iberian Peninsula
