= Turodi =

The Turodi were an ancient Celtic tribe of Gallaecia, living in the north of modern Portugal, in the province of Trás-os-Montes and border areas in Galicia (Spain).

== See also ==
- Pre-Roman peoples of the Iberian Peninsula
