= Limici =

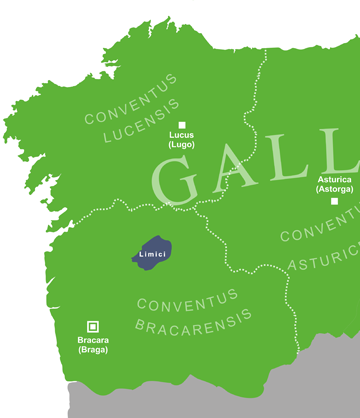
Map of Gallaecia

The Limici were an ancient Celtic tribe of Gallaecia, living in the swamps of the river Lima, in the border region between Minho (Portugal) and Galicia (Spain).

== See also ==
- Pre-Roman peoples of the Iberian Peninsula
