= Narbasi =

The Narbasi were an ancient Celtic tribe of Gallaecia, living in the province of Minho (north of modern Portugal) and nearby areas of modern Galicia (Spain).

== See also ==
- Pre-Roman peoples of the Iberian Peninsula
