= Bastetani =

Ancient people of the Iberian peninsula

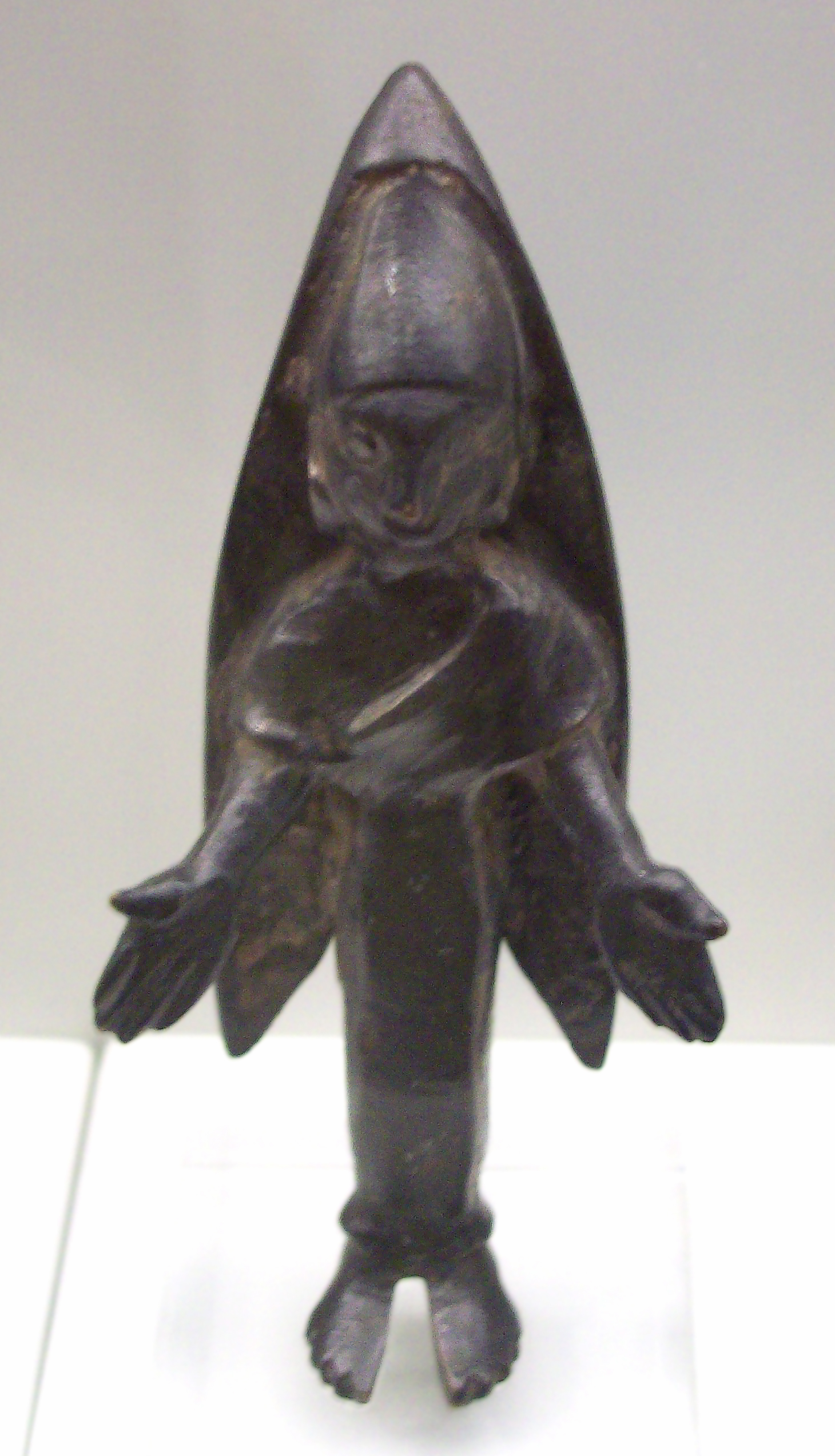
Bronze votive feminine figure of the Bastetani

The Iberian Peninsula in the 3rd century BC

Territory of the Bastetani

The Bastetani or Bastuli were an ancient Iberian (pre-Roman) people of the Iberian Peninsula (the Roman Hispania). They are believed to have spoken the Iberian language. The relationship between the Iberian Bastetani and the Tartessian Mastieni (who lived in Mastia, on the southeastern coast of the peninsula) is not entirely clear.

Their territory Bastetania extended through the southeastern Iberian Peninsula, which currently encompasses southern Albacete, Almería, Granada, eastern Málaga, southeastern Jaén and western Murcia. Their main towns were located between Baria (present-day Villaricos) and Bailo (Cádiz), also including Malaka, Abdera, Sexi and Carteia. Their capital was probably the city known as Basti by the Romans, which corresponds to present-day Baza. The Lady of Baza, a famous Bastetani sculpture, was recovered from the necropolis of Basti in 1971.

== See also ==
- Iberians
- Pre-Roman peoples of the Iberian Peninsula
- Lady of Baza

== Bibliography ==
- Ángel Montenegro et alii, Historia de España 2 - colonizaciones y formación de los pueblos prerromanos (1200-218 a.C), Editorial Gredos, Madrid (1989) ISBN 84-249-1386-8
