= Seurbi =

The Seurbi were a pre-Roman group of tribes living in the north of modern Portugal, in the province of Minho, between the rivers Cávado and Lima (or even reaching the river Minho).

== See also ==
- Pre-Roman peoples of the Iberian Peninsula
