= Leuni =

Ancient Celtic tribe of Gallaecia

The Leuni were an ancient Celtic tribe of Gallaecia, living in the north of modern Portugal, in the province of Minho, between the rivers Lima and Minho.

== See also ==
- Pre-Roman peoples of the Iberian Peninsula
