= Bergistani =

Ancient people of the Iberian peninsula

The Iberian Peninsula in the 3rd century BC

The Bergistani or Bargusii (Ancient Greek: Βαργουσίοι, romanized: Bargousíoi), were an ancient Iberian or Pre-Roman people of the Iberian Peninsula. They were related to the Ilergetes and were not numerous. They inhabited the valley of the Saiarra river in the upper course of the Llobregat in the northern Tarraconense.

== History ==
The Bergistani were defeated by Hannibal during his overland journey to Italy at the beginning of the Second Punic War, having initially tended to side with the Roman republic. They rebelled against Rome in 197 BC, in the context of the Iberian revolt. The rebellion was put down by consul Cato the Elder. When they rose in revolt for the second time, the city of Bergium was taken with the help of a Bergistani factionist, and they were all sold to slavery. Livy mentions that the Bergistani had seven castles or fortifications. Their main castle, Castrum Bergium, could correspond to present-day Berga. Other possibilities include Balaguer, Organyà, Velilla de Ebro, Pertusa and Bergús. Ptolemy does not mention the people but he has both Βεργουσία (Bergusia) and Βέργιδον (Bergidon) in the territory of the Ilergetes.

== See also ==
- Pre-Roman peoples of the Iberian Peninsula

== Bibliography ==
- Ángel Montenegro et alii, Historia de España 2 - colonizaciones y formación de los pueblos prerromanos (1200-218 a.C), Editorial Gredos, Madrid (1989) ISBN 84-249-1386-8
