= Celtici Praestamarici =

Ancient Gallaecian Celtic tribe

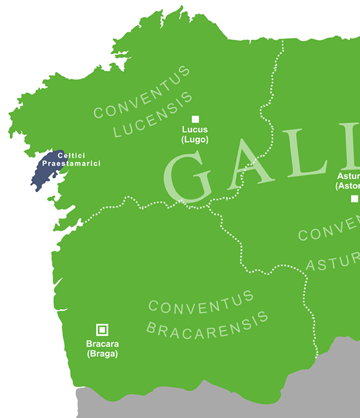
Map of Gallaecia

The Celtici Praestamarici were an ancient Gallaecian Celtic tribe, living in the west of modern Galicia, in the Barbanza's county.

== See also ==
- Pre-Roman peoples of the Iberian Peninsula
