= Trás-os-Montes Province =

Medieval Portuguese province

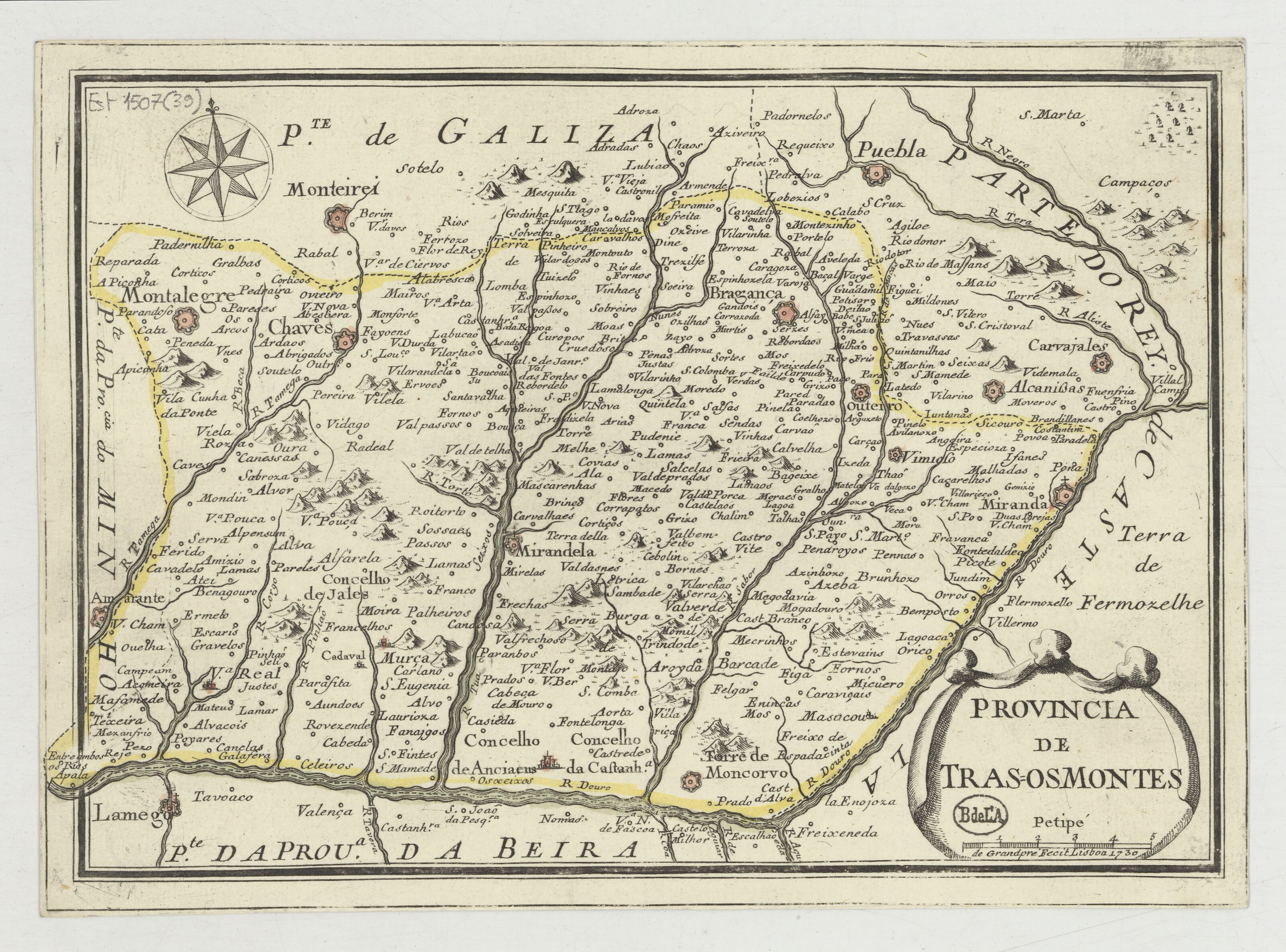
Map of Trás-os-Montes from 1730

Trás-os-Montes Province (Portuguese pronunciation: [ˌtɾaz uʒ ˈmõtɨʃ]) is one of the medieval provinces of Portugal.

The northern part is covered by Terras de Trás-os-Montes and Alto Tâmega, the southern by Douro Subregion.

== See also ==
- Trás-os-Montes (region)
- Trás-os-Montes e Alto Douro Province
