= Ausetani =

Pre-Roman people of the Iberian Peninsula

The Iberian Peninsula in the 3rd century BC

The Ausetani were an ancient Iberian (pre-Roman) people of the Iberian Peninsula (the Roman Hispania). They are believed to have spoken the Iberian language. They lived in the eponymous region of Ausona and gave their name to the Roman city of Ausa.

== Culture ==
The Ausetani minted their own coins which bore the inscription ausesken in northeastern Iberian script that is interpreted in Iberian language as a self-reference to the ethnic name of that people: from the Ausetani or from those of Ausa.

== Territory ==
The Ausetani people occupied the basin that now corresponds to the comarca of Osona in inland Catalonia, an area centred on the plain of Vic. Their main settlement, Ausa, stood at the site of the modern city of Vic and later became a Roman town under the same name. The people's name is preserved in the medieval and modern territorial designation Ausona, which the region retained after the Roman and Visigothic periods.

== See also ==
- Iberians
- Pre-Roman peoples of the Iberian Peninsula
