= Ilergetes =

Ancient people in Spain

The Iberian Peninsula in the 3rd century BC.

The Ilergetes were an ancient Iberian (Pre-Roman) people of the Iberian Peninsula (the Roman Hispania) who dwelt in the plains area of the rivers Segre and Cinca towards Iberus (Ebro) river, and in and around Ilerda/Iltrida, present-day Lleida/Lérida. They are believed to have spoken the Iberian language.

== History ==
Indibilis and Mandonius, brothers and chieftains of the Ilergetes, resisted the Carthaginian and Roman invasions in the 3rd century BC.

== See also ==
- Iberians
- Pre-Roman peoples of the Iberian Peninsula
