= Iberians =

Historical ethnic group from southwestern Europe

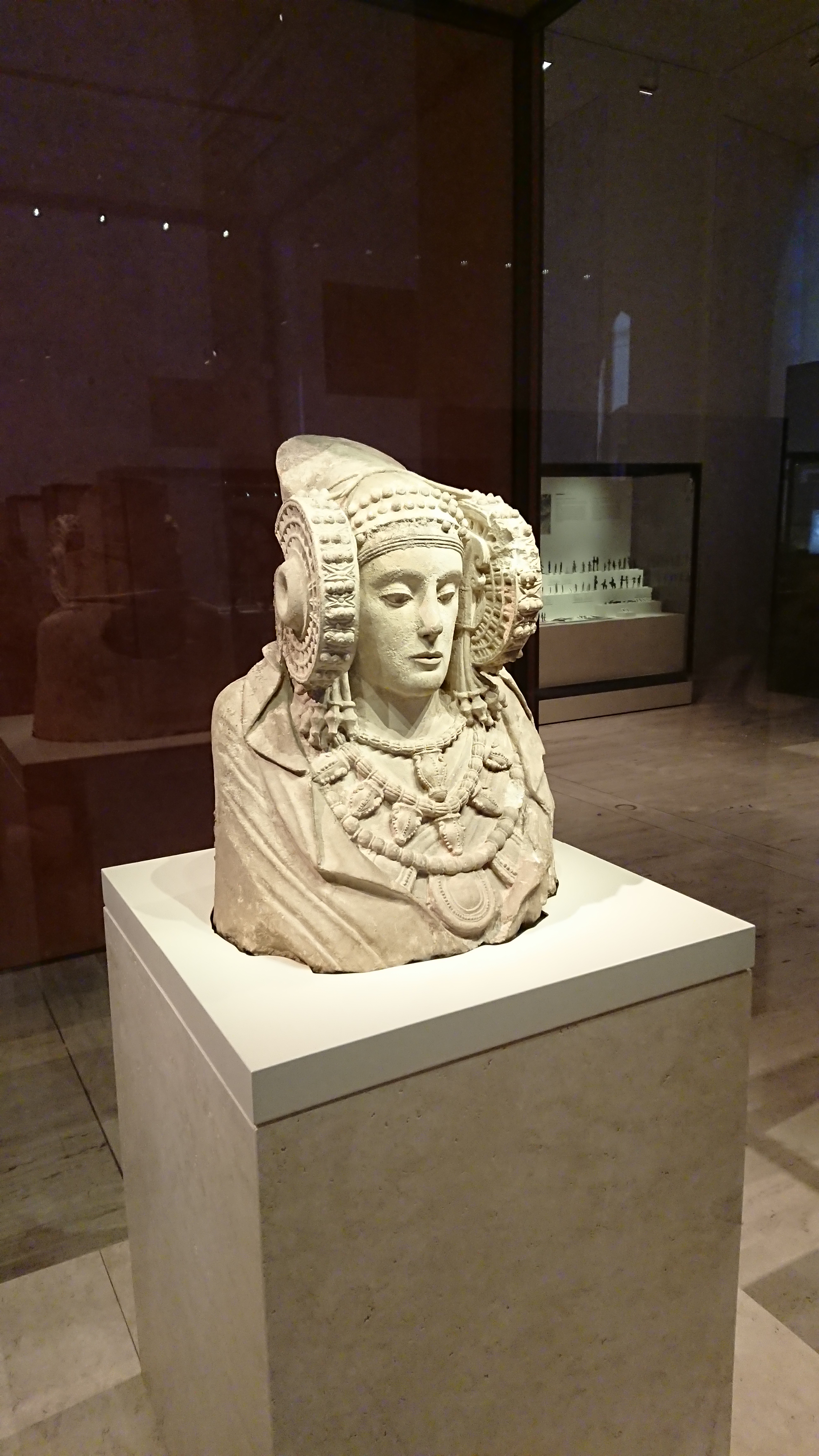
The famous bust of the "Lady of Elche", probably a priestess.

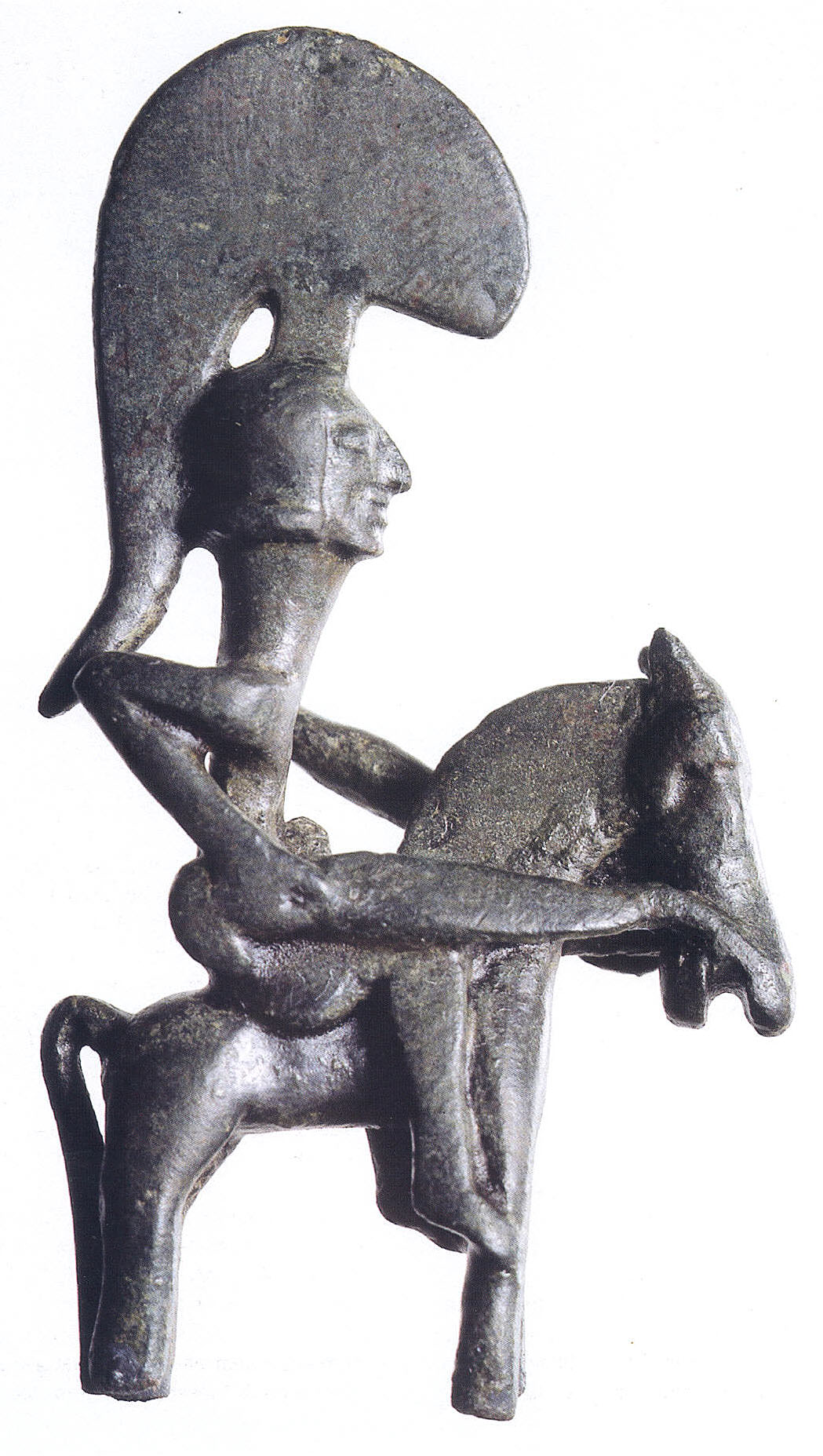
"Warrior of Moixent" Iberian (Edetan) ex-voto statuette, 2nd to 4th centuries BC, found in Edeta.

The Iberians (Latin: hiberi (m.), hiberae (f.), from Ancient Greek: ἴβηρες, ἰβηρίδες, romanized: íbēres, ibērídes; Catalan: ibers, iberes; Spanish: íberos, íberas) were an ancient people indigenous to the eastern and southern coasts of the Iberian Peninsula. They are described in Greek and Roman sources (among others, by Hecataeus of Miletus, Herodotus, Strabo and Avienius). Roman sources also use the terms hispani and hispanae to refer to the Iberians.

The term Iberian, as used by the ancient authors, had two distinct meanings. One, more general, referred to all the populations of the Iberian peninsula without regard to ethnic differences (Pre-Indo-European, Celts and non-Celtic Indo-Europeans). The other, more restricted ethnic sense and the one dealt with in this article, refers to the people living in the eastern and southern coasts of the Iberian Peninsula, which by the 6th century BC had absorbed cultural influences from the Phoenicians, Carthaginians and the Greeks. This pre-Indo-European cultural group spoke the Iberian language from the 7th to at least the 1st century BC. The rest of the peninsula, in the northern, central, and northwestern areas, was inhabited by Vascones, Celts or Celtiberians groups and the possibly Pre-Celtic or Proto-Celtic Indo-European Lusitanians, Vettones, and Turdetani.

Starting in the 5th century BC, Iberian soldiers were frequently deployed in battles in Italy, Greece and especially Sicily due to their military qualities.

== History ==
The Iberians were an ancient people indigenous to the Iberian Peninsula. Iberian culture developed from the 6th century BC, and perhaps as early as the fifth to the third millennium BC in the eastern and southern coasts of the Iberian Peninsula. The Iberians lived in villages and oppida (fortified settlements) and their communities were based on a tribal organization. The Iberians in the Spanish Levant were more urbanized than their neighbors in the central and northwestern regions of the Iberian Peninsula. The peoples in the central and northwest regions were mostly speakers of Celtic dialects, semi-pastoral and lived in scattered villages, though they also had a few fortified towns like Numantia. They had a knowledge of writing, metalworking, including bronze, and agricultural techniques.

=== Settlements ===
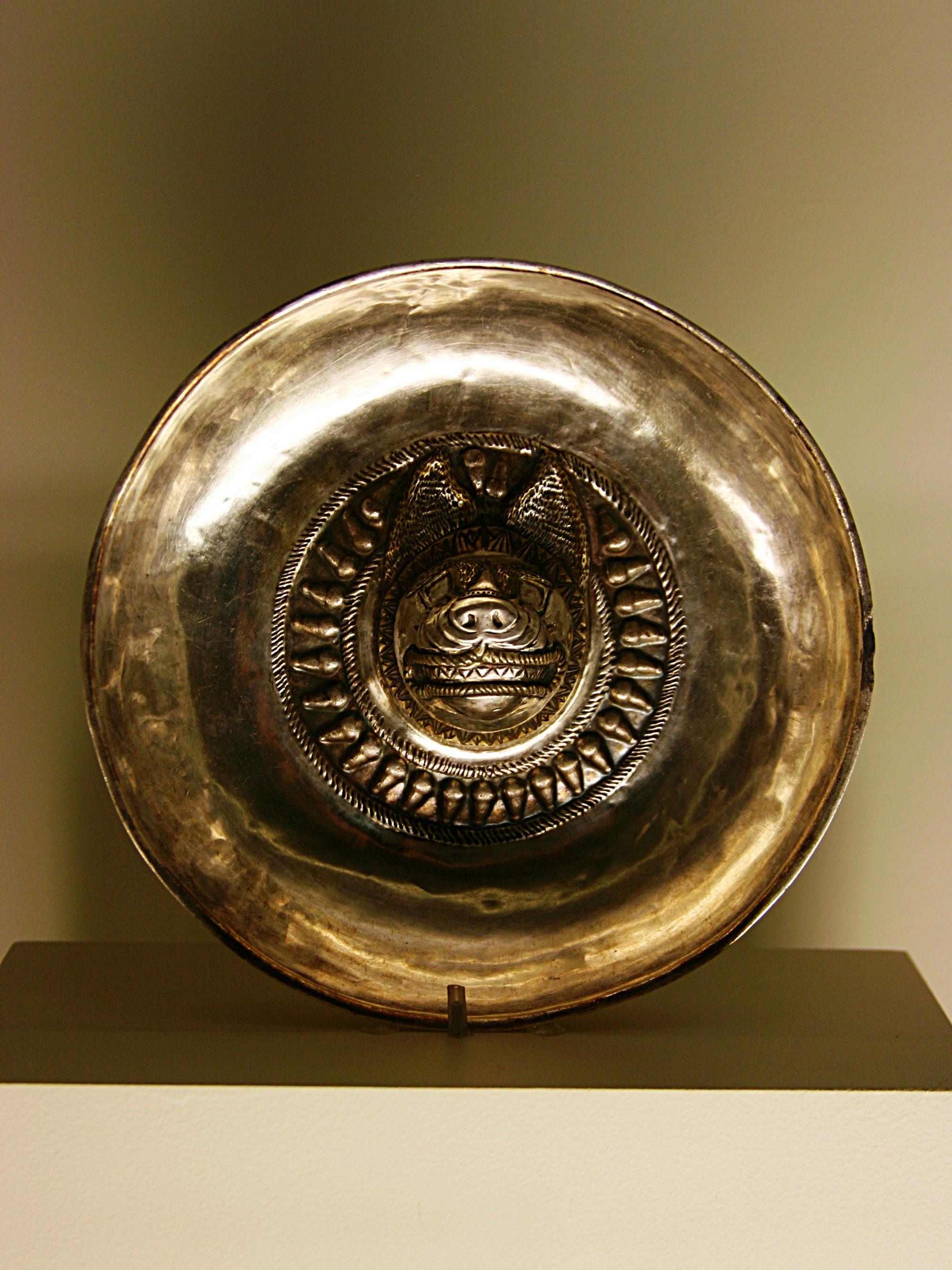
Ancient silver vessel from the Tivissa Treasure, c. 500 BC. Archaeology Museum of Catalonia

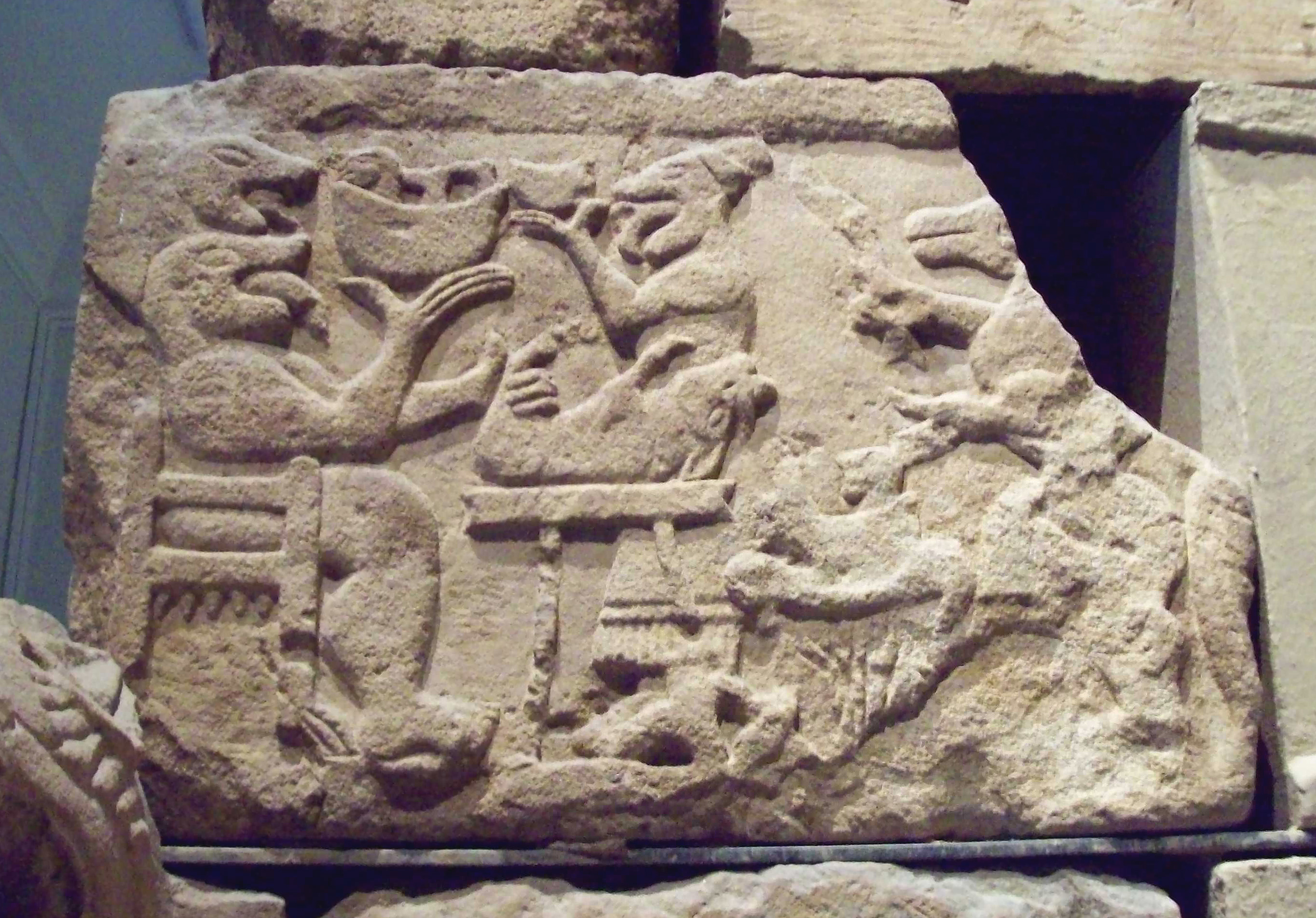
Iberian relief, Mausoleum of Pozo Moro, 6th century BC, showing Hittite influence

In the centuries preceding Carthaginian and Roman conquest, Iberian settlements grew in social complexity, exhibiting evidence of social stratification and urbanization. This process was probably aided by trading contacts with the Phoenicians, Greeks, and Carthaginians. By the late 5th and early 4th centuries BC a series of important social changes led to the consolidation of an aristocracy and the emergence of a clientele system. "This new political system led, among other things, to cities and towns that centered around these leaders, also known as territorial nucleation. In this context, the oppidum or fortified Iberian town became the centre of reference in the landscape and the political space."

The settlement of Castellet de Banyoles in Tivissa was one of the most important ancient Iberian settlements in the northeastern part of the Iberian Peninsula that was discovered in 1912. Also, the 'Treasure of Tivissa', a unique collection of silver Iberian votive offerings was found here in 1927.

Lucentum was another ancient Iberian settlement, as well as Castelldefels Castle.

Mausoleum of Pozo Moro near the town of Chinchilla de Monte-Aragón in Castile-La Mancha seems to mark the location of another big settlement.

Sagunto is the location of an ancient Iberian and later Roman city of Saguntum, where a big fortress was built in the 5th century BC.

Greek colonists made the first historical reference to the Iberians in the 6th century BC. They defined Iberians as non-Celtic peoples south of the Ebro river (Iber). The Greeks also dubbed as "Iberians" another people in the Caucasus region, currently known as Caucasian Iberians. It is thought that there is no connection between the two peoples.

The Iberians traded extensively with other Mediterranean cultures. Iberian pottery and metalwork has been found in France, Italy, and North Africa. The Iberians had extensive contact with Greek colonists in the colonies of Emporion, Rhode, and Hemeroskopeion. The Iberians may have adopted some of the Greeks' artistic techniques. Statues such as the Lady of Baza and the Lady of Elche are thought to have been made by Iberians relatively well acquainted with Greek art. Thucydides stated that one of the three original tribes of Sicily, the Sicani, were of Iberian origin, though "Iberian" at the time could have included what we think of as Gaul.

The Iberians were also in contact with the Phoenicians, who had established various colonies in southern Andalucia. Their first colony on the Iberian Peninsula was founded in 1100 BC and was originally called Gadir, later renamed by the Romans as Gades (modern Cádiz). Other Phoenician colonies in southern Iberia included Malaka (Málaga), Sexi and Abdera.

According to Arrian, the Iberians sent emissaries to Alexander the Great in 324 BC, along with other embassies of Carthaginians, Italics and Gauls, to request his friendship.

=== Second Punic War and Roman conquest ===
Iberia during the Second Punic War, showing the short-lived Carthaginian (yellow) and Roman (red) territories and allies

After the First Punic War, the massive war debt suffered by Carthage led the city-state to expand its control over the Iberian Peninsula. Hamilcar Barca began this conquest from his base at Cádiz by conquering the Tartessian Guadalquivir river region, which was rich in silver. After Hamilcar's death, his son-in-law Hasdrubal the Fair continued his incursions into Iberia, founding the colony of Qart Hadasht (modern Cartagena) and extending his influence all the way to the southern bank of the river Ebro. After Hasdrubal's assassination in 221 BC, Hannibal assumed command of the Carthaginian forces and spent two years completing the conquest of the Iberians south of the Ebro. In his first campaign, Hannibal defeated the Olcades, the Vaccaei and the Carpetani expanding his control over the river Tagus region. Hannibal then laid siege to the Roman ally of Saguntum, which led to the beginning of the Second Punic War. The Iberian theater was a key battleground during this war and many Iberian and Celtiberian warriors fought for both Rome and Carthage, though most tribes sided with Carthage.

Rome sent Gnaeus and Publius Cornelius Scipio to conquer Iberia from Carthage. Gnaeus subsequently defeated the Iberian Ilergetes tribe north of the Ebro which was allied with Carthage, conquered the Iberian oppidum of Tarraco and defeated the Carthaginian fleet. After the arrival of Publius Scipio, Tarraco was fortified and, by 211 BC, the Scipio brothers had overrun the Carthaginian and allied forces south of the Ebro. However, during this campaign, Publius Scipio was killed in battle and Gnaeus died in the retreat. The tide turned with the arrival of Publius Cornelius Scipio Africanus in 210 BC. Scipio attacked and conquered Carthago Nova and defeated the army of Hasdrubal Barca at the Battle of Baecula (209–208). The war dragged on with Carthage sending more reinforcements until the Battle of Ilipa (modern Alcalá del Río in Sevilla province), which was a decisive victory for Publius Scipio Africanus. The Carthaginians retreated to Gades, and Publius Scipio gained control over the entire south of the peninsula. After this victory, the Ilergetes and other Iberian tribes revolted and it was only after this revolt that the Romans conquered the rest of the Carthaginian territories in southern Spain.

After the Carthaginian defeat, the Iberian territories were divided into two major provinces, Hispania Ulterior and Hispania Citerior. In 197 BC, the Iberian tribes revolted once again in the Hispania Citerior province. After securing these regions, Rome invaded and conquered Lusitania and Celtiberia. The Romans fought a long and drawn-out campaign for the conquest of Lusitania. Wars and campaigns in the northern regions of the Iberian Peninsula would continue until 16 BC, when the last rebellions were defeated during the Cantabrian Wars.

== Iberian culture ==
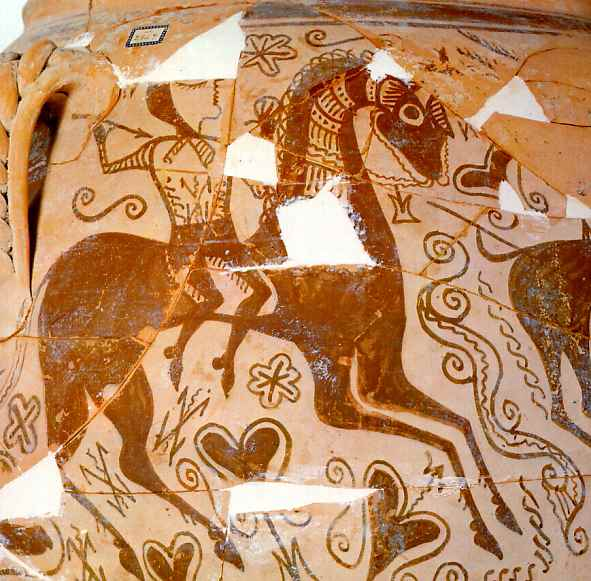
Horseman from Iberian pottery, Alicante

Iberian society was divided into different classes, including kings or chieftains (Latin: "regulus"), nobles, priests, artisans and slaves. Iberian aristocracy, often called a "senate" by the ancient sources, met in a council of nobles. Kings or chieftains would maintain their forces through a system of obligation or vassalage that the Romans termed "fides".

The Iberians adopted wine and olives from the Greeks. Horse breeding was particularly important to the Iberians and their nobility. Mining was also very important for their economy, especially the silver mines near Gader and Cartago Nova, the iron mines in the Ebro valley, as well as the exploitation of tin and copper deposits. They produced fine metalwork and high quality iron weapons such as the falcata.

=== Art and religion ===
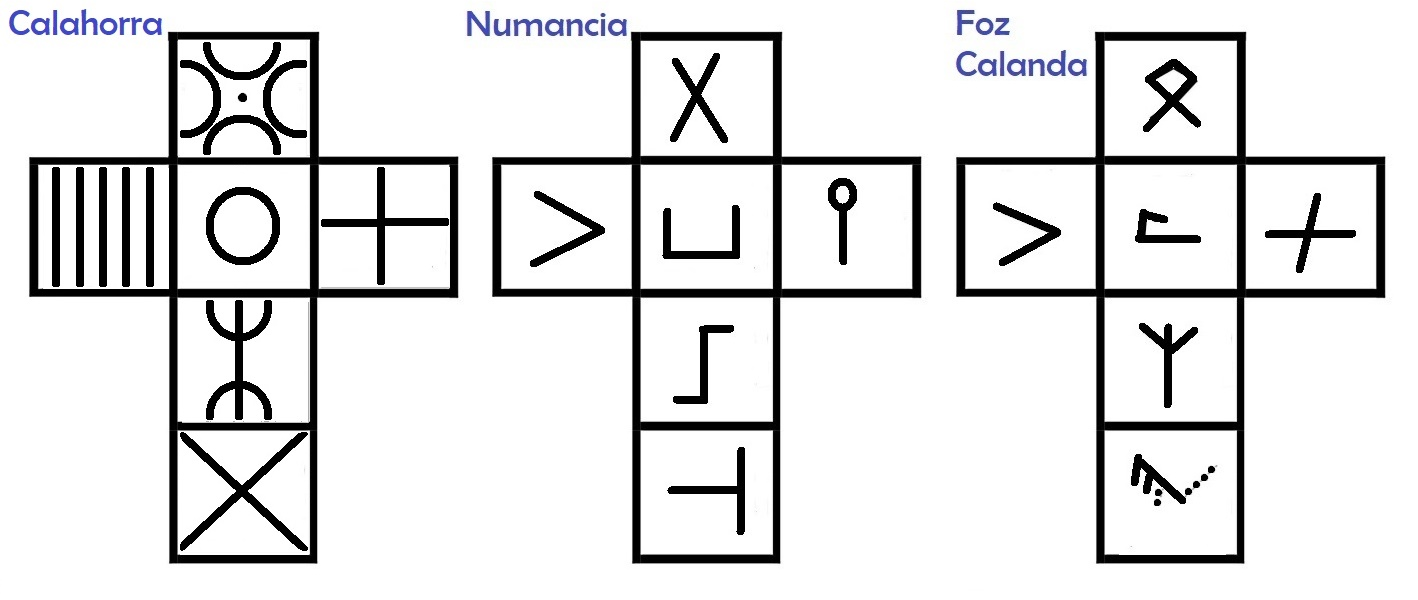
Three different dice with Iberian inscriptions, found in Calahorra, Numantia and Foz-Calanda

The Iberians produced sculpture in stone and bronze, most of which was much influenced by the Greeks, Carthaginians, and Phoenicians, and other cultures such as Assyrian, Hittite and Egyptian influences. The styles of Iberian sculpture are divided geographically into the Levantine, Central, Southern, and Western groups, of which the Levantine group displays the most noticeable Greek influence. Iberian pottery and painting was also distinct and widespread throughout the region. A distinct feature of the culture, the pottery was primarily decorated with geometric forms in red but also included figurative images in some areas (from Murcia to the south of Catalonia).

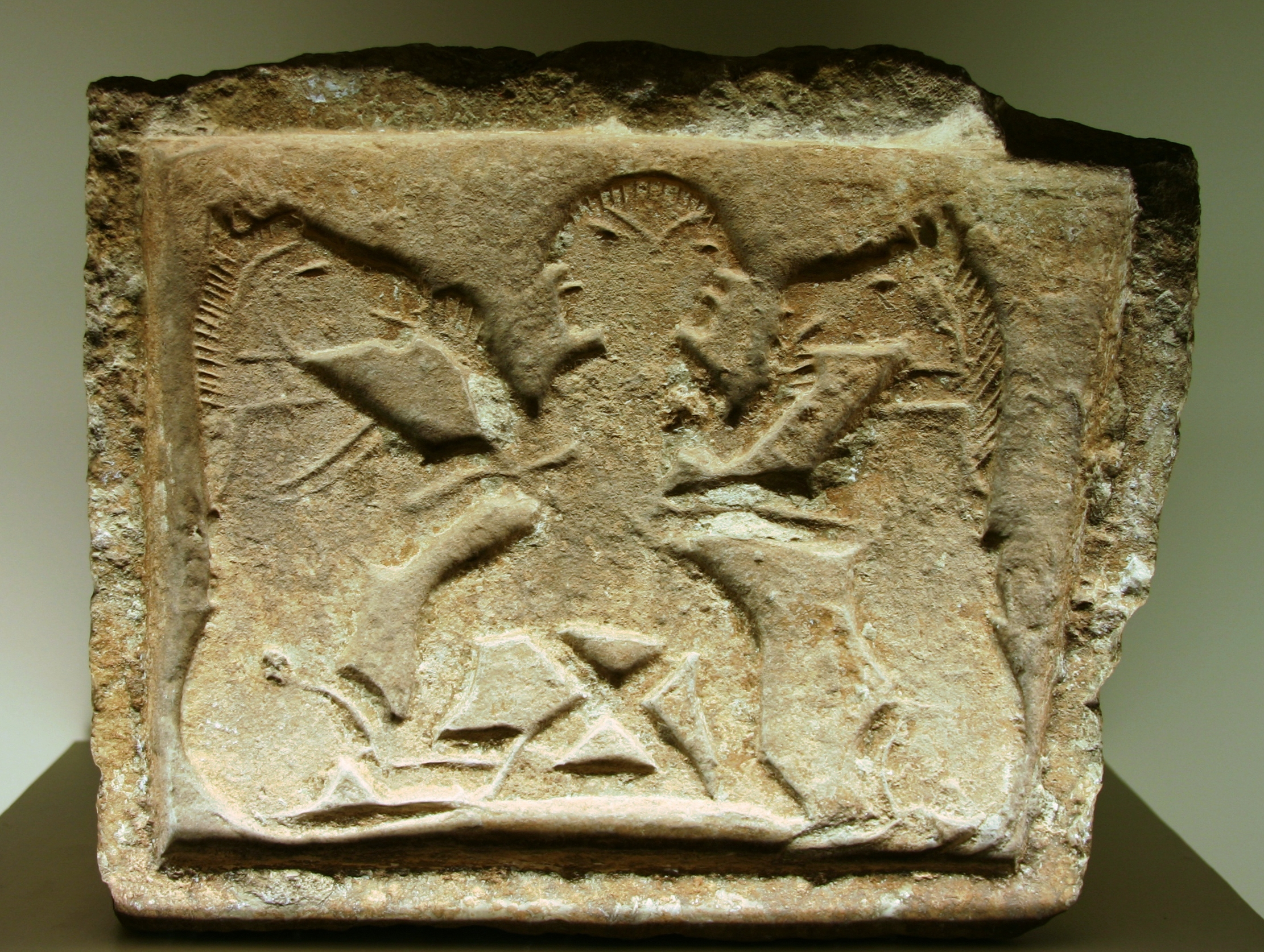
Lord of the Horses, Villaricos (Almeria), Museu d'Arqueologia de Catalunya, Barcelona

The Iberian polytheistic religion was influenced by the Greek, Carthaginian, and Phoenician practices, as evidenced by their sculptures. The man-bull Bicha of Balazote (possibly a fertility deity) and various depictions of sphinxes and lions bear a resemblance to eastern Mediterranean mythological creatures. The Lady of Elche and Lady of Guardamar show clear Hellenistic influence. Phoenician, Carthaginian and Greek deities like Tanit, Baal, Melqart, Artemis, Demeter and Asclepius were known in the region and worshiped. Few native Iberian gods are currently known, though the oracular healing deity "Betatun" is known from a Latin inscription at Fuertes del Rey. There was clearly an important female deity associated with the earth and regeneration as depicted by the Lady of Baza and linked with birds, flowers and wheat. The horse was also an important religious figure and an important sanctuary dedicated to Horses has been found in Mula (Murcia). There are many depictions of a "horse taming god" or "lord of the horses" (despotes hippon). The female goddess Ataegina is also widely attested in the inscriptions.

Iberians performed their rites in the open and also maintained sanctuaries in holy places like groves, springs and caves. Archaeological evidence suggests the existence of a priestly class and Silius Italicus mentions priests in the region of Tartessos at a temple of Melqart. Evidence from pottery reveals some information about Iberian myth and ritual. Common themes are a celebratory ritual dance described by Strabo [cf. 3.3.7.] and seen in a relief from Fuerte del Rey known as the "Bastetania dance" and the confrontation between the deceased and a wolf figure. Ritual sacrifice of animals was also common.

In Iberian eschatology, "death was seen as the starting point for a journey symbolised by a crossing of the sea, the land or even the sky. Supernatural and mythical beings, such as the Sphinx or the wolf, and sometimes Divinity itself, accompanied and guided the deceased on this journey". The Iberians incinerated their dead and placed their ashes in ceremonial urns, the remains were then placed in stone tombs.

=== Warfare ===
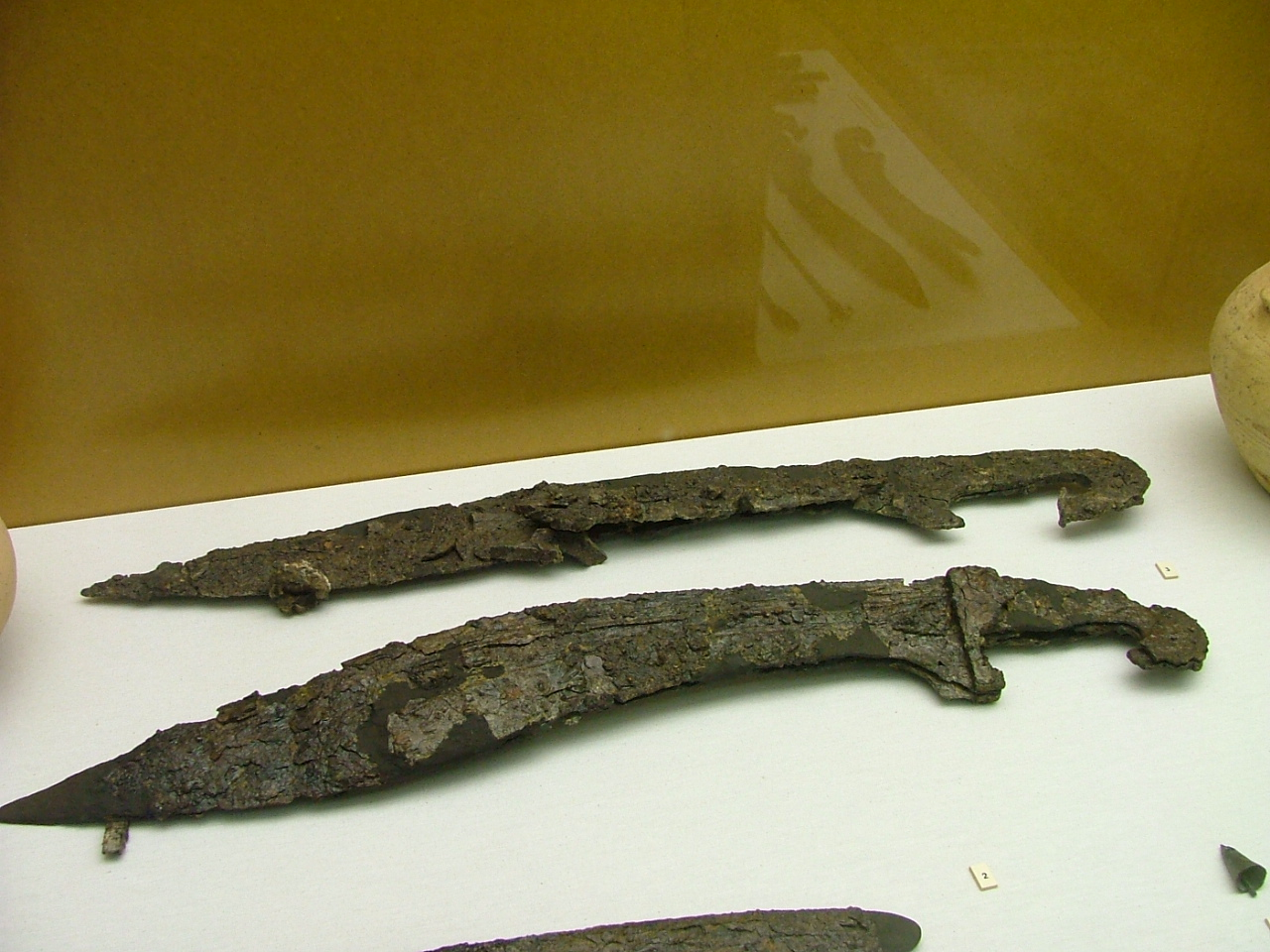
Iberian falcatas

Iberian soldiers were widely employed by Carthage and Rome as mercenaries and auxiliary troops. A large portion of Carthaginian forces during the Punic wars was made up of Iberians and Celtiberians. Iberian warfare was endemic and based on intertribal raiding and pillaging. In set piece battle, Iberians were known to regularly charge and retreat, throwing javelins and shouting at their opponents without actually committing to full contact combat. This sort of fighting was termed concursare by the Romans. The Iberians were particularly fond of ambushes and guerrilla tactics.

Ancient sources mention two major types of Iberian infantry, scutati and caetrati. Scutati were heavily armored and carried large Italic style scutum shields. The caetrati carried the caetra, a small Iberian buckler. Iberian armaments included the famed Gladius Hispaniensis, a curved sword called the falcata, straight swords, spears, javelins and an all iron spear called the Soliferrum. Iberian horsemen were a key element of Iberian forces as well as Carthaginian armies. Spain was rich with excellent wild horses and Iberian cavalry was some of the best in the ancient Mediterranean.

=== Iberian tribes ===
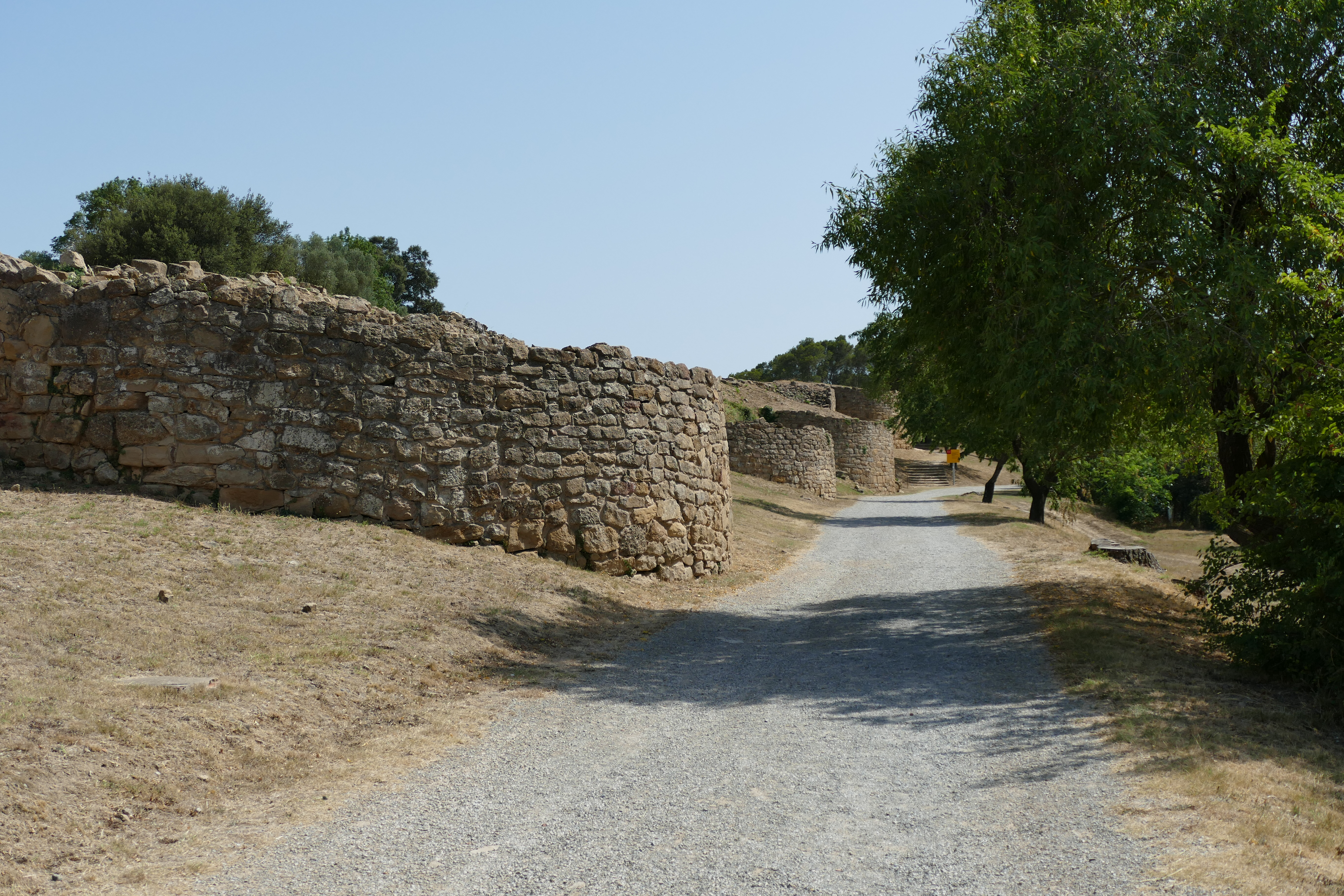
Remains of the walls of Ullastret, Catalonia

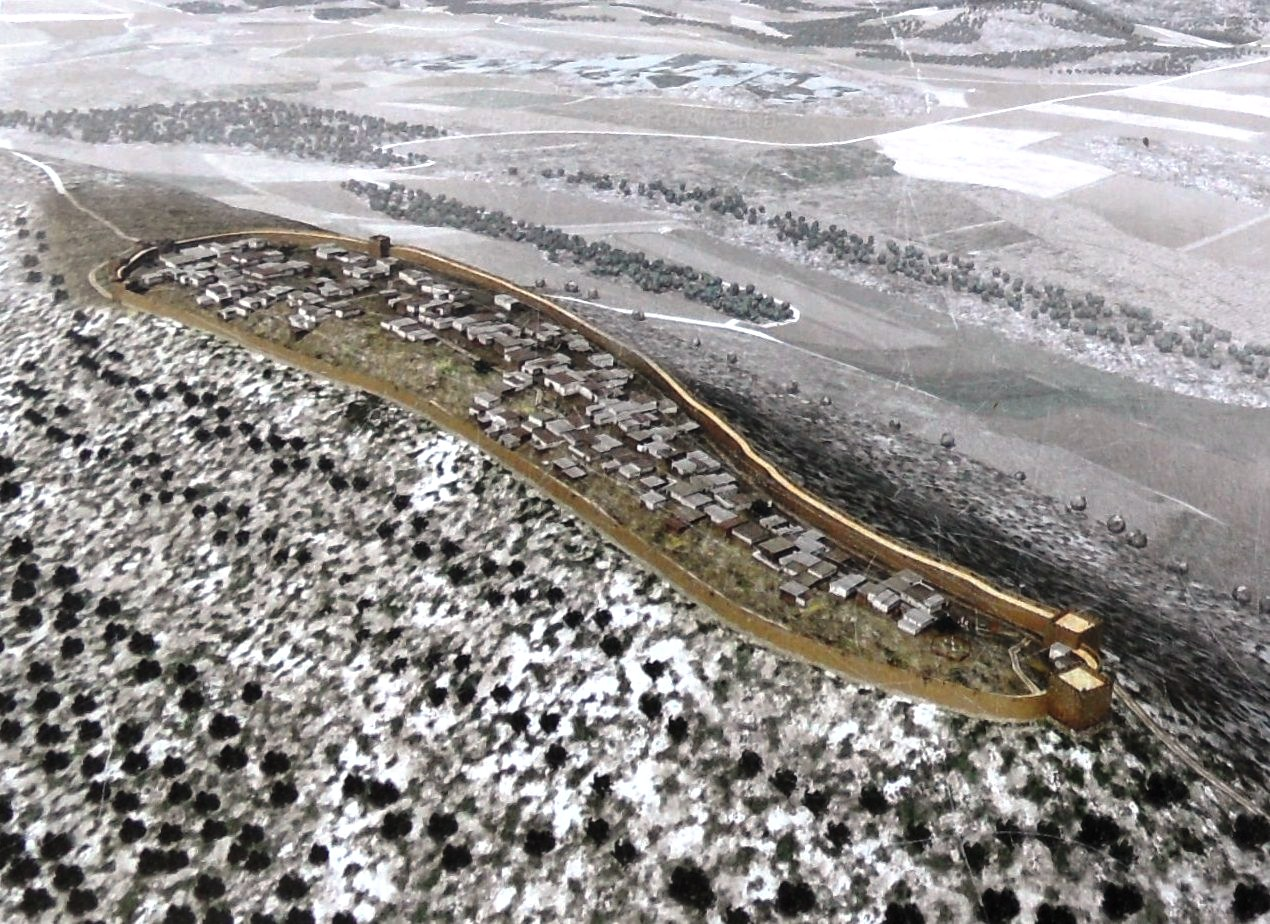
La Bastida de les Alcusses, Valencia

Iberians dwelt along eastern and southern coastal regions of the Iberian Peninsula, that corresponds to the northwestern shores of the Mediterranean Sea (see the map), roughly in today's Catalonia, Eastern, Northeastern and Northern Aragon, Valencian Community, Murcia Region, Eastern Andalucia, and the Balearic Islands (in Spain), and also in today's Roussillon and parts of Languedoc (in France). The peninsula has this name because ancient Greeks, Romans and other mediterranean peoples first contacted with peoples (tribes or tribal confederacies) that were Iberians in the ethnic and linguistic sense, although the majority of the Iberian Peninsula's peoples, that dwelt in the Northern, Central and Western regions (the majority of the peninsula's area), were not Iberians themselves in the ethnic and linguistic sense (they could only be considered Iberians in the geographical sense, i.e. they dwelt in the Iberian Peninsula).

The Iberian tribes or tribal confederacies were:

- Andosini - in the mountains of East Pyrenees southern slopes, in the high Segre river basin, area of modern Andorra.
- Ausetani - in the Osona region (old County of Osona), in the middle Ter river basin. Ausa (today's Vic) was their main centre.
- Bastetani/Bastitani/Bastuli - The biggest iberian tribal confederation in area, they dwelt in a territory that included large areas of the Mediterranean coast and the Sierra Nevada, in what are today parts of the modern provinces of Murcia, Albacete, Jaén, Almería, Granada and Málaga. Basti (today's Baza) was their main centre.
  - Mastieni - in and around Mastia territory (Cartagena).
- Bergistani/Bergusii - in the high Llobregat river basin, roughly in today's Barcelona province. Berga was their main centre. North of the Lacetani.
- Castellani - in the high Ter river basin, East Pyrenees southern slopes. North of the Ausetani.
- Cessetani/Cossetani - in the Tarraco region (roughly in today's central and east Tarragona province), in the mediterranean coastal region. Kese (Tarraco in Roman times, that would become the Hispania Tarraconensis capital), was their main centre.
- Ceretani/Cerretani - in Cerretana (today's Cerdanya/Cerdaña) and other East Pyrenees mountains southern slopes, also in the high Segre and Noguera rivers basins (tributaries of the Iberus - Ebro river), in the east part of Ribagorça. Libyca or Julia Libyca (today's Llivia) was their main centre. North of the Ilergetes and the Bergistani.
- Contestani - South of the Sucro (Xúquer) river and north of the Thader (Segura) river, in an area that today is roughly part of the Alicante/Alacant, Valencia, Murcia and Albacete provinces. A tribal confederation. East of the Bastetani. Centres included Saetabi (modern Xàtiva) and la Bastida de les Alcusses.
  - Deitani - in and around Ilici territory (today's Elx/Elche)
- Edetani - North of the Sucro (Xúquer/Júcar) river and south of the Millars river, roughly in today's Valencia province. One of the biggest iberian tribes or tribal confederations. Edeta (Roman times Lauro, today's Lliria), to the northwest of Valencia, was their main centre, Arse (Saguntum in Roman times, today's Sagunto/Sagunt) was also in their territory. North of the Contestani and the Bastetani and south of the Ilercavones.
- Elisyces/Helisyces - a tribe that dwelt in the region of Narbo (Narbonne) and modern northern Roussillon. May have been either Iberian or Ligurian or a Ligurian-Iberian tribe.
- Ilercavones - in the low Iberus (Ebro) river basin to the Millars river along the mediterranean coast and to the inland towards the Sierra de Gúdar, in Ilercavonia. One of the biggest iberian tribes or tribal confederations. Hibera (Roman time Dertusa or Dertosa, modern time Tortosa) was their main centre. North of the Edetani, south of the Ilergetes, east of the Sedetani and west of the Cessetani.
- Ilergetes/Ilergetae - in the plains area of the middle and low Segre and Cinca rivers towards the Iberus (Ebro) river margins. One of the biggest iberian tribes or tribal confederations. Iltrida (Ilerda in Roman times, today's Lérida/Lleida) was their main centre.
- Indigetes/Indigetae - in the low Ter river basin, East Pyrenees southern slopes, they occupied the far north east area of the Iberian Peninsula known as Hispania Tarraconensis, in the gulf of Empodrae (Empúries) and Rhoda (Roses), stretching up into the Pyrenees though the regions of Empordà, Selva and perhaps as far as Gironès, in what is roughly today's Girona Province. Indika/Indiga or Undika was their main centre (identified with the ruins of Ullastret). A confederation was formed by four tribes.
- Lacetani - in the middle Llobregat river basin and surrounding hills. Northwest of the Laietani.
- Laietani - in the low Llobregat river basin, along a part of the mediterranean coast roughly in what is today a part of the Barcelona province and Barcelona city. Laieta (Barcino in Roman times and Barcelona in modern times) was their main centre.
- Oretani - In the high Baetis (Guadalquivir) river valley, eastern Marianus Mons (Sierra Morena) and southern area of today's La Mancha. They could have been an Iberian tribe, a Celtic one, or a mixed Celtic and Iberian tribe or tribal confederacy (and hence related to the Celtiberians). The Mantesani/Mentesani/Mantasani of today's La Mancha and the Germani (of Oretania) in eastern Marianus Mons (Sierra Morena) and west Jabalón river valley, sometimes are included in the Oretani but it is not certain if they were Oretani tribes.
- Sedetani - south of the Iberus (Ebro) river and west of the Guadalope river, roughly in the middle basin of the Iberus (Ebro). Salduie (Roman time Salduba and Caesaraugusta and modern time Zaragoza) was in their territory. May have been more closely related to the Edetani. West of the Ilercavones.
- Sordones - in the Roussillon territory (Pyrénées Orientales Department, France), Ruscino (today's Château-Roussillon near Perpignan) was their main centre.
- Vescetani/Oscenses - In today's northern Aragon, east of Gállego river, in Sobrarbe, in and around Bolskan, later Osca (Huesca), and high Cinca River valley, Spain. They could also be related to the Vascones and therefore be related to the Aquitani speaking the Aquitanian language.
- Unknown named tribe or tribes in the Balearic Islands (formed by the Pityusic Islands and Gymnesian islands), may have been Iberians.

=== Iberian language ===
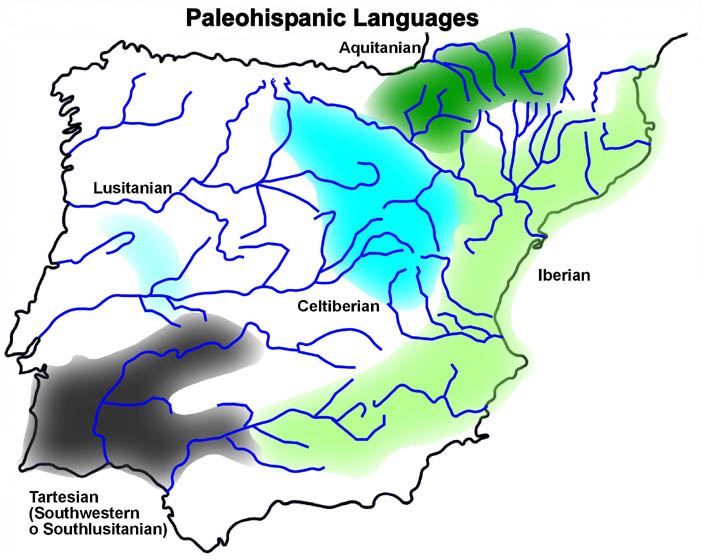
Paleohispanic languages according to inscriptions (except Aquitanian – according to anthroponyms and theonyms used in Latin inscriptions)

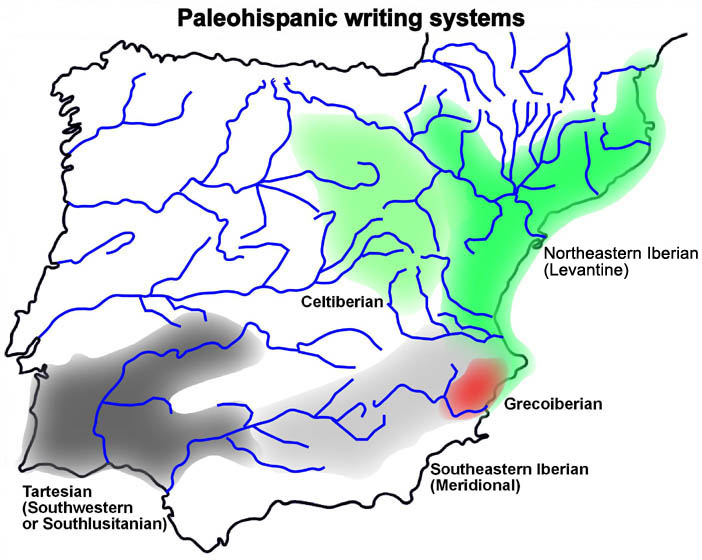
Iberian scripts in the context of paleohispanic scripts

The Iberian was a Paleohispanic language documented in writing primarily in the northeastern Iberian script, and occasionally in the southeastern Iberian script, and the Grecoiberian alphabet. The oldest inscriptions in this language date to the late 5th century BC, and the most recent ones—a Roma funerary stele from Requena (València)—to the late first or early second century AD, featuring an Iberian graffito of eight signs on its front face.

Texts in the Iberian language can be read thanks to the decipherment of the script by Manuel Gómez-Moreno in the 1920s, but for the most part they remain incomprehensible, since Iberian is a language with no sufficiently close relatives from its era that are understood well enough to have been useful for translating texts.

Over the years since its decipherment, there have been a series of slow advances that, although modest, already allow a glimpse into understanding short inscriptions—mainly funerary or ownership marks on instrumenta—as well as inferring some grammatical or typological features.

=== Iberian scripts ===
The Iberians used three different scripts to represent the Iberian language.

- Northeastern Iberian script
  - Dual variant (4th century BC and 3rd century BC)
  - Non-dual variant (2nd century BC and 1st century BC)
- Southeastern Iberian script
- Greco-Iberian alphabet

Northeastern Iberian script and southeastern Iberian script share a common distinctive typological characteristic, also present in other paleohispanic scripts: they use signs with syllabic value for the occlusives and signs with monophonemic value for the rest of the consonants and vowels. As writing systems, they are neither alphabets nor syllabaries, but mixed scripts that normally are identified as semi-syllabaries. There is no agreement between researchers concerning the origin of the Iberian writing systems: for some they are only linked to the Phoenician alphabet while for others the Greek alphabet had an influence too.

== See also ==
- Pre-Roman peoples of the Iberian Peninsula
- Iberian language
- Iberian scripts
- Ancient Iberian coinage
