= Santiago de Compostela derailment =

2013 train crash in Galicia, Spain

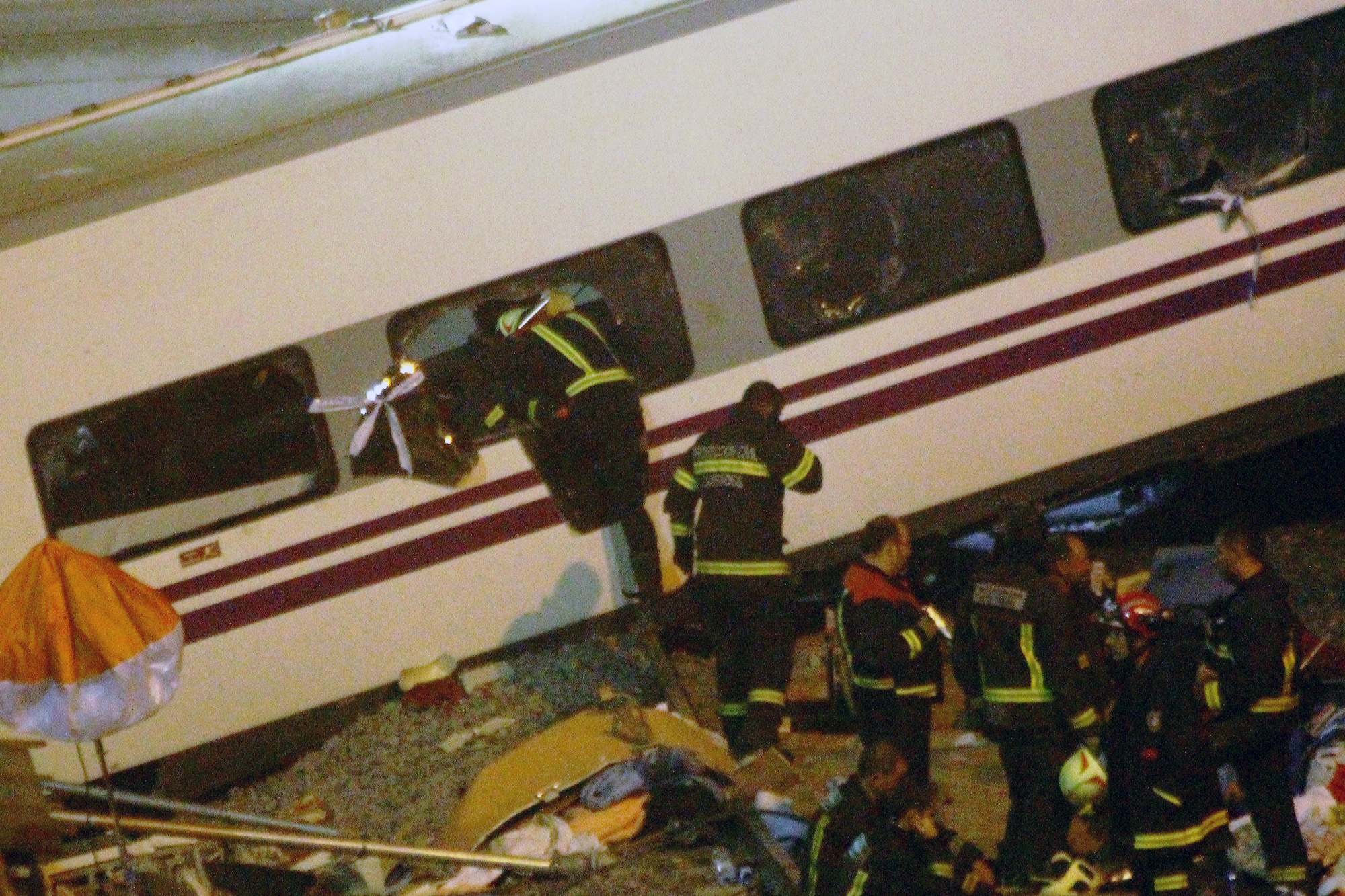
- Rescue efforts on 24 July 2013

Details
- Date: 24 July 2013; 20:41 CEST (UTC+02:00)
- Location: Angrois, Santiago de Compostela, Galicia, Spain; 3.2 km (2.0 mi) SE from Santiago de Compostela
- Coordinates: 42°51′34.2″N 8°31′40″W
- Country: Spain
- Line: Madrid–Galicia high-speed rail line
- Operator: Renfe
- Incident type: Derailment
- Cause: Overspeed on curve

Statistics
- Trains: 1
- Passengers: 218
- Crew: 4
- Deaths: 79
- Injured: 143
- Damage: Eight carriages, one dining car, two generator cars, two locomotives

On 24 July 2013, an Alvia high-speed train travelling from Madrid to Ferrol, in the north-west of Spain, derailed at high speed on a bend about 4 kilometres (2.5 mi) outside the railway station at Santiago de Compostela. Of the 178 people injured, the final number of deaths had reached 79.

The train's data recorder showed that it had been travelling at over twice the posted speed limit of 80 kilometres per hour (50 mph) when it entered a curve on the track. The crash was recorded on a track-side camera that shows all 13 train cars derailing and four overturning. On 28 July 2013, the train's driver, Francisco José Garzón Amo, was charged with 79 counts of homicide by professional recklessness and an undetermined number of counts of causing injury by professional recklessness.

The crash was Spain's worst rail accident in over 40 years, since a crash near El Cuervo, Seville, in 1972.^{[note 1]} It is also the second-deadliest high-speed train accident in history, after the 1998 Eschede train disaster in Germany.

== Background ==
Spain has one of the world's most extensive high-speed railway (HSR) networks, built and maintained by the state-owned infrastructure company Adif and run by the operator Renfe, which is also a state-owned company that manages the rolling stock.

The RENFE Class 730 passenger train is in service on this line, as it can run on both conventional and high-speed tracks. The Class 730 also has two generator cars that allow its electric traction motors to function on non-electrified lines, but that brings its weight per axle well over the normal value for high speed trains.

== Derailment ==
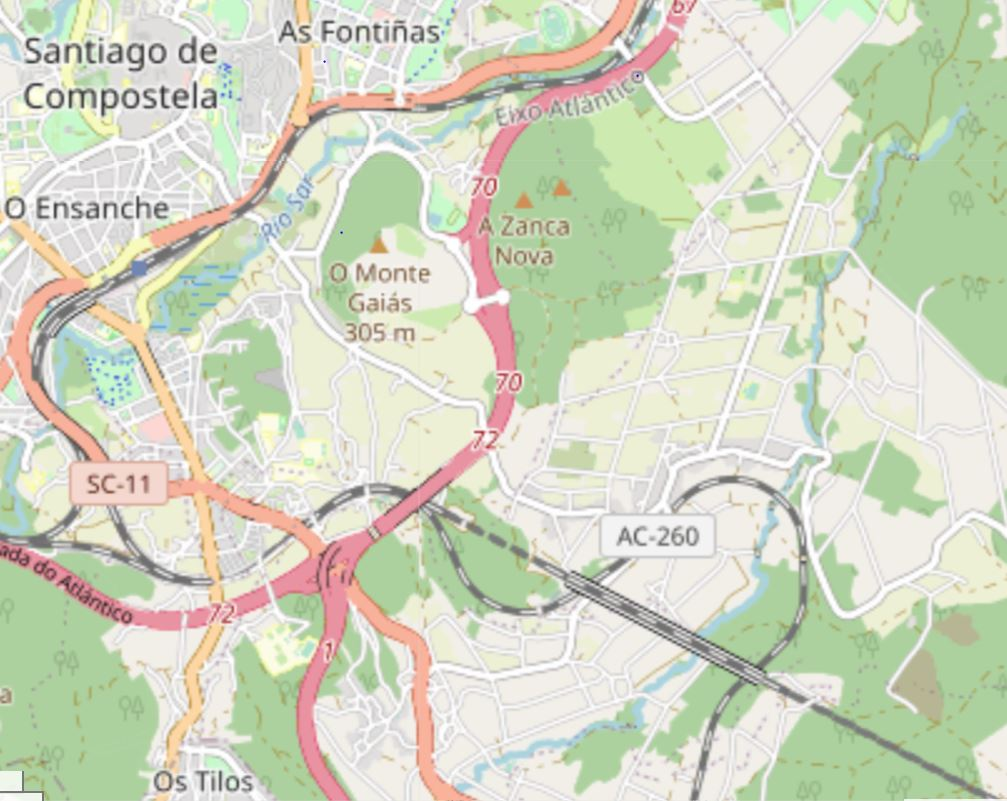
Map of rail lines showing the straight high-speed line from the south-east merging with the classic rail network on a tight 80 km/h curve

At 20:41 CEST (18:41 UTC) on 24 July 2013, the passenger train, on an express route from Madrid to Ferrol, derailed on a section of conventional track at the end of the Olmedo-Zamora-Galicia line, at Angrois in Santiago de Compostela. All vehicles – the two power cars, their adjacent generator cars (both with diesel tanks) at both ends of the train and the nine intermediate carriages – derailed as the train rounded the A Grandeira curve; four cars overturned. A track-side CCTV camera video indicates that the front generator car was the first to leave the rails, followed by the leading passenger coaches, the front power car, the rear generator car and finally the rear power car. Three of the carriages were torn apart in the accident and another caught fire due to gaseous leaking diesel fuel. The rear generator car also caught fire.

Security camera footage showing the derailment

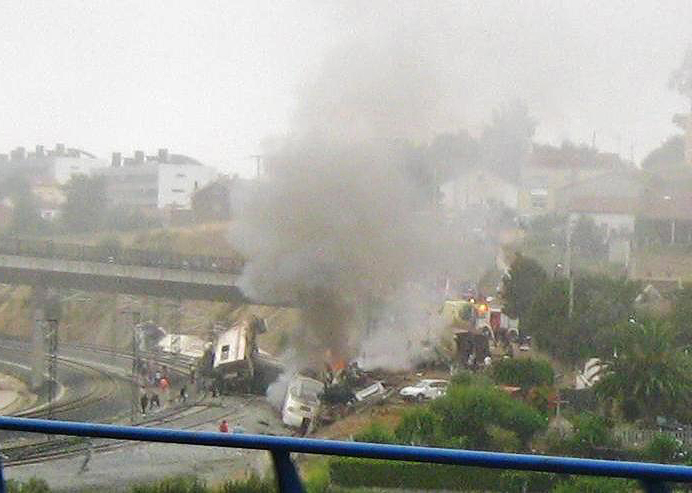
The aftermath of the derailment

== Casualties and damage ==
Deaths by citizenship
Citizenship	Deaths
Spain	67
France	2
Italy	2
United States	2
Algeria	1
Brazil	1
Colombia	1
Dominican Republic	1
Mexico	1
Venezuela	1
Total	79

The train was carrying 218 passengers at the time of the crash. Out of the 218 passengers, there were 79 fatalities (at one point reported as 80 due to a misidentification of some remains) and the remaining 139 were injured. Among the dead there were twelve foreigners. One of the victims was Spanish journalist Enrique Beotas. All four of the crew, including the train's two drivers, were injured but survived.

== Reaction ==
The regional government leader, Alberto Núñez Feijóo, remarked, "There are bodies lying on the railway track. It's a Dante-esque scene". About 320 Spanish national police were dispatched to the scene of the accident. Festivities planned for 25 July, which is a regional holiday, were cancelled.

Prime Minister Mariano Rajoy called an emergency ministerial meeting, saying, "I want to express my affection and solidarity with the victims of the terrible train accident in Santiago." On 25 July, Rajoy visited the area and declared three days of national mourning. King Juan Carlos and Queen Sofía visited injured survivors in hospital at Santiago de Compostela.

On 9 August, the Spanish government announced that there would be a nationwide review of all railway lines, their signalling and the route knowledge of train drivers.

== Investigation ==
The Comisión de Investigación de Accidentes Ferroviarios is responsible for the investigation of railway accidents in Spain. A government spokesperson said that all signs pointed to the Santiago de Compostela derailment being an accident and said there was no evidence that terrorism was a factor.

Eyewitnesses said the train was travelling at high speed before derailing. This was confirmed by data from the train's black box, which revealed that 250 m (820 ft) before the start of the curve the train was travelling at 195 km/h (121 mph), and in spite of the emergency brakes being applied was still travelling at 179 km/h (111 mph) when it derailed four seconds later. In court the train's driver, Garzón Amo, stated that the train was travelling at 180–190 km/h (110–120 mph) at the time of the accident. That was more than double the speed limit for that curve, which is 80 km/h (50 mph).

Multiple media outlets reported that, in 2012, a year before the accident, Garzón Amo had boasted on his personal Facebook page about the high speeds his trains would travel. One Facebook posting, reported by Spanish media, attributed to Garzón Amo, stated: "It would be amazing to go alongside police and overtake them and trigger off the speed camera", accompanied by a photo of a train's speedometer clocking 200 km/h (124 mph). A follow-up comment attributed to Garzón Amo reads: "Ha ha ha, that would be a lovely fine for Renfe." However, these speeds are normal and fully permitted on the high-speed line sections.

The bend where the accident happened is the first curve reached by a Santiago-bound train coming from Ourense after an 80-kilometre (50 mi) stretch of high-speed track where 200 km/h (124 mph) is permitted. The high-speed track has ERTMS-compliant signalling, which is designed to slow or stop a train whose driver is ignoring signals or the speed limits. However, the new high-speed line joins a conventional track shared with low-speed trains, at the curve where the accident happened. The system did not include a control to make the train slow to the speed limit for the low-speed line before entering it. The conventional track only had the older ASFA signalling system, which will warn drivers if they are exceeding speed limits, but will not automatically slow or stop a speeding train. There is a different system capable of stopping a train if it passes a red signal but that was irrelevant in this case. Part of the investigation into the incident focused on whether any of these speed monitoring systems failed and why the originally built-in safety system ETCS/ERTMS had been disconnected.

Garzón Amo was detained pending a criminal investigation, according to a spokeswoman for the Court of Justice of Galicia regional supreme court. Garzón told the investigating magistrate, Luis Alaez, that he suffered a "lapse of concentration" as he approached the curve when the train should have been slowed to 80 km per hour.

On 28 July 2013, Garzón Amo was charged with 79 counts of homicide by professional recklessness and an undetermined number of counts of causing injury by professional recklessness. Further charges were brought against safety director Andres Maria Cortabitarte in 2017 for "crimes of homicide and injuries through serious negligence".

Court investigators said that the driver was speaking on the telephone to staff at Renfe about the route to Ferrol, and consulting a map or document, shortly before the brakes were activated and that he did apply the brakes, but not in time to achieve the safe speed limit for the curve.

== Corrective actions ==
In the immediate aftermath of the accident, the Spanish rail authority Adif installed three ASFA ("Automatic Braking and Announcement of Signals" in English) balises on 1.9 km of the approach to Santiago de Compostela to enforce speed limits of 160, 60 and 30 km/h, to prevent trains from reaching or maintaining a speed that would cause a similar derailment.

== Trial ==
A day after the accident, the presiding judge of Santiago de Compostela's Court of Instruction No. 3, Luis Aláez, ordered the Judicial Police to question the train driver, Francisco José Garzón Amo, as a defendant. Represented by a lawyer from QBE, Renfe's insurer, Garzón exercised his right to remain silent during the police questioning. On July 28, 2013, he testified before the judge in Santiago, admitting human error, stating that he braked too late after mistakenly thinking he was in another section of the track. According to judicial sources, he refrained from blaming the track layout, infrastructure conditions, or the train's state.

In April 2014, Judge Andrés Lago Louro replaced Aláez and took over the case. By October 2015, the judge closed the investigation with the train driver as the sole defendant, charged with 80 counts of gross negligence leading to homicide and 144 counts of gross negligence leading to injuries.

In May 2016, the Provincial Court of La Coruña ordered the case to be reopened to investigate whether there were additional responsibilities related to the safety of the Santiago-Ourense high-speed rail line. In March 2017, Andrés María Cortabitarte López, Director of Safety at Adif, was indicted. By October 2017, Antonio Lanchares Asensio, Director of Safety at Renfe, was also called to testify as a defendant. That same year, the judge extended the investigation period by another 18 months.

By December 2018, the judge closed the investigation, with the train driver and Adif's Director of Safety, Andrés Cortabitarte, as the only defendants. In April 2021, the Provincial Court of La Coruña finalized the case, dismissing appeals and paving the way for a large-scale trial.

The trial began in October 2022 at the City of Culture of Galicia due to the large number of involved parties. The prosecution sought four years in prison for the train driver and Adif's Director of Safety, accusing them of 80 counts of homicide, 145 of injury, and one of property damage, all due to gross professional negligence. The presiding judge was Elena Fernández Currás, from Santiago de Compostela’s Court of Penal No. 2. The trial concluded in July 2023.

=== Verdict ===
On 26 July 2024, the court delivered its verdict, sentencing train driver Francisco José Garzón to 2 years, 6 months, and 1 day in prison for 79 counts of gross negligence leading to homicide and 143 counts of gross negligence leading to injury. He was also banned from working as a railway operator for 4 years, 6 months, and 1 day. Similarly, Adif's Director of Safety, Andrés Cortabitarte, received the same sentence and professional disqualification.

The court also ordered Renfe Operadora's insurer, QBE, and Adif's insurer, Allianz Global, to pay €10,064,240 in compensation to the 134 injured victims who had filed claims.

== See also ==
- Eschede train disaster (1998), the world's worst ever high-speed rail disaster.
- Salisbury rail crash (1906), a LSWR boat train from Plymouth's Friary railway station to London Waterloo station failed to navigate a very sharp curve at the eastern end of Salisbury railway station.
- Amagasaki rail crash (2005), a suburban train crash that occurred on a curve at high speed.
- Eckwersheim derailment (2015), a similar incident in France that occurred when a high-speed train entered a curve at excessive speed during commissioning tests of a new high-speed line
- Valencia Metro derailment (2006)
- Adamuz rail disaster (2026)
- List of rail accidents (2010–2019)
- List of rail accidents in Spain

== Notes ==
1. The 2004 Madrid train bombings, which killed 191 people, were an act of terrorism, not an accident.
