= Chinchilla train collision =

2003 train collision in Spain

Coordinates: 38.8883°N 1.6943°W

Details
- Date: 3 June 2003; 21:40
- Location: Chinchilla de Montearagón, Spain
- Country: Spain
- Operator: RENFE
- Incident type: Train collision
- Cause: Human error

Statistics
- Trains: 2
- Deaths: 19
- Injured: 50

The Chinchilla train collision occurred on 3 June 2003, when a passenger train and a freight train collided on the Cartagena-Albacete line in the Castilian-Manchego municipality of Chinchilla de Monte-Aragón, Albacete, Spain. The accident, caused by both trains mistakenly being put on the same track, resulted in 19 deaths and around 50 wounded.

== Victims ==
Initially, it was estimated that 16 people were dead (five engineers from the two trains involved) along with 10 missing and 39 wounded. After the rescue, it was found that a total of 19 people were killed and 65 others injured.

== Judicial process ==
Station master José Luis D. C. was convicted in 2006 of 19 counts of professional reckless homicide and 48 counts of professional reckless injury. He was sentenced to two years of prison and four years of absolute disqualification (which disqualifies a convict from holding public office or employment, and disallows a convict to obtain government grants, scholarships, or any public aid).
