= Cessetani =

Ancient people of the Iberian Peninsula

The Iberian Peninsula in the 3rd century BC

Location map of the pre-Roman people of Cessetani in Iberian Peninsula

The Cessetani were an ancient Iberian (Pre-Roman) people of the Iberian Peninsula (the Roman Hispania). They are believed to have spoken the Iberian language. Their territory extended along the coast between the Coll de Balaguer and the Garraf Massif and was limited in the west by the Prades Mountains.

== History ==
One of their main cities was Tarraco, modern day Tarragona. Although there are no remains visible of the Cessetani civilization, you can visit the Roman remains of a theater, a stadium and a Roman city wall. The Roman ruins of Tarraco are also listed on Unesco. Tarraco was captured by the Romans in 218 BC, after the Battle of Cissa, in which Gnaeus Cornelius Scipio triumphed over the Carthaginians during the beginning of the Second Punic War.

== Culture ==
The Cessetani minted their own coins, almost ever only with the name of one of their main cities, kese, but a few bore the inscription kesesken in northeastern Iberian script that is interpreted in Iberian language as a self-reference to the ethnic name of that people: from the Cessetani or from those of kese.

== See also ==
- Iberians
- Pre-Roman peoples of the Iberian Peninsula
