= Church of Santa María del Salvador (Chinchilla de Montearagón) =

- Iglesia Arciprestal de Santa María del Salvador (Spanish)
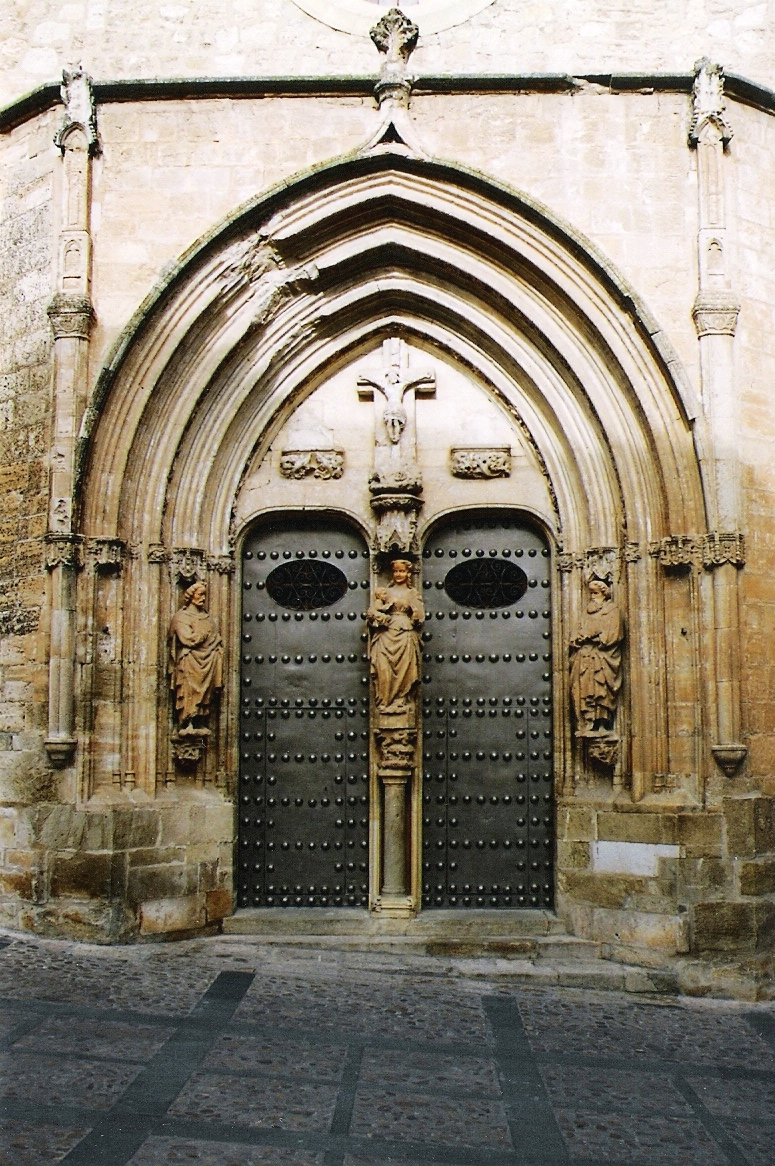

- Location within Spain
- 38.921051°N 1.725251°W
- Location: Chinchilla de Monte-Aragón, Spain

Spanish Cultural Heritage
- Official name: Iglesia Arciprestal de Santa María del Salvador
- Type: Non-movable
- Criteria: Monument
- Designated: 1922
- Reference no.: RI-51-0000235

The Church of Santa María del Salvador (Spanish: Iglesia Arciprestal de Santa María del Salvador) is a Roman Catholic church located in Chinchilla de Monte-Aragón, Spain. It was declared Bien de Interés Cultural in 1922.

Construction of the church, using designs by Juan Pacheco, Marqués de Villena, began in the 15th century. The church however has multiple styles, including a gothic portal, renaissance façade, and baroque interiors. The 16th-century metalwork by Antón de Viveros, races the main chapel.
