= Castle of Chinchilla =

- Castillo de Chinchilla (Spanish)
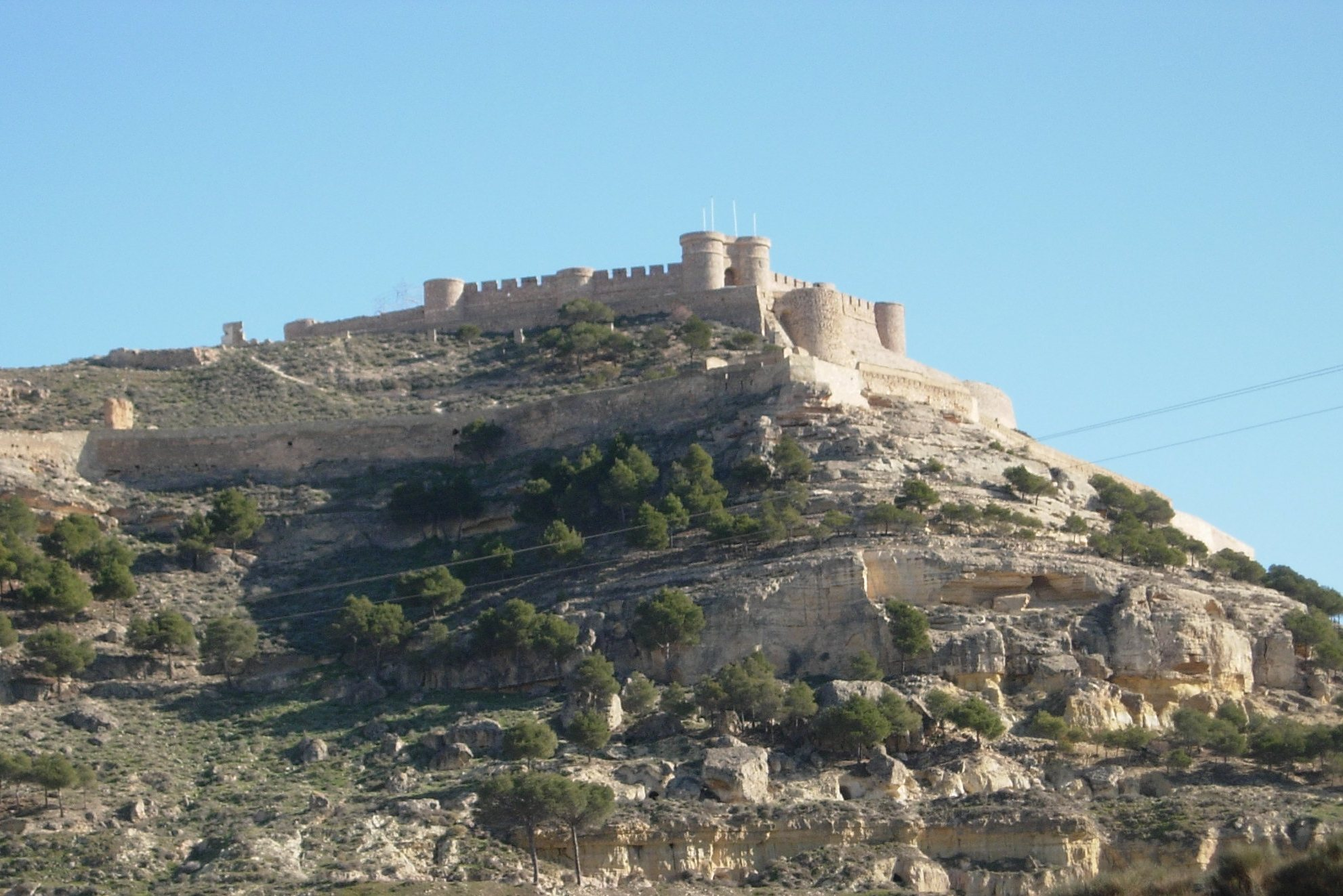

- Location within Spain
- 38.918894°N 1.728525°W
- Location: Chinchilla de Monte-Aragón, Spain

Spanish Cultural Heritage
- Official name: Castillo de Chinchilla
- Type: Non-movable
- Criteria: Monument
- Designated: 1931
- Reference no.: RI-51-0000363

The Castle of Chinchilla (Spanish: Castillo de Chinchilla) is a castle located in Chinchilla de Monte-Aragón, Spain. It was declared Bien de Interés Cultural in 1931. As of right now visitors only have access to see the exterior of the castle as the interior is under construction. Visitors to the castle can see the remains of Iberian and Roman architecture.

== Description ==
The Castle of Chinchilla, known by Muslims as Ghenghalet, is a castle built upon an Arab fortification in the 18th century. Hired by the Marquis of Villena, Juan Pacheco built the castle with many influences from multiple cultures of architecture (fortified). The castle was built by masonry walls that are 10 meters wide and 6 meters deep. The architecture has Arab influences, including elbow entrances, albarrana towers, and underground galleries with intakes of water. It includes a moat that is 16 meters deep, and many towers including one of great infamy, Torre del Homenaje.

== History (Important Years) ==
1242: Re-conquered from the Muslims, led by the Commander of Ucles, Pelayo Pérez Correa, with an army formed by Christians from the kingdoms of Castile and Aragon.

End of the 13th century: Important buildings appear such as the convent of San Juan of the Dominican order, the Church of El Salvador and that of Santa María in the current Plaza de La Mancha.

14th century: Chinchilla became part of the Señorío de Villena under the mandate of Don Juan Manuel.

1422: Appointment of Chinchilla as a city by King Juan II

1448: Beginning of the construction of the current castle in this year by Juan Pacheco

1504: Cesare Borgia imprisoned in Tower of Tribute

1576: Evidence of the construction by Juan Pacheco can be found in the coat of arms on the walls and in a topographical survey from 1576 which states: “This tower, fortifications and moat were made by the Marquis of Villena”.

1812: The castle suffered interior and exterior damages by the French troops during the Independence war

1900: The city council wanted to turn the castle into a prison causing to remove all remaining interior that was left behind by the French troops

1973: The town council got the castle back and destroyed the prison which was abandoned for 27 years (Fortified)

== Locations ==
Chinchilla de Montearagón

== Important People ==
Cesar Borgia

Juan Pacheco

Marquis of Villena

King Juan II

Don Juan Manuel

== Bibliography ==
- Ayuntamiento de chinchilla de montearagón - castillo. Ayuntamiento de Chinchilla de Montearagón - Castillo.
- Chinchilla de montearagón castle in Chinchilla de Monte-Aragón: Spain.info in English. Spain.info
- Fortified Castle of Chinchilla de Montearagón. Spain Heritage Network.
- Spain is culture. Monuments in Albacete, Spain: Castillo de Chinchilla de Monte Aragon. Cultural tourism in Castile la Mancha, Spain.
- Visit castle of chinchilla de montearagn: TCLM. Visit Castle of Chinchilla de Montearagn | TCLM.
