= Enrique Beotas =

Spanish journalist (1955–2013)

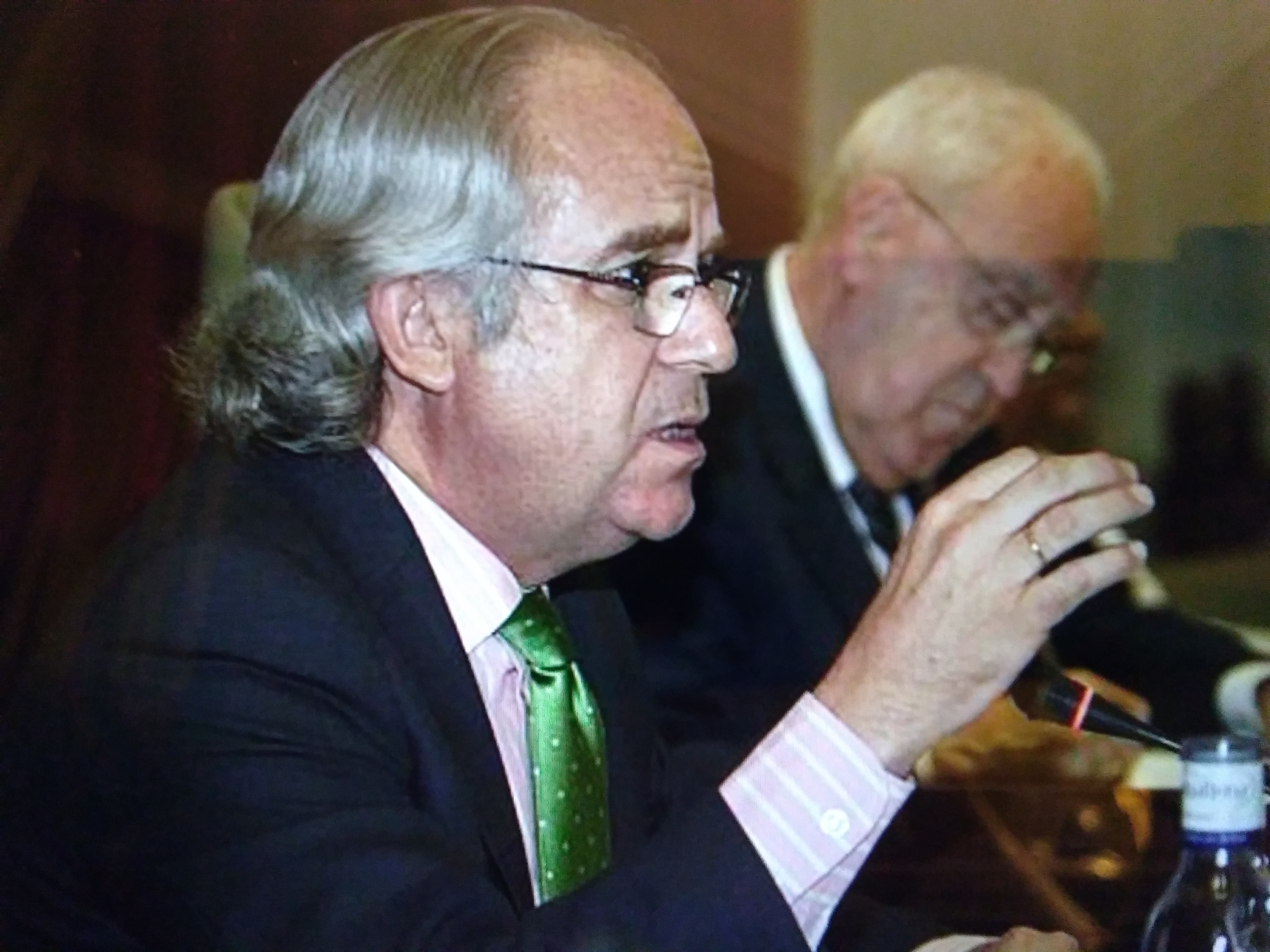
- Born: Enrique Beotas López; 1955; Ávila, Spain
- Died: 24 July 2013 (aged 57–58); Santiago de Compostela, Spain
- Education: Complutense University of Madrid
- Occupation: Journalist

Enrique Beotas López (1955 – 24 July 2013) was a Spanish journalist.

== Biography ==
He had a Degree in Journalism and Advertising from the Complutense University of Madrid. Among other positions, throughout his professional career, always around the different aspects of communication, he was General Technical Coordinator of the Municipal Tourism Board of the Madrid City Council during the mayor's office of Enrique Tierno Galván, Founder and Head of the Office of Information of People's Alliance, General Technical Coordinator of social media of the People's Party and Director of Communication of the electoral campaign of Manuel Fraga in Galicia.

He was also General Director of the corporate advertising division of YR, General Director of Capital Image, Account Director of Burson Marsteller, Director of External Relations of Antena 3, Deputy General Director of Communication and Institutional Relations of the radio group Onda Cero, Director of Relationships Institutional and Corporate of "Unidad Editorial", General Director of Institutional Relations and Corporate Responsibility of the Acciona Group, President and Founder of the Quator Group and Vice President of the "Federation of Professional Associations of Radio and Television".

He collaborated in print media such as Marca, Ya, La Información de Madrid, El Mundo, La Razón', Grupo Promecal or El Correo Gallego, as well as magazines such as Actualidad Española, Ronda Iberia or Gaceta Ilustrada, among many others.

He was the creator of La Rebotica, a socio-health radio program, with more than 20 years of success on radio stations such as: Onda Cero Radio, 'Radio España', 'Radio Voz', Cadena SER, Cadena COPE, 'Punto Radio', 'Gestiona Radio', 'Live Radio' or 'Radio Obradoiro'.

He was also the creator of Autor Autor, a radio program dedicated to Spanish creators, which in 2008, the Ministry of Culture granted the National Prize for the Promotion of Reading. He was the author and editor of the trilogy composed Por las Puertas de Madrid, Los Parques de Madrid and Madrid no te Olvida.

He authored titles such as Sonatine pour Ivette and Manuel Fraga: Cuaderno de notas de una vida. He is also co-author of Los Pasos de Canogar. Has written and edited Lamazares: Apuntes Intimimos, Modesto Seara: la mirada universal, Gerardo Fernández Albor: la elegancia del compromiso and Carlos Moor: las raíces de un sueño that in 2014 was awarded at the prestigious Gourmand Awards.

In collaboration with El Correo Gallego, where his A Modiño interviews appeared every Saturday, he published 10 volumes of the Galicia Sixth Province collection, which includes his more than 300 conversations with Galician notables spread all over the world.

He was also co-author and editor of the interview book Authors of Life. He edited three installments of Ser Extremeño, seven from Castellanos y Leoneses por Derecho, and five from Médicos de Rebotica, all of them co-authorshiped with various authors. He also edited the book Virtuosos del Fogón as well as 15 installments of the collection Cuentos de Rebotica.

== Death ==
On 24 July 2013, the train driver of an Alvia 730 train travelling to Ferrol, Galicia, from Madrid took a curve well above the posted speed limit, and derailed near Santiago de Compostela killing 79 people and injuring 143. Beotas was one of the victims.

Posthumously Beotas' latest work published, is Jose Manuel Romay Beccaria: The Permanent Equilibrium, which could not finish because of the accident. He received posthumously the Medal of Galicia, the highest medal in that region.
