= Mausoleum of Pozo Moro =

6th century BC burial site in Albacete, Spain

Coordinates: 38°50′11″N 1°41′48″W

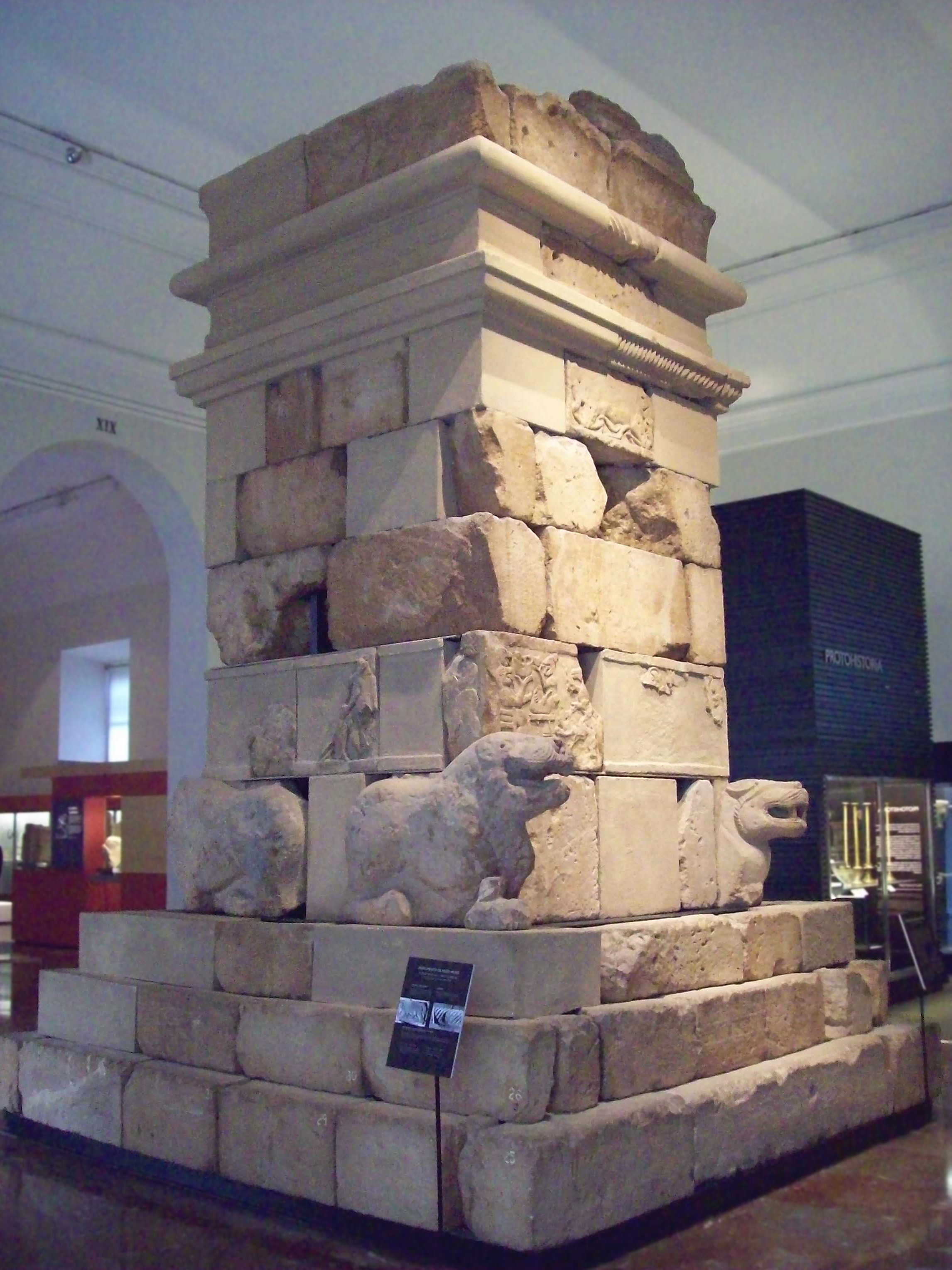
The Mausoleum of Pozo Moro in the Museo Arqueológico Nacional de España in Madrid

The Mausoleum of Pozo Moro is an Iberian mausoleum from the end of the 6th century BC, discovered in 1970 in excavations made in the Province of Albacete.

== Description ==
The mausoleum was found in pieces strewn over a 12 m × 12 m (39 ft × 39 ft) area in an Iberian necropolis. It has since been reconstructed in the Museo Arqueológico Nacional de España in Madrid. Erected by an Iberian king around 500 BC, the mausoleum is the oldest known Iberian grave monument. The find spots of the rectangular blocks enabled an accurate reconstruction of the structure, which must have been about 10 m (33 ft) high and have stood atop a three-level square pedestal 3.65 m (12.0 ft) wide. Four stone lions stood on the corners of the mausoleum, whose walls were decorated with reliefs depicting deities. These sculptures belong to the Orientalising period of Iberian art and are heavily influenced by Neo-Hittite and Syrian art. Levenson says archaeologists seem agreed the cultural ambiance is closely related to the Punic, that is, neo-Phoenician.

== Location ==
Pozo Moro, near the Spanish community of Chinchilla de Monte-Aragón, lies about 840 m (2,760 ft) above sea level and 125 km (78 mi) from the Mediterranean coast at the intersection of important ancient routes: the road from Carthago Nova (Cartagena) to Complutum (Alcalá de Henares) and the central Spanish plateau met the Via Heraclea (also known as the Via Augusta), which ran down the Guadalquivir to Gades (Cádiz) and along the Spanish Levante.

== Child Sacrifice ==
The tower features a relief with a vivid representation of ancient ritual child sacrifice.

The depicted scene is both intricate and chilling. At the center, a two-headed creature, resembling a human, is seated on a throne adorned with a fringed cushion. The creature's heads, one stacked atop the other, are marked by prominent eyes and extended tongues. The upper hand of this creature holds a bowl, over which the head and feet of a small individual can be seen, its gaze fixed on the creature's upper head. Meanwhile, the creature's other hand grasps the leg of an overturned pig positioned on a table before it.

Behind this table stands a man dressed in a long, fringed tunic, who offers up a small bowl. Another panel, though damaged, reveals a third individual standing opposite the creature, wielding a curved-blade sword. Intriguingly, the head of this third figure, which is only partially visible, bears resemblance to either a horse or a bull. It remains unclear if this is an actual head or a symbolic mask. The same figure's other hand is extended, appearing to touch the head of another small person placed in a bowl on a low altar next to the main table.

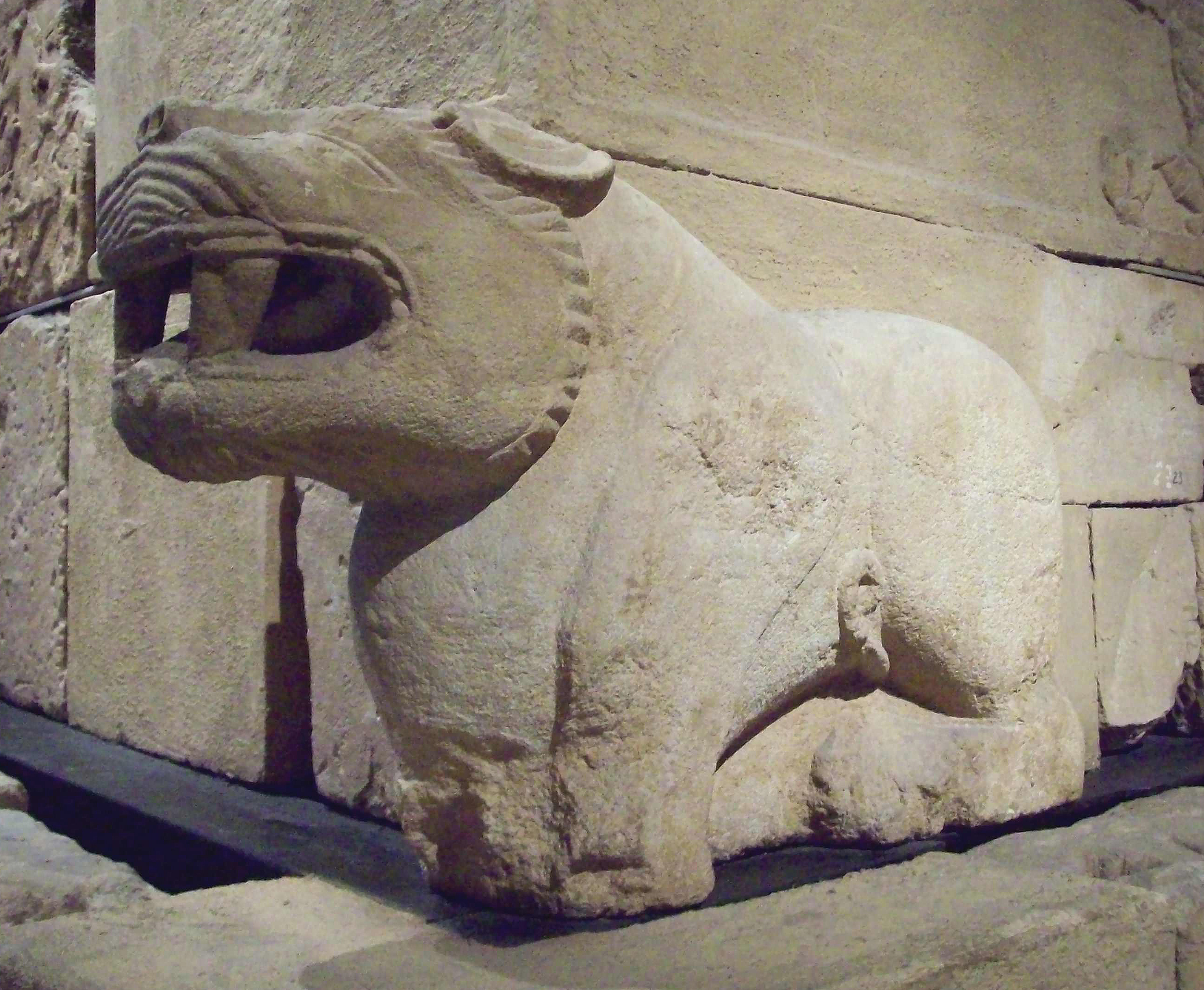
Lion

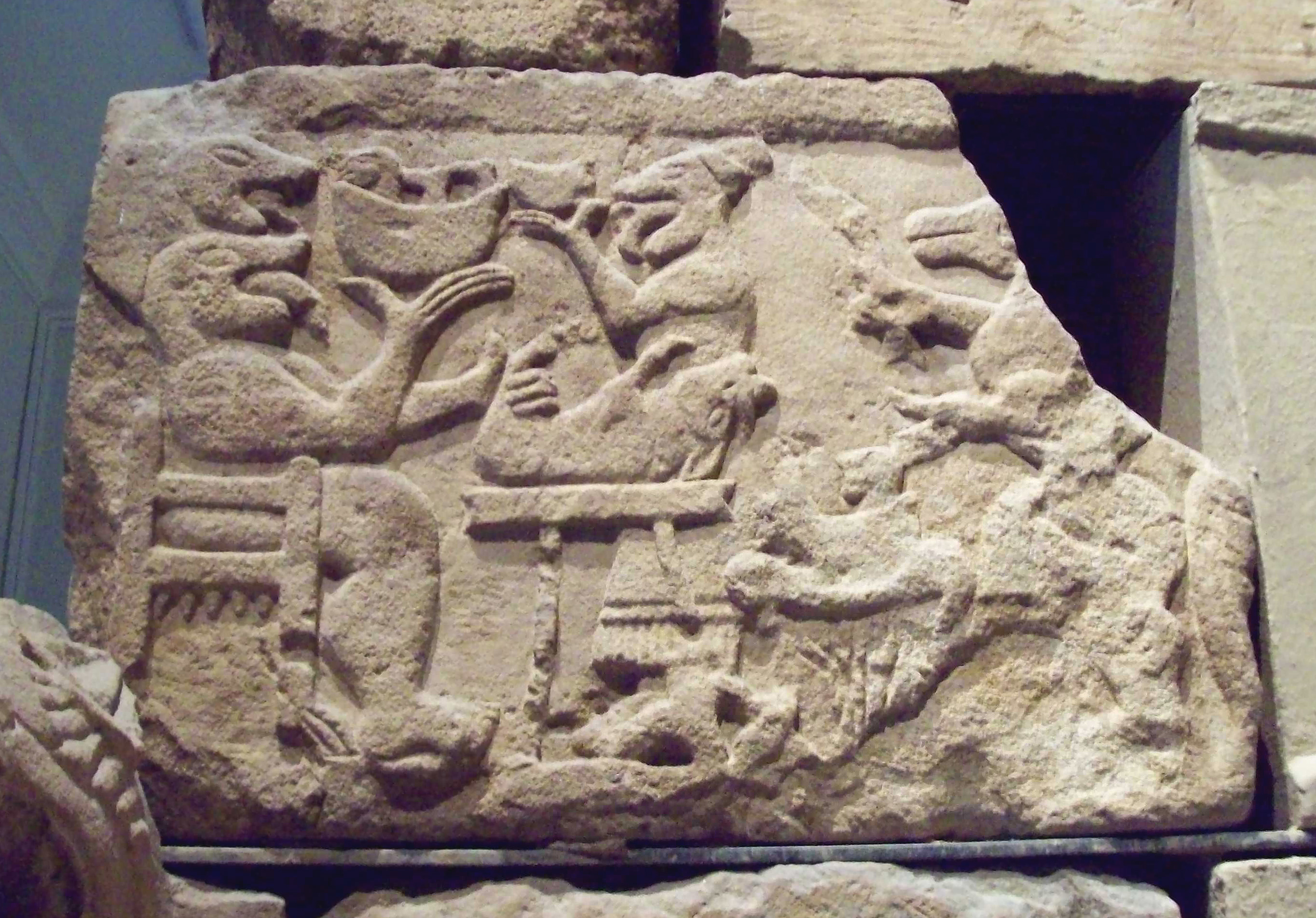
Relief

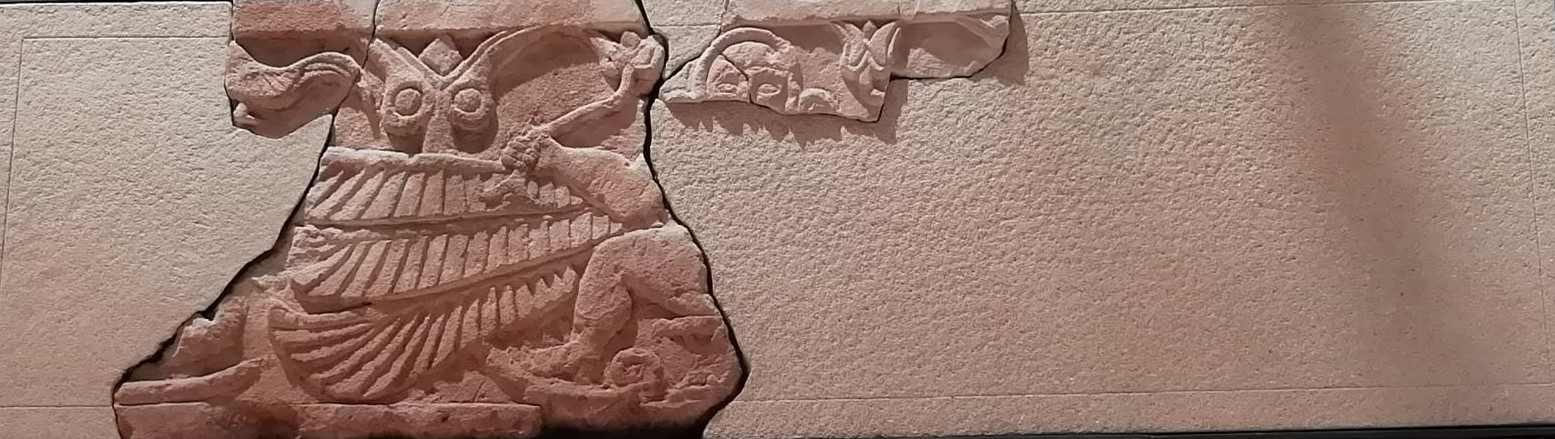
Goddess relief

== Bibliography ==
- Martín Almagro-Gorbea: Pozo Moro. In: Michael Koch (Ed.): Die Iberer (Exhibition Catalogue). Hirmer, München 1998, ISBN 3-7774-7710-9, pp. 148−149.
