= Hibera =

Ancient city

Hibera is an ancient city, known for being a strategic point from which the Second Punic War is said to have originated. It was fought over by the Carthaginians and the Romans during this period. According to the texts, most of them from Livy's History of Rome, the city was situated in the north east of the Iberian Peninsula, near the mouth of the Ebro river. After the occupation and rule of both nations the city adopted the name Dertosa.

== Archeology ==
For a long time nobody had found any trace that this city existed, with its foundations heavily concealed underground. This led to its very existence being disputed. In August 2007, archaeologists brought to light the remains of some of the city walls, dating from the 7th century BC near to the city of Tortosa. The walls provided sufficient evidence that this city existed exactly where it was written, and defended its remains from external attacks on the site.

== Latin reference ==
[P. et Cn. Scipiones] transito amne cum diu consultassent, utrum castra castris conferrent an satis haberent sociis Carthaginiensium oppugnandis morari ab itinere proposito hostem, urbem a propinquo flumine Hiberam appellatam, opulentissimam ea tempestate regionis eius, oppugnare parant. Quod ubi sensit Hasdrubal, pro ope ferenda sociis pergit ire ipse ad urbem deditam nuper in fidem Romanorum oppugnandam. Ita iam coepta obsidio omissa ab Romanis est et in ipsum Hasdrubalem versum bellum.

"After crossing the river, they [Publius and Cnaeus Scipio] long debated whether to bring their camp closer to Hasdrubal’s or whether it would suffice for them to delay the enemy’s projected march by launching attacks on Carthaginian allies. They finally prepared to attack what was at that time the richest city in the region, Hibera, which was named after the nearby river. When Hasdrubal heard about this, instead of bringing assistance to his allies, he chose rather to proceed himself with an attack on a town that had recently surrendered to the Romans. The blockade of Hibera, which had already commenced, was therefore abandoned by the Romans, whose operations were now focused directly on Hasdrubal himself."
