= Chinchilla de Montearagón =

Chinchilla de Monte-Aragón
- Municipality
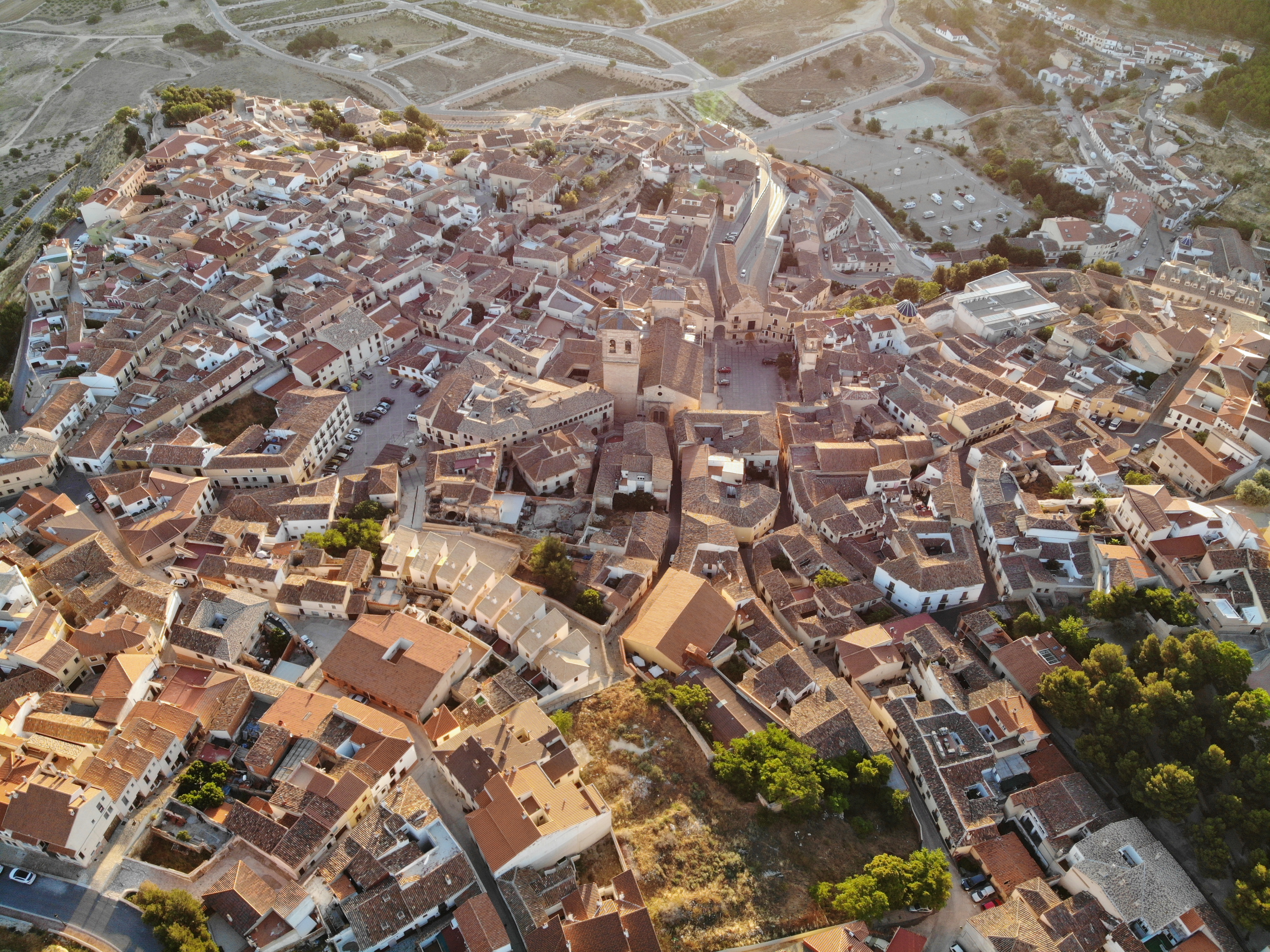

- Coat of arms

- Location in Albacete Location in Castilla-La Mancha Location in Spain
- Coordinates: 38°55′15″N 1°43′33″W
- Country: Spain
- Autonomous community: Castilla–La Mancha
- Province: Albacete

Area
  - Total: 679.27 km^{2} (262.27 sq mi)
- Elevation: 907 m (2,976 ft)

Population (2025-01-01)
  - Total: 4,614
  - Density: 6.793/km^{2} (17.59/sq mi)

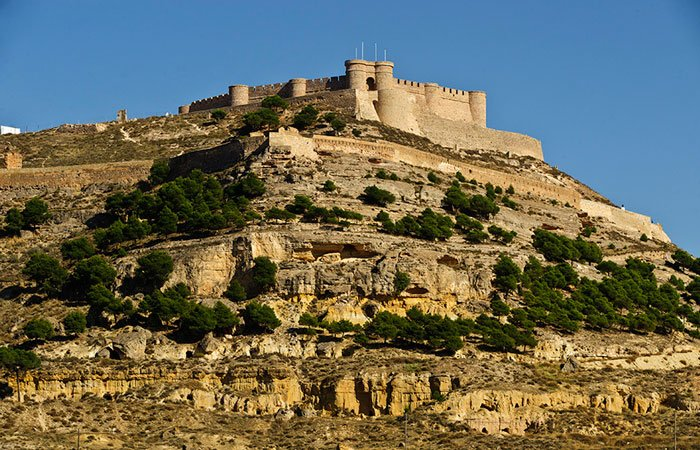

Chinchilla de Montearagón or Chinchilla de Monte-Aragón, or simply Chinchilla, is a municipality in the province of Albacete in Castile-La Mancha, Spain. Spreading across a total area of 679.27 km^{2} (262.27 sq mi), the municipality has population of 4,182 (2018).

== Description ==
This town is located 15 km from the capital of the province. In 2008, with 3,660 inhabitants, according to INE data, but according to water consumption data are estimated about 5,000 since many are not registered in this town used by many as a dormitory town of Albacete. It includes the hamlets of Casa Blanca de los Rioteros, Estación de Chinchilla, La Felipa, Horna, Pinilla, Pozo Bueno, Pozo de la Peña and El Villar de Chinchilla (wines produced in the latter parish belong to the Almansa Denominación de Origen). The Church of Santa María del Salvador stands in the town.

== Historical data ==
In the short-lived 1822 territorial division of Spain, Chinchilla was to be the provincial capital; the 1833 territorial division of Spain, which remains largely in effect today, moved the capital to Albacete.

Since 1991 the municipality has been governed by the Spanish Socialist Workers' Party (PSOE).

In 2003, two trains collided overnight, leaving 19 dead and 50 injured.

== Gallery ==
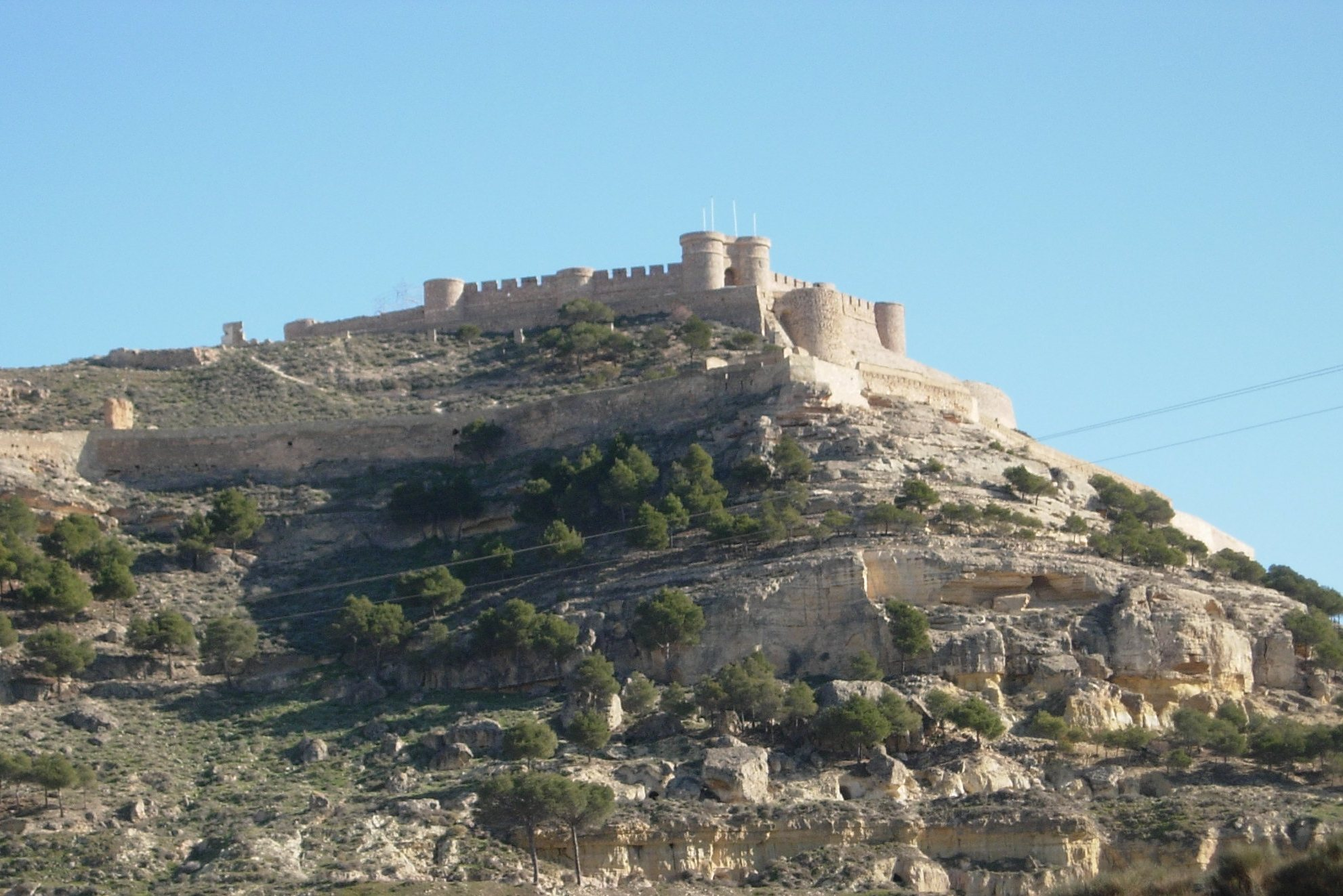
Castle of Chinchilla of Monte-Aragón

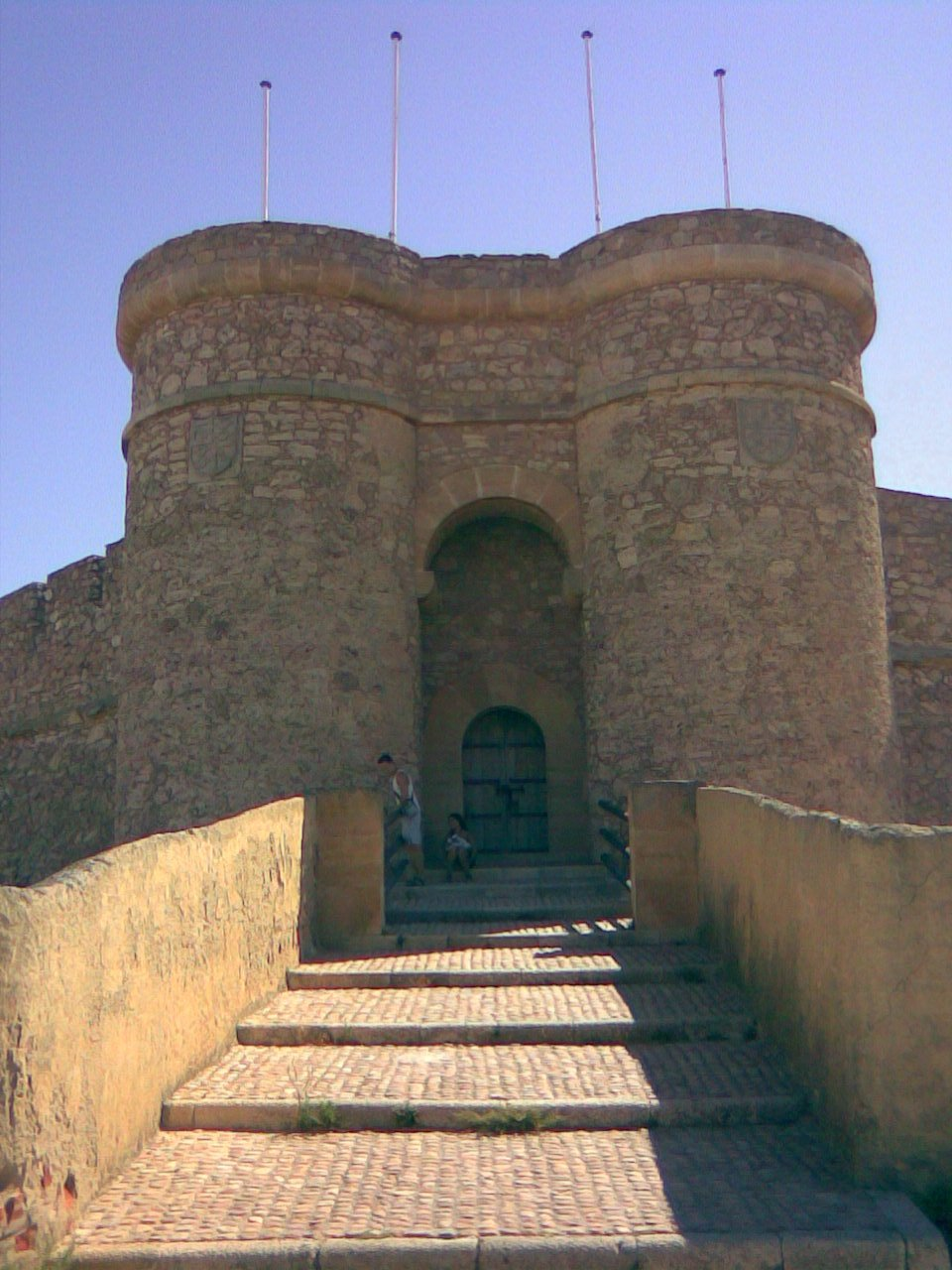
Doorway of the castle

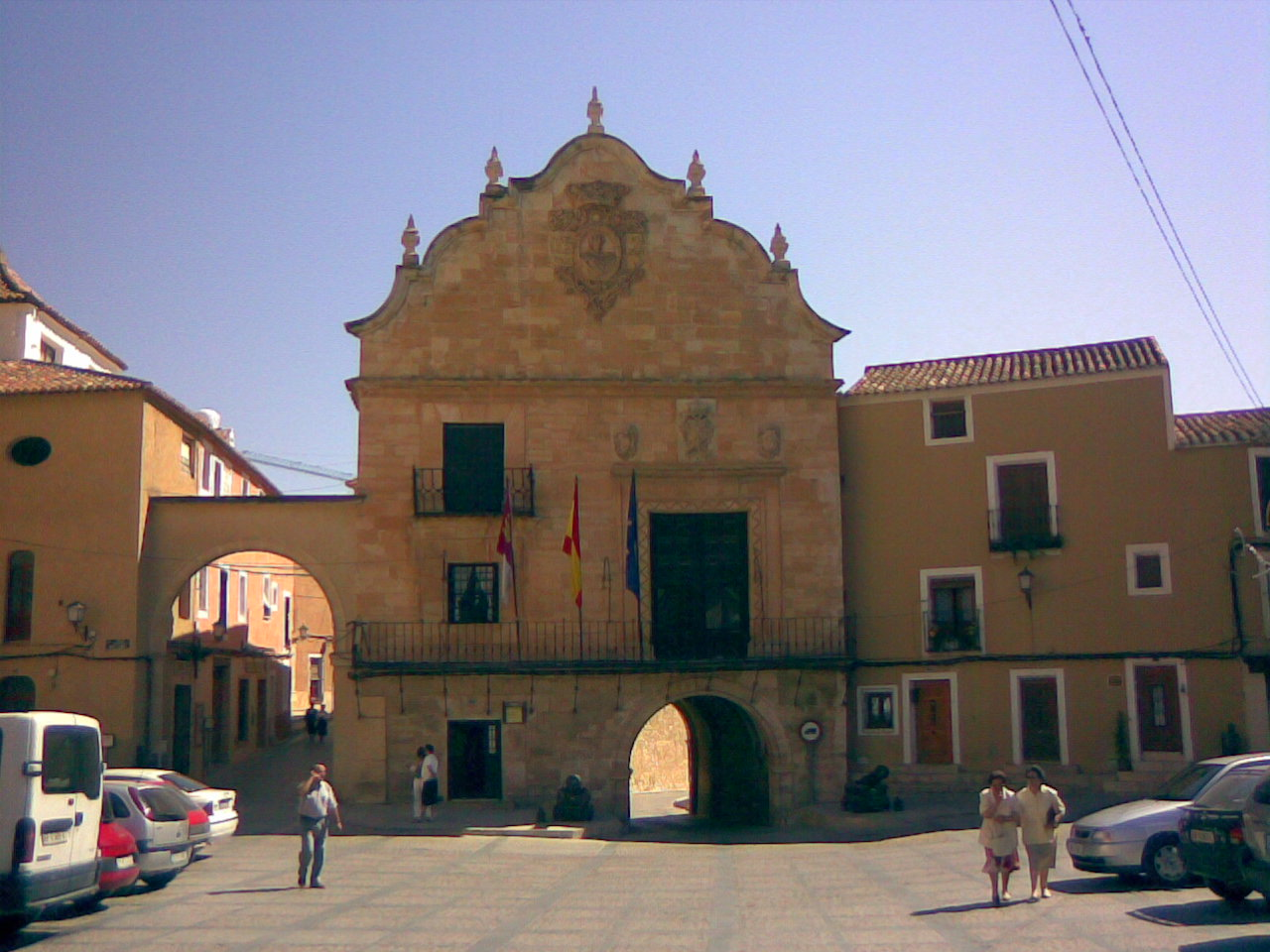
La Mancha Square

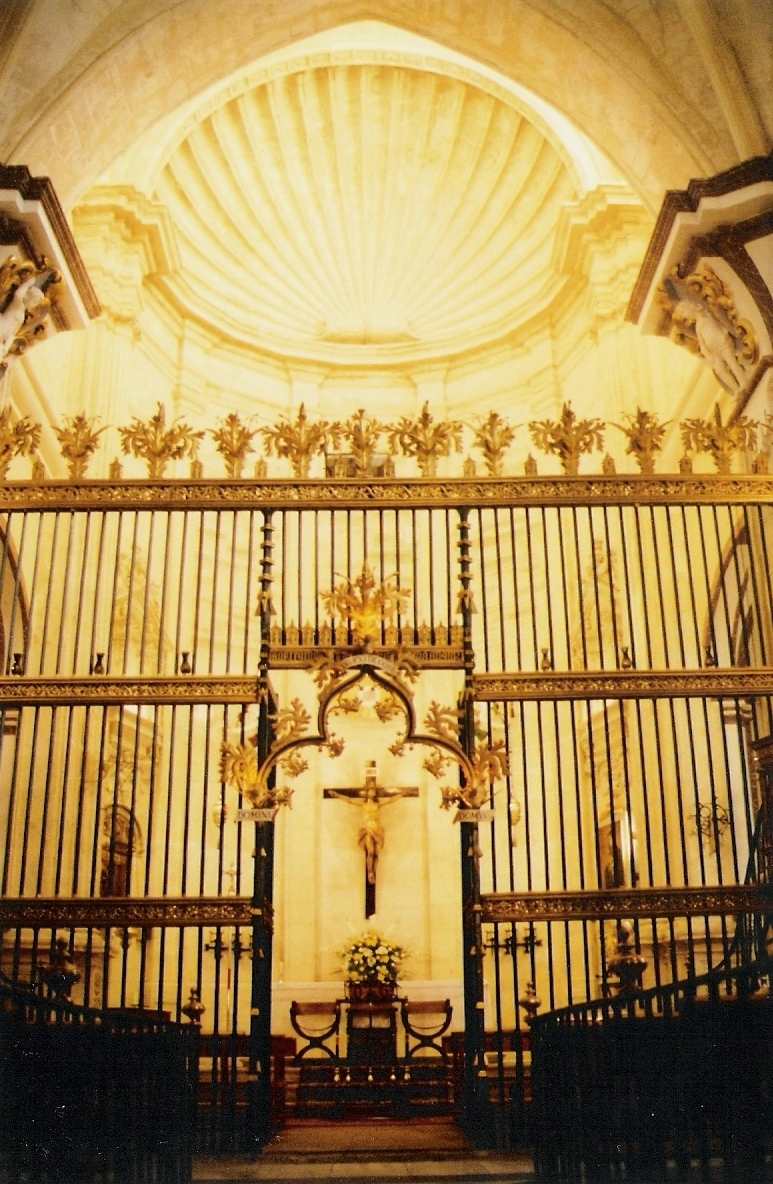
Church of Chinchilla, interior

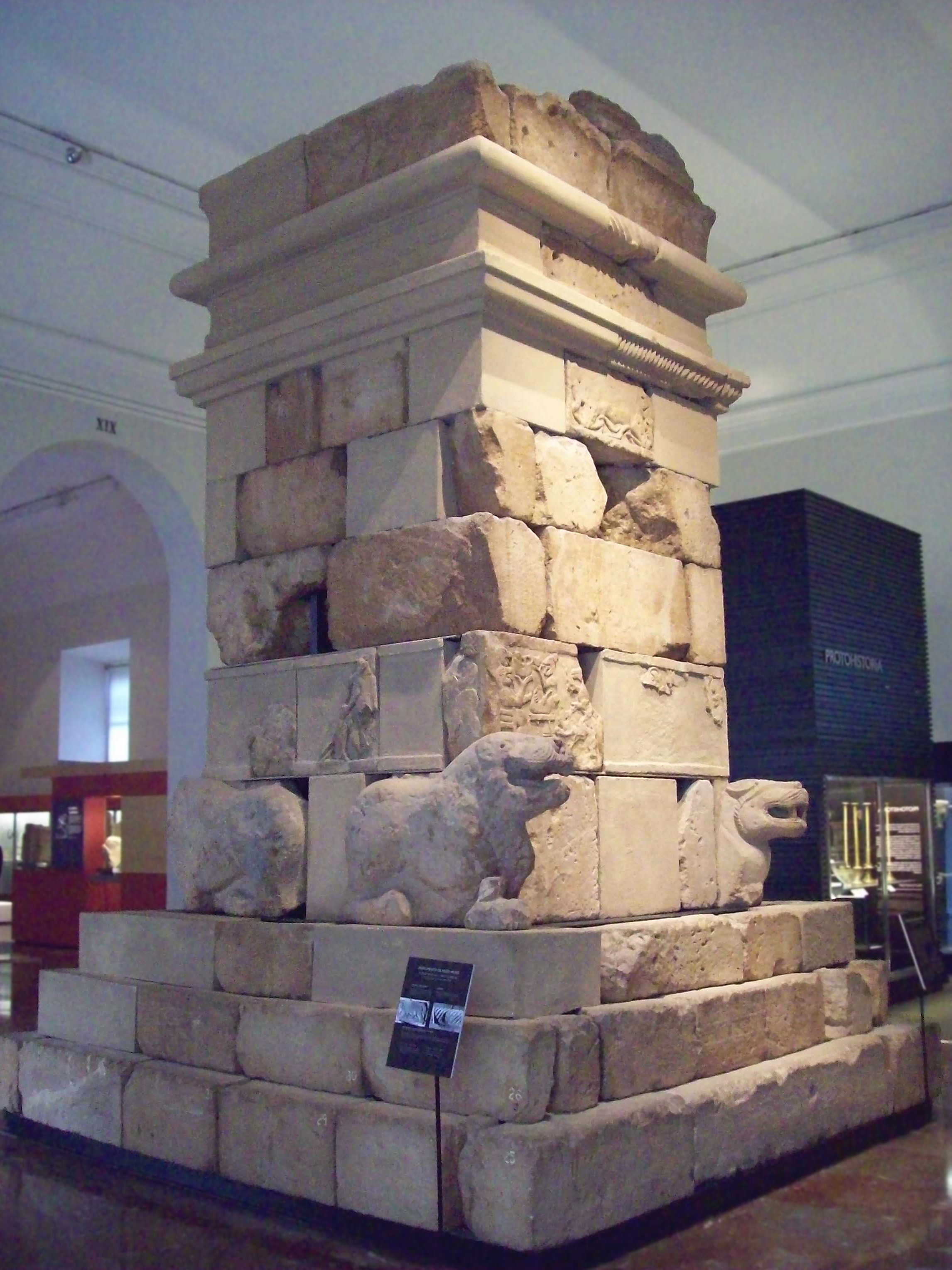
the so-called Mausoleum of Pozo Moro. Sandstone Iberian mausoleum, built at the end of the 6th century BC in Chinchilla de Monte-Aragón.

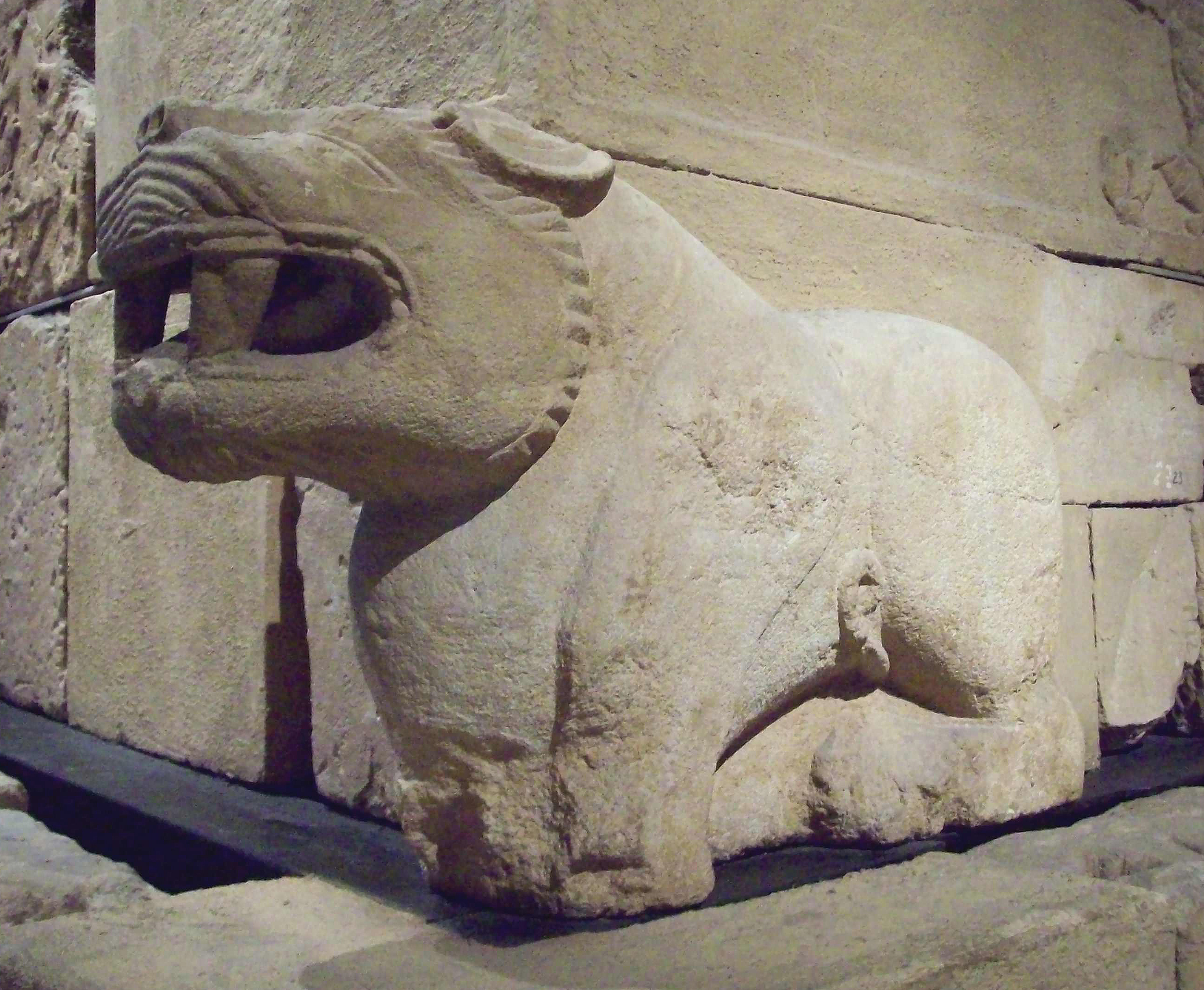
Detail of the Mausoleum of Pozo Moro.

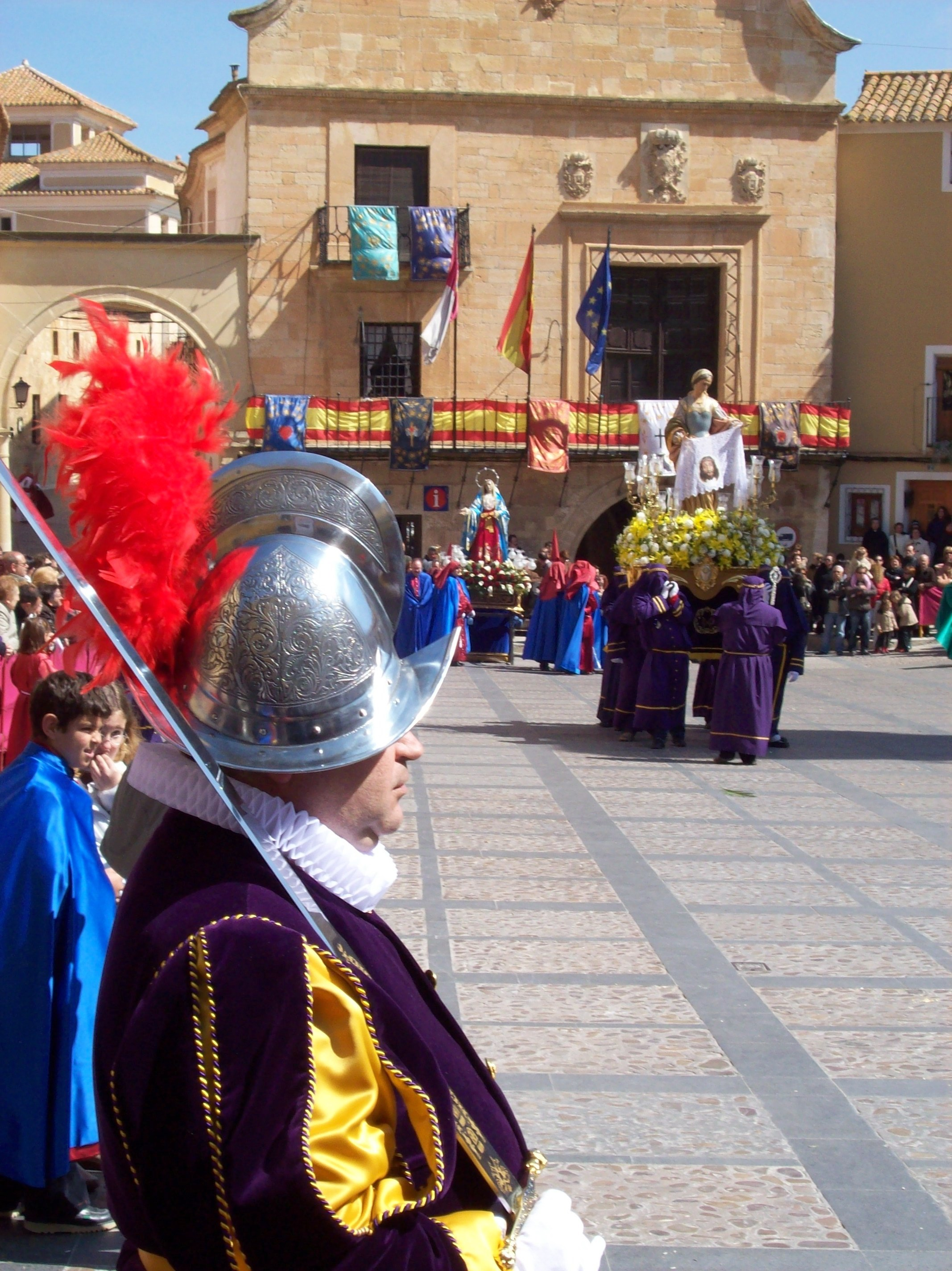
"La Verónica" during the Holy week

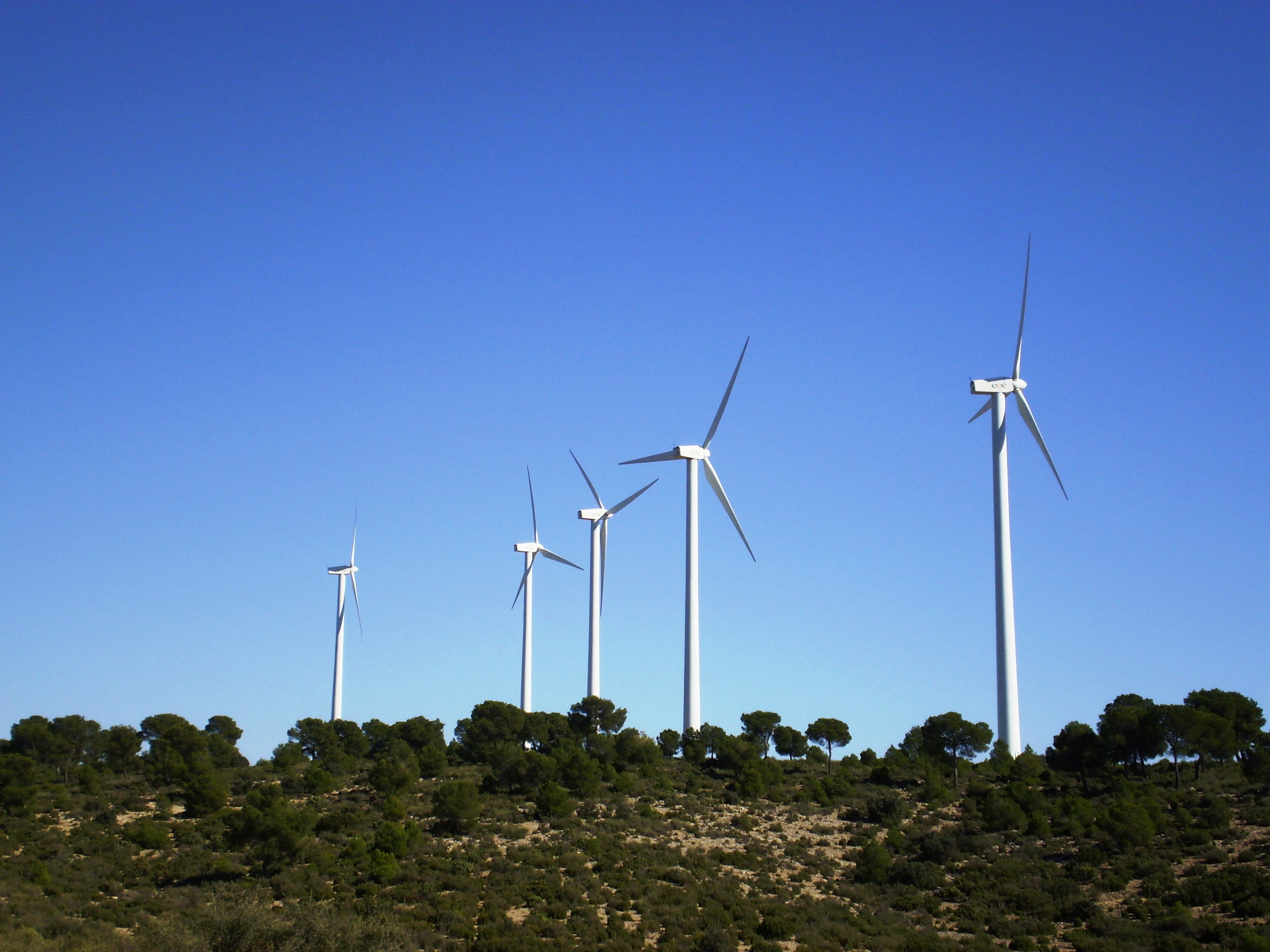
Eolic park in Chinchilla
