= Homicide in Spain =

Homicide (homicidio in Spanish), according to the Spanish Criminal Code of 1995, is a crime which contravenes the legal right to "independent human life". It is found in article 138 which states: "Whoever kills another shall be convicted of manslaughter, punishable with a sentence of imprisonment from ten to fifteen years".

The main legal concept in article 138 is bad faith. It may be present in any form, whether direct or indirect. The active subject (whoever kills) as well as the passive subject (the one who is killed) are universal, meaning that either can be any person, regardless of the circumstances.

Asesinato (literately assassination) is homicide committed with aggravating circumstances (articles 139 and 140).

Homicide committed by grave recklessness is covered in article 142, which includes both reckless homicide by weapons or motor vehicles and homicide caused by professional recklessness. It states:

1. Whoever causes the death of another by serious negligence shall be convicted of manslaughter and punished with a sentence of imprisonment of one to four years.
2. When the manslaughter is committed using a motor vehicle, a moped or a firearm, the punishment shall also, and respectively, include deprivation of the right to drive motor vehicles and mopeds or deprivation of the right to own and carry weapons from one to six years.
3. When the manslaughter is committed due to professional negligence, the punishment of special barring from exercise of the profession, trade or cargo shall also be imposed, for a period of three to six years.

It is necessary to indicate that under Spanish law, involuntary homicide is not regulated; in the majority of cases the law that will be applied will be somewhere between homicide and the criminal concept which is involved.

Other specific concepts, such as parricide and uxoricide also do not exist, since in Spanish criminal law the punishment is founded in the violation of the legal right and not the fact of killing one particular person or another. For these cases, the circumstances of kinship, found in article 23, could be used as aggravating.

== See also ==
- Homicide
