= Roman conquest of the Iberian Peninsula =

Roman conquest and provinces in Hispania, beginning in 220 BC, and ending with the Cantabrian Coast in 19 BC

The Roman Republic conquered and occupied territories in the Iberian Peninsula that were previously under the control of native Celtic, Iberian, Celtiberian and Aquitanian tribes and the Carthaginian Empire. The Carthaginian territories in the south and east of the peninsula were conquered in 206 BC during the Second Punic War. Control was gradually extended over most of the peninsula without annexations. It was completed after the end of the Roman Republic (27 BC), by Augustus, the first Roman emperor, who annexed the whole of the peninsula to the Roman Empire in 19 BC.

Roman acquisition of the Carthaginian territories in south and east Hispania were the result of defeating the Carthaginians (206 BC) during the Second Punic War (218–201 BC). Afterwards, in 197 BC, the Romans established two Roman provinces: Hispania Citerior along most of the east coast and Hispania Ulterior in the south.

Over the next 170 years, the Republic expanded its control over Hispania. This was a gradual process of economic, diplomatic and cultural infiltration and colonization, with campaigns of military suppression when there was native resistance, rather than the result of a single policy of conquest. The Romans turned some native cities outside their two provinces into tributary cities and established outposts and Roman colonies to expand their control. Administrative arrangements were ad hoc. Governors who were sent to Hispania tended to act independently from the Senate due to the great distance from Rome. In the latter part of this period, the Senate attempted to exercise more control, but this was to try to curb abuse and extortion by officials in the peninsula. Conquest was a process of assimilation of the local tribes into the Roman culture and its economic system and laws.

This changed after the end of the Republic and the establishment of rule by emperors in Rome. After the Roman victory in the Cantabrian Wars in the north of the peninsula (the last rebellion against the Romans in Hispania), Augustus conquered the north of Hispania, annexed the whole peninsula and carried out administrative reorganisation in 19 BC.

The Roman province of Hispania Citerior was significantly expanded and came to include the eastern part of central Hispania and northern Hispania. It was renamed Hispania Tarraconensis. Hispania Ulterior was divided into the provinces of Baetica (most of modern Andalusia) and Lusitania, which covered present day Portugal up to the River Durius (Douro), the present autonomous community of Extremadura and a small part of the province of Salamanca in today's Spain.

== The Second Punic War ==
=== Carthaginian Iberia ===
Between the 8th and 7th centuries BC, the Phoenicians (and later the Carthaginians) established trading contacts in the southern part of the Iberian Peninsula as well as along part of the east coast. Their trading posts on the coast exported minerals and other resources available in Iberia and imported manufactures from the Eastern Mediterranean.

During the 7th century BC, Greek traders based in Massalia (modern Marseille) traded throughout the coastal commercial centres of the region without establishing a permanent presence and later founded the trading cities of Emporion (Ampurias) and Rhode (Roses). Part of this Greek trade was transported by Phoenician ships. The effect of contacts with the Greeks and the Phoenicians was that some of the coastal native peninsular peoples adopted some aspects of these eastern Mediterranean cultures.

After Carthage was defeated by Rome in the First Punic War (264–241 BC) and lost the islands of Sicily, Sardinia and Corsica to Rome, Hamilcar Barca conquered southern Hispania. His family established Carthaginian dominions in most of southern Hispania. The subjugation of the tribes in Hispania, which was later extended over the greater part the east coast of the peninsula, was achieved by force or through tributes, alliances, or marriages with local chiefs. The peninsula would go on to supply Carthage with a significant number of conscripts from areas controlled by Carthage along with mercenaries, especially the Balearic slingers and the Celtiberians.

=== The Ebro Treaty ===
Hamilcar was succeeded by Hasdrubal the Fair, his son-in-law, in 226 BC. Rome concluded a treaty with Hasbrubal "with the stipulation that neither side should extend its dominion beyond the Ebro, while the Saguntines, situated between the empires of the two peoples, should be preserved in independence". The cities in the northern part of the east coast were concerned about further Carthaginian expansion and allied with Rome to get her protection. This led to the establishment of the River Ebro as the boundary of the spheres of influence of the Carthaginians and the Romans in eastern Hispania. The city of Saguntum (Sagunto, formerly Murviedro) also made an alliance with Rome. It lay about midway between the Ebro and New Carthage, (Roman, Cartago Nova, today's Cartagena). The latter was an outpost founded by Hasdrubal the Fair. At that time, the Carthaginian territories lay to the south of Saguntum. Hannibal, Hamilcar's son and Hasdrubal's successor, extended Carthaginian territories northwards to the banks of the River Ebro. As a result, Saguntum found itself surrounded by Carthaginian territory.

=== The Saguntum Matter ===
The Second Punic War between Carthage and Rome was sparked off by an attack by Hannibal on Saguntum. Hannibal found a pretext to wage war on Saguntum in a dispute between the city and the surrounding Turduli. In response, Saguntum sent envoys to Rome to ask for help. The Roman Senate decided to send commissioners to Hispania to investigate the situation there, to warn Hannibal, if necessary, not to interfere with Saguntine matters and then to proceed to Carthage to submit the Saguntine complaints to the Carthaginian council. However, Hannibal had begun the siege of Saguntum before their departure. The Senate decided to still send the commissioners to Hannibal and, if he refused to cease hostilities, they were to go to Carthage and demand his surrender in satisfaction of the broken treaty.

The strong fortifications of Saguntum and stiff resistance by the populace repelled Hannibal's attack. Hannibal was seriously wounded when he approached the city wall. When the Roman ambassadors arrived at the port Hannibal said that it was unsafe for them to go to the city and that he was too busy to see them. Because he realised that if they could not see him they would go to Carthage, he sent a letter to his supporters in Carthage telling them to prevent his opponents from making any concessions to Rome. The mission of the commissioners in Carthage achieved nothing. The Carthaginian council replied that the war was started by the Saguntines not by Hannibal, and that Rome would commit an act of injustice if it took the side of the Saguntines.

After a lull that allowed the Saguntines to build a new wall to replace the damaged one, fierce fighting resumed. Hannibal's peace conditions were that Saguntum was to give all its gold and silver to the Turduli and that the townsfolk were to leave the city and go wherever the Carthaginians should order them. The Saguntines threw their gold and silver into a fire. Hannibal seized the city and there was a great slaughter of its inhabitants. The siege of Saguntum was said to have taken eight months. Hannibal then wintered in Cartago Nova.

In Rome, there was a feeling of shame at not having sent help to Saguntum and at Rome being so unprepared for war. Hannibal was now expected to cross the River Ebro with the support of forces from the Hispanic tribes. The Romans were concerned that this might rouse the Gauls in northern Italy to rebel.

The Romans decided to fight two campaigns, one in Africa (the Roman name for today's Tunisia and western Libya, Carthage's homeland) and one in Hispania. Six Roman legions (24,000 infantry and 1,800 cavalry) and 40,000 infantry of Italian allies and 4,400 allied cavalry were levied. A fleet of 220 ships of war and 20 light galleys was prepared. Two legions with 4,000 infantry and 300 cavalry each, 16,000 allied infantry and 1,800 allied cavalry and 160 warships and 12 light galleys were assigned to Tiberius Sempronius Longus, who was to lead the expedition to Africa. The expedition to Hispania was assigned to Publius Cornelius Scipio with two Roman legions, 14,000 allied infantry and 1,600 allied cavalry, and only 60 ships because an enemy naval offensive in Hispania was not expected.

A Roman commission was sent to Carthage to inquire whether the city had sanctioned Hannibal's attack on Saguntum. If, as it seemed likely, Carthage admitted to this, they were to formally declare war on Carthage. According to Livy, a Carthaginian senator replied that Rome was seeking to extort a confession of guilt. He added that it was for Carthage to investigate and take proceedings against one of its citizens if he had done something on just his own authority. The only point Rome could discuss was whether Hannibal's action was compatible with the terms of the treaty. He argued that Saguntum was not a Roman ally at the time of the treaty. Hasdrubal had made a treaty with Saguntum that Carthage could not be bound to because it was made without her knowledge. Livy states that Quintus Fabius Maximus Verrucosus, who had put forward the question, said: "Here we bring you war and peace, take which you please." In defiance he was told to decide what he preferred himself. He said that he gave Carthage war and Carthage accepted.

=== The Roman campaigns ===
==== First campaign ====
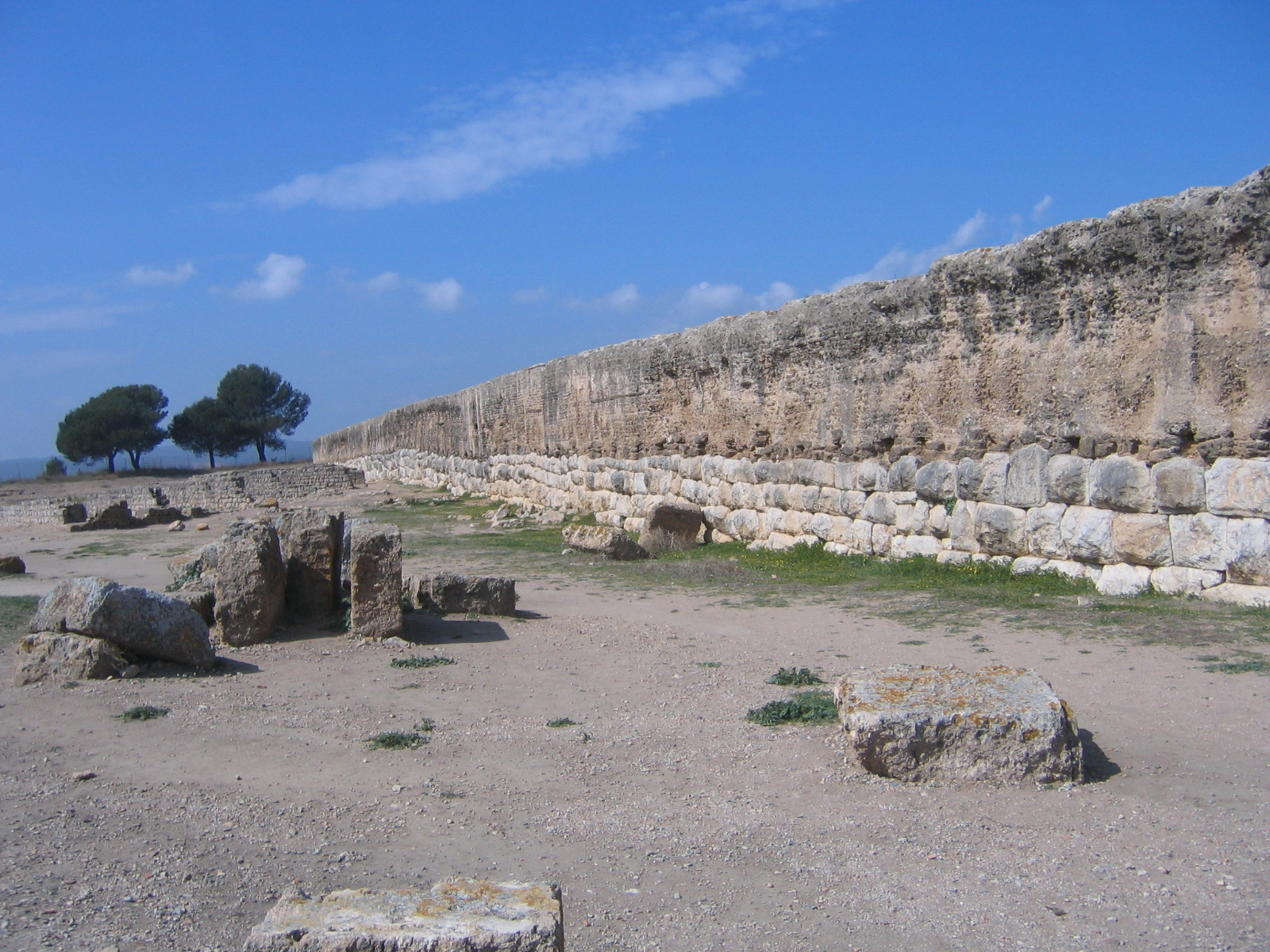
Roman wall of Emporiae, initial entry point of Rome to the Iberian Peninsula

In 218 BC, the expeditionary force to Hispania reached Massalia (Marseilles) only to discover that Hannibal was already on his way to Italy. Publius Cornelius Scipio sent 300 cavalry inland to locate Hannibal's forces. By this time, Hannibal was crossing the River Rhone. He sent 500 Numidian cavalry towards the Romans to ascertain their numbers and their intentions. The two clashed and the Romans won a bloody battle. Hannibal continued his journey to Italy. Scipio decided to return to Italy to fight Hannibal there and sent his brother, Gnaeus Cornelius Scipio Calvus, to Hispania with the bulk of the expeditionary force. Gnaeus landed at Emporion, (Empúries). Livy states that Gnaeus gained the support of the coastal peoples north of the Ebro by renewing old alliances and forming new ones. Several strong contingents were recruited from amongst them. Hanno, who was in charge of Carthaginian forces in Hispania, encamped near the Romans and offered battle. Gnaeus Scipio, who preferred to fight the two Carthaginian commanders separately (the other Carthaginian commander was Hasdrubal Barca) accepted. The result was the Battle of Cissa, which was fought near Tarraco (Tarragona). Hanno was defeated and lost 6,000 men while 2,000 of his men, including those who were guarding the camp, were taken as prisoners. The Romans seized the camp and looted the baggage left by Hannibal. Hanno and Indibilis, the chief of the Ilergetes whom Polybius described as "despot of all central Iberia and a strenuous supporter of the Carthaginians", were also captured.

Hasdrubal, who had crossed the Ebro with 8,000 infantry and 1,000 cavalry to look for the Romans as soon as they landed, heard of Hanno's defeat. He took to the sea, and he found the Roman fleet near Tarraco. Hasdrubal landed his cavalry, which found and killed many of the Romans who were foraging in the surrounding countryside and forced them back to their ships. He then withdrew across the Ebro before Gnaeus Scipio returned. The latter left a small garrison at Tarraco and took the fleet back to Emporiae.

Hasdrubal then incited the Ilergetes, who had given Gnaeus Scipio hostages, to revolt. Their men ravaged the fields of the local Roman allies. Gnaeus Scipio came out of his winter camp and devastated the territory of the Ilergetes, drove them to their capital, Atanagrus, besieged it, subdued the Ilergetes and exacted hostages and money. He then attacked the Ausetani, near the Ebro, who were Carthaginian allies and ambushed the Lacetani, who had come to the assistance to their Neighbours, killing 12,000 of them. The siege of Atanagrus lasted for 30 days. After the chief of the Ilergetes fled to Hasdrubal, the town surrendered. Gnaeus Scipio established winter quarters in Tarraco.

In 217 BC, Hasdrubal marched his army along the coast while his ships sailed near the shore. Gnaeus Scipio embarked with his best troops on 35 ships. His scouts spotted the enemy fleet at the mouth of the Ebro. The Carthaginians hastily prepared for battle, but in the Battle of the Ebro River the Roman ships approached in battle formation and the enemy ships fled. The Carthaginian line was overstretched and they did not manage to make it up the mouth of the river and ran ashore. The men disembarked at the mouth of the river and joined the infantry. The Romans dragged the beached ships into the water and seized 25 of them.

Hasdrubal withdrew to Cartago Nova. The Romans devastated the coastal land as far as the pass of Castulo, which led through the Sierra Morena, north of Cartago Nova. Gnaeus Scipio then headed north gaining the submission of many of the communities north of the Ebro. However, Mandonius and Indibilis, the chieftains of the Ilergetes, got their tribesmen to ravage the lands of the Roman allies. Gnaeus Scipio sent a detachment that easily defeated them. Meanwhile, the Celtiberians (who lived in east-central Hispania) invaded the area near Cartago Nova. They seized three fortified towns, defeated Hasdrubal, killed 15,000 and took 4,000 prisoners.

Publius Scipio, whose command was extended, rejoined his brother and brought a reinforcement of 30 warships, 8,000 troops, and a large supply convoy. As Hasdrubal was occupied fighting the Celtiberians, the brothers marched to Saguntum. Gnaeus Scipio took charge of the army and Publius Scipio commanded the fleet.

Campaigns in Spain, 216 BC

In 216 BC, after receiving reinforcements of 4,000 infantry and 1,000 cavalry from Africa, Hasdrubal gave orders for the Carthaginian fleet to be put into readiness to protect the Balearic Islands and the coast. There was a desertion of the naval captains who were no longer loyal after being been heavily censured for cowardice for abandoning the fleet at the Battle of the Ebro River. The deserters had started an agitation amongst the Tartesii and several cities revolted. Hasdrubal invaded the Tartesii's territory, surrounded their camp and won a battle.

Hasdrubal was then ordered by Carthage to make for Italy as soon as possible and the general Himilco was sent with an army to take his place. Hasdrubal hired Gallic mercenaries and set off towards the Ebro. The two Scipios prepared to meet him to try and stop him joining Hannibal in Italy. They concentrated their forces at the Ebro and crossed the river. They decided to hinder his march by attacking Carthaginian allies. They prepared to besiege Hibera, a town near the Ebro that was the richest one in the area. Instead of coming to Hibera's aid, Hasdrubal attacked a town that was a recent Roman ally. The Romans abandoned the siege and headed towards Hasdrubal. The Carthaginians were routed and Hasdrubal fled with a few followers. This secured the wavering tribes for Rome forcing Hasdrubal to remain in Hispania.

In 215 BC, Mago Barca, Hannibal's brother, was preparing to go to Italy with a force of 12,000 infantry, 1,500 cavalry, 20 elephants and 60 warships. Carthage considered sending him to Hispania instead. However, Sardinia looked vulnerable as the Romans were sending fresh and undisciplined troops there and the Sardinians were ready to rebel if they had a leader. Therefore, Mago was sent to Hispania while Hasdrubal was sent to Sardinia. The town of Iliturgi, which had gone over to the Romans, was attacked by three Carthaginian armies under Hasdrubal, Mago, and Hannibal, the son of Bomilcar. The Scipio's forced their way through the three camps, brought corn (the town was in need for food) and encouraged the town to fight. The resultant battle was between 60,000 Carthaginians and 16,000 Romans. Yet, the Romans routed the enemy, which lost 16,000 men and 7 elephants; 3,000 men and 1,000 horses were captured. The three camps were seized. The Carthaginians attacked the nearby town of Intibili and recruited men from the area who were eager to fight for booty or pay to make up for their losses. There was a second battle and the Carthaginians lost 13,000 men; 2,000 men and 9 elephants were captured. Livy wrote that 'nearly all the tribes of Hispania went over to Rome, and the successes gained in [Hispania] that summer were far greater than those in Italy'.

In 214 BC, Mago and Hasdrubal routed a large Hispanic force. All of Hispania south of the Ebro would have defected from the Romans if Publius Cornelius Scipio had not quickly crossed the river while the allies were still wavering. At first, he encamped at Castrum Album (probably modern Alicante), whose citadel had been fortified and stocked with grain. However, the area was filled with the enemy and a Roman column was attacked. The Romans moved to a quieter area and fortified a camp at Victory Mountain (location unknown). Gnaeus Scipio arrived with all his troops. Hasdrubal the son of Gisgo (usually called Hasdrubal Gisgo by modern writers) also arrived. The Carthaginians now had three commanders and a full army. They encamped across a river opposite the Roman camp. Publius Scipio went out with some light cavalry in reconnaissance, but he was spotted. He was wounded and would have been overpowered had he not seized a hill nearby. He was surrounded, but his brother rescued him. Castulo (which was a powerful city and a close ally of Carthage; Hannibal took a wife from there) defected to Rome. The Carthaginians set out to seize the Roman garrison at Iliturgis. Gnaeus Scipio went to its aid with a legion in light marching order, fought his way between the two Carthaginian camps, inflicted heavy losses on the besiegers and entered the town. The next day, he carried out a successful sortie. The Carthaginians lost over 12,000 men and more than 1,000 were captured. They left and begun to besiege Bigerra in the upper valley of the River Baetis (Guadalquivir). Gnaeus Scipio raised the siege without a fight. The Romans pursued them and there was another battle. Publius Scipio was carried to the field on a litter. The Romans won. Mago was sent by his brother to raise troops among the locals. These soon replaced the casualties and incited another battle. The enemy was defeated again and lost more than 8,000 men and 3 elephants; 1,000 men and 8 elephants were captured. Two Gallic chieftains, Moeniacoepto and Vismaro, fell in the battle. The Romans then seized Saguntum and expelled its Carthaginian garrison. The Turduli, who had brought about the war between Saguntum and Carthage, were defeated. They were sold into slavery and their city was destroyed.

In 213 BC, Syphax, king of the Masaesyli of western Numidia (Algeria), rebelled against Carthage. The Scipio's sent three officers to conclude an alliance. The Numidians were traditionally cavalrymen and did not have any infantry. Syphax asked for help with equipping and training infantry. One of the Roman officers, Statorius, stayed behind as an adviser. Syphax sent envoys to Hispania to get the approval of the Roman commanders and to persuade the Numidians in the Carthaginian army to defect to Rome. Statorius set up troops based on the Roman model and taught them entrenchment work and other military tasks. The Carthaginians sent envoys to Gala, the king of the Massylii of eastern Numidia to ask for his help. The young Masinissa persuaded his father to assign him the command of the war against Syphax. With Carthaginian help, he won a big battle. Syphax fled with some of his cavalry to the Maurusii, a Numidian tribe in northern Morocco, opposite Gades (Cádiz). Livy did not say what happened. He also wrote that the only thing worth recording for Hispania for that year was that the Romans hired Celtiberian mercenaries for the same sum the Carthaginians paid. This was the first time the Romans had mercenaries in their camp. He also wrote that for two years the conflict in Hispania 'was carried on by diplomacy more than by arm'. Masinissa went on to lead Numidian cavalry troops, who fought alongside the Carthaginians in Hispania.

In 212 BC, the two Scipios joined their forces and agreed that it was time for a push to end the war. They hired 20,000 Celtiberians and thought that they were enough as reinforcements. Hasdrubal Gisgo and Mago, had united their armies and their joint camp was about five days' march from the Romans. The camp of Hasdrubal Barca (the veteran in Hispania), near a city called Amtorgis, was the nearest one. The two Scipios wanted to attack this first, but were afraid that, if he was defeated, the other Hasdrubal and Mago might withdraw to forests and mountains and prolong the war. Thus, they divided their forces into two to cover the whole of Hispania. Publius was to lead two-thirds of the Romans and the Italian allies against Mago and Hasdrubal and Gnaeus was to lead one-third of the old army and the Celtiberians against Hasdrubal Barca. They set off together and encamped near Amtorgis in sight of the enemy on the other side of a river. Publius Scipio then moved on. Hasdrubal Barca realised that his opponents depended on the Celtiberians and set out to get them to defect. The Celtiberian chieftains were offered a large bribe to withdraw their forces. With this prospect to get equal money to go home, they left. Gnaeus Scipio withdrew as far as he could. The enemy had crossed the river and was pursuing him.

Meanwhile, Publius Scipio had to face the arrival of Masinissa and his Numidians. Masinissa sought to check the Roman advance with constant attacks by day and night. This cut off the foragers. He also rode to the Roman outposts causing alarm and confusion. He often charged the ramparts at night. Indibilis was approaching with 7,500 Suessetani (who lived in today's western Aragon) to help the Carthaginians. The situation was developing into a siege. Publius Scipio was forced to risk advancing on Indibilis at night. When daylight came, he was having the better in an irregular battle fought in order of march rather than of battle. However, the Numidians showed up and swept around both flanks. The Carthaginian commanders also arrived and attacked the rear. Publius Scipio was killed by a lance. The Romans fled and were pursued; more were killed in the rout than in the battle. Night brought the carnage to an end. Hasdrubal and Mago went to join Hasdrubal Barca by forced marches, thinking that their joint forces would bring the war to a close. Gnaeus realised that his brother had been defeated and withdrew, covering a great distance in one night and eluding the enemy. When at dawn the latter realised that he had gone, the Numidian cavalry pursued at full speed, caught up with him and forced him to defend himself while still trying to advance so as not to be caught by the infantry. As this seriously delayed him, Gnaeus Scipio led his men onto a hill. This enabled the Romans to fend off the Numidians. However, when the Carthaginian commanders arrived, they were without entrenchments and their position was untenable. The hill was rocky; there was no wood to make a stockade, no earth for a rampart, and it was not steep enough to make the ascent difficult. The Romans tied together their saddles and the baggage to form a barricade. The gaps were filled with kits and packages. As it was difficult to clamber over it, remove the heavy obstacles or cut through the tightly packed saddles, the enemy was delayed for a considerable amount of time. However, they managed to make several openings. The Romans were slaughtered, but a good many managed to escape. Gnaeus Scipio was killed 29 days after his brother.

The Roman defeat was almost total and they would have been driven out of Hispania had it not been for Lucius Marcius, an officer who rallied the remnant of the routed forces, assembled a force and joined Tiberius Fonteius, who had been left in charge of Publius Scipio's camp. They pitched a camp north of the Ebro and the soldiers elected Lucius Marcius as their commander. The defences were strengthened and supplies were stored. Hasdrubal Gisgo crossed the Ebro. When the enemy approached, Lucius Marcius gave the battle signal, which caught the Carthaginians by surprise. The Roman army had been annihilated and they wondered where these men were from and who their commander was. They slowly withdrew and as the attack became more consistent they fled. Lucius Marcius withdrew. Lucius Marcius noticed that the Carthaginians were careless in guarding their camps and devised a plan. He considered that it was easier to attack Hasdrubal's camp while he was alone, before the three Carthaginian commanders might unite – the other Carthaginian camps were six miles beyond Hasdrubal's. A Roman contingent with some cavalry hid in a thickly wooded valley between the enemy camps, which cut off the road. The rest marched to the camp quietly at night. There were no outposts nor guards and they entered without opposition. The enemy were killed while half asleep. The Romans then went to the second camp where there was carelessness, too. The men at the outposts were unarmed. The Romans attacked and their shields were bloodied by the previous battle. This frightened the enemy, who fled. Those who were not killed were driven out of the camp. Livy noted that, according to one source, as many as 37,000 of the enemy were killed and 1,830 were captured. Another source held that only Mago's camp was taken, that 7,000 of the enemy were killed and that the battle against Hasdrubal was a sortie; here 10,000 were killed and 4,380 were captured. According to a third source 5,000 men were killed in an ambush when Mago pursued the Romans. These feats were romanticised by Roman writers, and they were made possible by the Carthaginians' delay in following up their advantage.

==== Second campaign ====
In 211 BC, the Roman senate sent Gaius Nero to Hispania with 6,000 Roman and 6,000 allied infantry and 300 Roman and 600 allied cavalry. He landed at Tarraco, marched to the Ebro and took over the force of Tiberius Fonteius and Lucius Marcius. He then advanced against the enemy and occupied the two exits of the pass to Lapides Atri (Black Boulders), in Ausetanian territory, where Hasdrubal (Hamilcar's son) was encamped, thus shutting him in. Hasdrubal promised that he would take his army out of Hispania if Nero let him out of his position and asked him for talks the next day to put the terms in writing, which Nero accepted. Hasdrubal made the talks drag on for days. Meanwhile, his army gradually sneaked out of the pass at night. Finally, he left, too. Nero pursued him and offered battle, but he declined.

Tribes in Hispania who had revolted after the defeat of the two Scipios showed no signs of restoring their allegiance. They decided to send a new commander-in-chief and increase the army in Hispania. There was uncertainty about the appointment, which demanded exceptional care. They decided to put the matter to the vote of the people. Publius Cornelius Scipio, the son and nephew of the two Scipios who had died in Hispania, who was only 24 and had not held high office, put his candidacy forward. He was elected unanimously. Livy did not explain the reason for the decision, or for this unprecedented election of a man below the required age for command. Scipio set off with a force he had formed out of the old army in Hispania and reinforcements of 10,000 infantry and 1,000 cavalry. Given his youth, Marcus Junius Silanus was appointed as his second in command to assist him. Scipio landed at Emporiae (or Ampurias, near the Pyrenees) marched to Tarraco and took over the army of Gaius Nero. He was met by envoys from all the friendly tribes. They reported that the tribes were unsettled due to the changing fortunes of the war. He visited these tribes and praised them for holding on after terrible blows and for keeping the enemy to the south of the Ebro, depriving them of any advantages from their victories. He inspected the winter quarters. After his return to Tarraco, Marcus Silianus succeeded Nero and the new troops were sent into winter quarters. The Carthaginian armies withdrew to their winter quarters, Hasdrubal to Gades (Cádiz) on the south coast, Mago inland, above Castulo and Hasdrubal Barca near Saguntum.

In 210 BC, Scipio sent his ships and troops to the mouth of the Ebro and brought an allied contingent of 5,000 men. He crossed the Ebro with 25,000 infantry and 2,500 cavalry, and left Silanus in charge north of the Ebro with 3,000 infantry and 300 cavalry. Considering that he was not a match for the three Carthaginian armies together, he marched on Cartago Nova (Cartagena), a major Carthaginian stronghold that held enemy war stores, the war-chest, and hostages from all over Hispania. It had the only harbour in the area that could host a large fleet. He told his plan only to Gaius Laelius, who was told to time the arrival of his fleet there to coincide with Scipio's army.

Scipio pitched camp opposite the north side of the town. The rear had a double rampant and the front was protected by the terrain. The town was on a promontory on the west side of an inlet two and a half miles deep. On the west, it was enclosed by a shallow lagoon. An isthmus a quarter of a mile long connected it with the mainland. Scipio lined up the ships in the harbour. Mago posted 2,000 townsfolk in the direction of the Roman camp and stationed 500 soldiers in the citadel and 500 on the top of the hill, towards the east. The rest of the townsmen were kept in reserve. The townsmen headed towards the Roman camp. The Romans withdrew a short distance to get closer to the reinforcements who were to be sent. Successive reinforcements put the enemy to flight. The defenders of the city wall left the fortifications. Scipio saw that in many places the walls had no defenders and ordered the ladders. The troops from ships started to attack the sea front. The soldiers got in each other's way. Very few of the ladders were long enough to reach the top of this very high wall and the longest ones were weak. Many men fell to the ground and the retreat was sounded. Scipio ordered fresh men to grab the ladders. Fishermen in Tarraco had told him that it was easy to approach the wall on foot at low tide. The tide was receding and strong wind made the lagoon even shallower. This opened a path to the walls for the Romans. Scipio took 500 men to the water. The ascend on this part of the wall was easy. There were no fortifications and no guards. The defenders were concentrating of the land side. The men entered the city without opposition and went to the gate where the fighting was. Caught by surprise the defenders gave up. The gate was battered from both sides and smashed. The soldiers marched to the forum. Some of the enemy went to a garrison hill to the east of the town and some went to the citadel. The hill was taken at the first assault. Mago then surrendered the citadel.

This victory was of great strategic importance. It shifted the theatre of war. Scipio broke out of the area the Romans had been confined to, took the war to enemy territory, and extended Roman control to an area close to the valley of the River Baetis, which crossed southern Hispania. The Romans never fought on the east coast again. Scipio also captured the Carthaginian arsenal and treasure stored in the city. Eighty ships, 120 of the latest catapults and 281 smaller ones, 23 larger and 52 smaller ballistae (crossbow-like catapults), many larger and smaller scorpions (crossbows) and many other weapons were captured. So were large quantities of gold and silver; 63 merchant ships were seized in the harbour. Their cargo included grain, weapons, bronze, ship timber, linen and esparto (used to make ropes). Pursuing good relations with the locals, Scipio released the citizens of the town among the 10,000 free men captured and restored their property. The non-citizens and the slaves were recruited as oarsmen and 2,000 craftsmen were made public slaves, who would be freed if they made war equipment for the Romans.

Scipio arranged for the hostages, which the Carthaginians had kept to bind tribes to themselves, to be collected by their relatives and friends. The wife of Mandonius and the daughters of Indibilis, the chief of the [Ilergetes], were among them. An example of Scipio's effort to establish good relations with the locals can be seen in the story of a young woman who had been captured. He learnt that she had been betrothed to Aluccius, a young Celtiberian noble. He sent for her parents and her betrothed. He told the latter that his beloved had been treated respectfully and that she had been reserved for him so that she could be given to him unviolated. In return, he asked him to be a friend of Rome. Aluccius replied that he could not make a return adequate to his feelings. The parents had brought a lot of gold for her ransom. When she was given freely they begged Scipio to accept it as a gift. Since they insisted, he gave it to Aluccius as a wedding present. Back home, Aluccius enlisted a body of his retainers and gave Scipio a picked force of 1,400 mounted men. Scipio sent Mago and 15 Carthaginian senators to Rome. When he returned to Tarraco, he called an assembly of the allies, new and old.

In 209 BC, the command of Publius Cornelius Scipio and Marcus Junius Silanus was extended. Scipio continued to try to win over various tribes and restore those who received their hostages. Edeso, the chieftain of the Edetani (who lived in today's northern Valencia, just south of the Ebro), visited Scipio in Tarraco. His wife and sons were in Scipio's hands. He wanted to become the leader of the pro-Roman movement. He asked for his wife and children back and said that he was the first chief to come to him. The others, instead were still interacting with the Carthaginians while reaching out to the Romans. If Scipio accepted his friendship, the other tribes would follow suit to recover their hostages and make an alliance with Rome. Scipio agreed, and the tribes north of the Ebro, who had not been friendly with the Romans, now joined them. Indibilis and Mandonius, the chiefs of the Ilergetes whom Polybius described as "two of the greatest princes in Hispania", abandoned Hasdrubal's camp. They had been the most trustworthy Carthaginian allies. However, on the pretext that he mistrusted them, Hasdrubal demanded a large sum of money and their wives and children as hostages. Polybius noted that, after their victory over the Romans, the Carthaginians 'treated the natives in an overbearing manner and their subjects turned from friends to enemies'.

Hasdrubal realised that he needed to make a bold move to stop the wastage. Scipio wanted to engage the Carthaginian commanders separately. He advanced against Hasdrubal. It was while he was en route that he was met by Indibilis and Mandonius. Scipio handed over the daughters of the latter and concluded a treaty with them. They shared the Roman camp and acted as guides until they reached the enemy. Polybius wrote that Hasdrubal had fallen out with the other Carthaginian commanders. This was one of his worries, along with the native desertions and the defection of Indibilis. He decided to meet the enemy in battle and if he lost he would retreat to Gaul, enlist as many natives as he could and go to Italy to join his brother Hannibal. He was encamped near the town of Baecula, in the area of [Castulo] (near today's Linares), a high mountain area at the head of the valley of the River Baetis, which crossed southern Hispania. This led to the Battle of Baecula. According to Polybius on hearing of the arrival of the Romans he moved his camp and placed it where his rear was protected by a river and his front by a ridge. He kept a covering force on the ridge. Scipio saw the advantageous position of the camp and waited for two days, but then he worried about the possible arrival of Mago and [Hasdrubal Gisgo] and took his chance. He sent the light infantry and a picked contingent of heavy infantry against the enemy force on the ridge. When Hasdrubal saw that these men were hard pressed, he led his men to the ridge. Scipio sent the whole of his light infantry in support. He led half of it, skirted the ridge to the left of the enemy and attacked. He ordered the rest to do the same on the right. Hasdrubal was still leading his men out of the camp. He had thought that the enemy would not attack his strong position and now, with this sudden attack, he deployed his troops too late. As his wings had not yet occupied their ground, the Roman wings succeeded in climbing the ridge. They fell on the enemy who was still getting into formation and forced them to flee. Hasdrubal took his war-chest and his elephants, gathered as many of the fugitives as he could and withdrew to the River Tagus and towards the pass of the Pyrenees he needed to cross into Gaul as originally intended.

Livy gave a different account of the battle. There were cavalry outposts before the enemy camp. Scipio sent a light-armed vanguard from the front of his column against them before choosing a site for his camp. The cavalry was forced back to their camp. Scipio pitched his camp. At night, Hasdrubal sent his troops to a hill that had a flat top, a river behind it, and a steep bank at the front and sides. Beneath it, a gently sloping lower area was surrounded by a ledge that was difficult to climb. The next day, the Romans lined up, and Hasdrubal sent the Numidian cavalry and light-armed Balearic and African troops to the lower plain. Scipio sent a contingent to hold the entrance of the river valley and another to block the road to the hill. He then set off towards the light infantry on the lowest brow of the hill with his light-armed men, who had routed the enemy outposts the day before. Despite being almost overwhelmed by a shower of javelins and stones and the difficulty of the ascent, he was the first to reach the top of the lower level and as soon as he reached level ground, he dislodged the light-armed enemy who were skirmishers and were unaccustomed to hand-to-hand fight. They were driven against the line on the higher level of the hill. Scipio divided his men, making a detour to the left and sending the rest, led by Laelius, round the right of the hill to find a less difficult ascent. He charged the enemy's right wing, throwing it into disorder before it could turn to face him. Meanwhile, Laelius reached the top on the other side. The elephants panicked. There was no space for a flight because the Romans blocked the roads and the camp gate was obstructed by the flight of Hasdrubal and his chief officers. The enemy was routed and lost 8,000 men.

There is a chronological discrepancy between the two writers. Polybius placed these events in 208 BC, whereas Livy placed them in 209 BC. Livy said that he refused to think that Scipio remained idle in 209 BC. Both authors wrote that Scipio seized the camp and the prisoners were 10,000 infantry and 2,000 cavalry. Livy added that he sent the native ones home and sold the African ones and that the native prisoners saluted him as king. Polybius wrote that it was the tribes in the area who were still Carthaginian allies and now came in to submit to the Romans who saluted him as a king. Both wrote that he said that he did not want to be called king and that he wanted to be called "imperator" (victorious commander). This shows that Scipio was held in high regard. According to Polybius, it was here that Edeco made his obeisance. Livy added that Scipio gave presents to the Hispanic chieftains and invited Indibilis to pick 300 of the captured horses. One of the African prisoners turned out to be the nephew of Masinissa, the commander of the Numidian cavalry troops allied with the Carthaginians and the son of the king of Numidia. Scipio allowed him to return to his uncle and gave him an escort.

Scipio considered that pursuing Hasdrubal was risky. Mago and the other Hasdrubal might join him. He sent a division to occupy the Pyrenees to observe the movements of Hasdrubal. According to Livy he spent the rest of the summer receiving the submission of the local tribes. According to Polybius the season was advanced had he went to Tarraco for the winter. The surviving fragments of Polybius on these events end here. In Livy a few days after the Battle of Baecula, when Scipio had descended from the pass of Castulo on his way to Tarraco, Hasdrubal Gisgo and Mago, came to join forces with Hasdrubal. They were too late. They held a council to discuss measures to continue the war. Hasdrubal Gisgo considered that the peoples along the distant southern coast of Hispania were unaware of the Roman victories and was still faithful to Carthage. The two men thought that moving their Hispanic troops to the further corner of Hispania or to Gaul would prevent the desertions caused by Scipio's generous treatment of the locals. Without waiting for approval by the Carthaginian senate they decided that Hasdrubal Barca must proceed to Italy, thus removing all the Hispanic soldiers out of Hispania and 'far beyond the spell of Scipio's name.' His army, weakened by losses and defections was to be brought back to full strength. Mago was to hand over his army to Hasdrubal Gisgo, and go the Balearic Isles to hire mercenaries there. Hasdrubal Gisgo was to go to Lusitania and avoid any collisions with the Romans. A selected force of 3,000 cavalry was to be assembled for Masinissa to cross western Hispania to assist the friendly tribes and ravage hostile territories. The three commanders left to execute their tasks.

In Livy's chronology, it appears that there was no fighting in Hispania in 208 BC. The command of Publius Scipio and Marcus Silanus was extended for one year and Scipio was ordered to send 50 of the 80 ships he either brought to Hispania or captured from Cartago Nova to Sardinia due to concerns about Carthage preparing naval attacks against Italy, Sicily and Sardinia. Livy resumed his account of events in Hispania by noting that the expedition of Hasdrubal shifted the burden of war to Italy and brought relief to Hispania. In 207 BC, "war was suddenly renewed in that country, which was quite as formidable as the previous one." Hasdrubal Gisgo had withdrawn to Gades (Cádiz) by the Strait of Gibraltar and Scipio controlled the east coast. A new commander, Hanno, replaced Hasdrubal Barca and brought a fresh army from Africa. He marched to Celtiberia (in east-central Hispania, next to Roman territory) and raised a large army. Scipio sent Silanus with 10,000 infantry and 500 cavalry against him. His progress was hampered by bad roads and narrow mountain passes. Some Celtiberian deserters acted as guides and he found the location of the enemy. When he was ten miles away he was told that there were two camps along his road. The one on the left had 9,000 Celtiberians and the one on the right had the Carthaginians. The latter had outposts and the usual precautions. The former was undisciplined and poorly guarded. Silanus decided to attack the Celtiberians first and kept to the left to elude the Carthaginian outposts.

Silanus got three miles from the camp unnoticed. He stopped in a valley where he could not be seen, prepared for battle and advanced. The enemy was caught by surprise. Mago heard the shouts and went to take charge of this camp. The main Celtiberian strength were 4,000 men with shields and 200 cavalry. Mago placed them at the front and keep the rest, who were lightly armed, as reserve. He came out of the camp, but there was a shower of javelins when they had hardly crossed the rampart. The Celtiberians stopped to avoid them and threw theirs. The Romans overlapped their shields as protection and closed up, starting a sword-to-sword fight. The enemy found that their customary mobility and agility was useless on the uneven ground. The Romans, instead, were used to stationary combat and their only inconvenience was that their ranks were sometimes broken when moving through narrow places or patches of brushwood. There they had to fight singly or in pairs. However, these obstacles also obstructed the enemy's flight. When the Celtiberians were almost defeated, they were joined by the Carthaginian light infantry from the other camp. Both were defeated. Only 2,000 infantry and all the cavalry escaped with Mago almost at the beginning of the battle. Hanno, the second in command, was captured along with those who had joined the battle when it was almost over. Those who escaped reached Hasdrubal in the area of Gades (Cádiz). The newly recruited Celtiberians went back home. The victory stopped the Celtiberians from siding with Carthage. Scipio advanced into Baetica (the area of the River Baetis Guadalquivir, in southern Hispania) to confront Hasdrubal Gisgo who was encamped in that area to secure the loyalty of his allies. Because of Scipio's advance he went back to Gades and then distributed his forces to various towns for their protection.

When Scipio saw this, he sent his brother, Lucius Scipio, with 10,000 infantry and 1,000 cavalry, to attack Orongi, a town of the Maessesses and the richest city in that area. Hasdrubal had used it as his base to make incursions on the inland tribes. Livy wrote that the Maessesses were a tribe of the Bastetani. However, this is doubtful. Lucius Scipio encamped near the city and sent men to try to persuade the townsfolk to side with the Romans. This failed and he built a double line of circumvallation and formed his army into three divisions to rotate the military tasks. When the first division advanced there was a desperate fight. Lucius Scipio withdrew it and brought forward the other two. The townsfolk withdrew from the wall and the Carthaginian garrison, thinking that the town has been betrayed, formed a compact body. The townsfolk, fearing a massacre if the Romans broke through, opened one of the city gates, went out, held their shields in case of a javelin attack and showed their empty right hands to point out that they had no swords. This was misunderstood and they were attacked and cut down as though they were a hostile army. The Romans entered through the open gate and smashed the other ones. There was no bloodshed and no plundering. The enemy lost 2,000 men; the Romans lost 90. Publius Scipio considered the capture of Orongis as great an achievement as his own capture of Cartago Nova. With winter approaching, he withdrew from southern Hispania, sent the troops to winter quarters and his brother to Rome and wintered in Tarraco.

In 206 BC, Hasdrubal Gisgo, whom Livy described as 'the greatest and most brilliant commander who held command in this war' had moved from Gades to renew the war. He conducted levies with the help of Mago, the son of Hamilcar, and had 50,000 infantry and 4,500 cavalry. Livy noted that some of his sources wrote that he had 70,000 infantry. Hasdrubal and Mago encamped in a wide and open plain suitable for battle near a town that Livy called Silpia but Polybius called Ilipa, 10 miles north of Hispalis (Seville), and on the right bank of the River Baetis (Guadalquivir). Scipio felt that he could not face this large army without his native auxiliaries to give an appearance of greater strength, but he did not want to rely on them too much in case they changed sides like what happened to his uncle. Culchas, who had authority over 28 towns had promised a force of infantry and cavalry. Marcus Junius Silanus was sent to fetch them. Scipio marched from Tarraco to Castulo picking up small forces from the friendly tribes along the way. He was joined by Silanus there with Chulcas' 3,000 infantry and 500 cavalry. His entire army had 55,000 men. Livy wrote that Scipio advanced to meet the enemy and took up position near Beacula.

Livy's writing gives the impression that the skirmishes that developed into a full battle that he described occurred at Baecula. However, this was not the case. In 28.12.14 Livy wrote that the Carthaginian commanders were encamped near Silpia (ilipa), which was 130 miles further west. Livy did not mention a long march by these commanders. Therefore, there is no explanation as to why Mago and the Numidians (see below) would have attacked Scipio at Baecula. Moreover, he also wrote that the enemy encamped there on level ground, which was suitable for battle, whereas Baecula was not on level ground and was not suited for the kind of battle that followed. In the account of Polybius Scipio left Castulo with his whole army and "when he got near the Carthaginians and was in full sight of them he encamped on certain low hills opposite to the enemy." There is no mention of Baecula. Thus, this must have been at Ilipa and what both authors described was the Battle of Ilipa. In Polybius, Scipio found his situation embarrassing because the allied troops he had were not enough for him to risk a battle and it seemed dangerous to 'rely on the support of the allies in what promised to be a decisive engagement.' He was forced by circumstances to employ the natives, whose role would be to impress the enemy, while the actual fighting would be down to his legions.

Livy wrote that while encamping, Scipio was attacked by Mago and Masinissa with the whole of their cavalry. Polybius specified that Mago thought it favourable to attack while the Romans were preparing their camp and that he would catch Scipio off guard. However, Scipio anticipated this and placed his cavalry, which was equal in numbers, under a hill. Caught by surprise, those who came close to the lines and attacked the parties digging the Roman entrenchments were routed. In Livy, the engagement with the other Carthaginians who were advancing in order was indecisive for a long time, while in Polybius the Carthaginian resistance was short. In Livy, the light infantry came out from the outposts and the entrenchment parties picked their weapons. More and more men came to relieve the wearied soldiers. The enemy withdrew in an orderly manner, but when they were pressed further they fled. Skirmishes between cavalry and light infantry on both sides to test each other's strength lasted for several days.

After this, both sides lined up for battle in front of their camp until sunset and then returned to their camp. They repeated this for several days. As both sides had their own troops in the centre and the native auxiliaries on the wings Scipio thought that it was assumed that this would be the order of battle. Therefore, he changed the line-up for the day he intended to fight, placing the Romans on the wings.

Polybius was more specific. He wrote that Scipio used two strategies, both consisted of acting in the opposite of the Carthaginians. One was a change of his line-up and the other was the timing of the battle. Hasdrubal repeatedly lined up the Africans in the centre to oppose the Romans and the Hispanics on the wings with the elephants in front of them. He drew up his men at a later hour. In the pre-battle moves Scipio had done the same. For the battle, instead, he drew up at dawn and lined up the Romans on the wings and the Hispanics in the centre. These two stratagems 'much contributed to the victory of his own army and the discomfiture of the enemy.' Scipio sent messages to his officers to have breakfast, get armed and march out of camp. In Livy, the messages were given the previous evening, in Polybius this happened as soon as it was light. Livy also mentioned the horses being fed, bitted and saddled and the cavalry got fully armed. Scipio sent out the cavalry and the light infantry. In Polybius, they got close to the enemy's camp and threw javelins. In Livy, they attacked the enemy's outposts. Scipio then advanced with the heavy infantry as the sun was rising. When he reached the middle of the plain he lined up his men in the mentioned opposite way round. The Carthaginians scarcely had the time to arm themselves, and had to deploy without preparation and without having had breakfast. In Livy, the enemy cavalry went out to respond to the Roman preliminary attack. In Polybius, the light infantry was also sent out. Then the heavy infantry was drawn up on level ground close to the foot of the hill in the usual order.

The cavalry fight went on for some time without either side gaining the advantage. Both sides were in turn driven back, withdrew among their infantry and then resumed the attack. When the two infantry forces were half a mile from each other, Scipio recalled his cavalry and the infantry at the centre opened up passages to let them through. Scipio then divided them into two bodies, which he placed behind the wings as a reserve. It was time for the battle proper and he ordered the Hispanics in the centre to advance slowly. He extended the right wing he commanded to the right and got the left wing to extend the left. In other words, the wings were stretched outwards. They had three cohorts of infantry, three troops of cavalry and the light infantry. The light infantry and the cavalry were to engage the enemy before the two centres had time to get close. They were led at a rapid pace, while the centre followed them obliquely. The Roman line curved inwards towards the centre because of the slower advance of the Hispanic auxiliaries. By this time the wings were already engaged, the enemy centre with the main strength of the enemy, the veteran Carthaginians and Africans, had not yet come within range. It did not dare to leave their lines to help the wings for fear of being exposed to the advancing enemy centre. The allied wings of the Carthaginians were pressed by a pincer attack as the Roman cavalry and light infantry turned around and a made an attack on the flanks, while the heavy infantry was charging at the front, trying to detach them from the centre.

Polybius gave other details about Scipio's manoeuvres. The Roman infantry was inactive during the indecisive fight between the light infantry. Scipio then placed the light infantry behind the heavy infantry and in front of the horses. He made a direct frontal advance, but when at a distance of four stades (c. 630–700 m.) he ordered the centre to proceed at the same speed and got the right wing to turn right and the left wing to turn left. He advanced on the enemy wings with his wings at a rapid pace, moving them in the mentioned directions and with the light infantry in front followed by the cavalry and three maniples of heavy infantry. Meanwhile, the centre advanced in a straight line at a slower pace. When he got close he fell directly on the enemy wings. The two wings turned in the opposite directions, towards the enemy wings. After this the light infantry and the cavalry at the front of the right wing turned right and the heavy infantry at the rear turned left. The front was to outflank the enemy, while the rear was to attack frontally. On the left wing the front turned left and the rear turned right. As a result, the right of the front on both wings became their left. Scipio led the right wing and Lucius Marcius and Marcus Silanus led the left wing.

The elephants were attacked by the missiles of the cavalry and harassed on their side by the light infantry. In distress, they caused as much damage to the Carthaginian wings as to the enemy, 'they destroyed all, friend or foe, who came in their way'. The infantry on the wings was broken. The centre was of no use because they could not leave their line to help the wings because of the advance of the native auxiliaries of the Romans. At the same time, they could not operate effectively in their position because the enemy in front of them would not engage. The wings kept up the fight for some time because the outcome of the battle depended on the fight on these two sides. As the day got hotter the Carthaginians grew faint as they had not been able to prepare themselves properly, while, at the same time, the best troops of the Romans were engaging the weaker troops of the enemy. The Carthaginians at first withdrew step by step, but then gave way in a body and withdrew to the foot of the hill and when the Romans renewed their pressure, they fled in rout to their camp. Then it started raining so heavily that the Romans had to make way to their camp with difficulty. Only four fragments of Polybius' account of this battle have survived and the information we have from him ends here.

Livy also wrote that the battle was not evenly matched due to the Hispanic auxiliaries of the Carthaginians having to fight against the Romans and the Latin allies. He added that as the day wore on, the strength of the Carthaginians began to fail because they had not had a chance to have breakfast. Scipio had delayed the beginning of the battle proper for this reason. His charge started only after noon. The battle reached the centre considerably later, so that the noon heat, the strain of standing under arms, hunger and thirst weakened the Carthaginians and Africans before they started fighting. By then, the elephants had been put into a panic and the action of the light infantry had shifted from the wings to the centre. The weakened centre retreated, keeping their ranks. On seeing this, the Romans charged even harder on all sides. Hasdrubal tried to hold the line, but in the end his men fled up the hill behind them and then to their camp. The camp would have been taken had it not been for an extraordinary downpour. During the night, the Carthaginians raised their earthwork with the local stones. However, their allies began deserting, starting with Attenes, prince of the Turdetani, who lived along the south bank of the River Baetis. Two fortified towns were handed over to the Romans with their garrisons. Fears of more widespread desertions led Hasdrubal to move his camp the following night.

Scipio sent his cavalry on the pursuit and followed with his army. They took a shorter route along the River Baetis on the advice of guides so that they could attack him if he tried to ford. Finding the river closed to him, Hasdrubal hurried towards the coast. The Roman cavalry and light infantry slowed him down, attacking the flank and rear of his army, forcing him to stop to repulse first the cavalry and then the light infantry until he fled to the nearest hills with 6,000 men, many of whom were unarmed. The rest were killed or captured. The Carthaginians hastily improvised an entrenchment at the top of the hill and the Romans did not attempt the steep ascent. However, the area was barren and unsuited to sustaining a siege. There were many desertions. Hasdrubal, who was not far from the coast, called for his ships and fled at night. Scipio left Marcus Silianus to continue the siege with 10,000 infantry and 1,000 cavalry and returned with the rest of his force to Tarraco. Along the way, he checked the disposition of the tribal chiefs so that they could be rewarded as they deserved. Masinissa came to a secret understanding with Marcus Silianus and went to Africa to induce his people to defect to Rome. He would remain loyal to Rome for the rest of his life. Hasdrubal sailed to Gades in the ships Mago had sent back for him, and the rest of the abandoned army broke up. Some went over to Rome and others dispersed among the nearby tribes. The Carthaginians were expelled from Hispania, Marcus Silianus went back to Scipio and reported that the end of the war.

Scipio undertook a forced march from Tarraco to Cartago Nova. Then, he left for Africa to pursue an alliance with Syphax in preparation for a campaign against Carthage (in today's Tunisia). He left Marcus Silianus and Lucius Marcius in charge at Tarraco and Cartago Nova. After concluding a treaty, he returned to Cartago Nova. He felt that the time to punish Castulo and Iliturgi had arrived. They had defected to Carthage when the two Scipios died. The latter betrayed and put to death the fugitives from those Romans routs. Scipio sent Lucius Marcius with a third of the force to besiege Castulo and he marched on Iliturgi himself. He besieged the town. Attacks on the city walls were repeatedly repulsed, but the city eventually fell. Some African deserters, who were now serving with the Romans, saw that the highest part of the city, which was protected by steep cliffs, was left undefended and unfortified. They climbed the cliff using iron hooks as steps and entered the town, which the Romans had already seized. Resentment led to the massacre of everyone, including women and children. The town was set on fire and what was not burnt was destroyed. Scipio then went to Castulo, which was defended by Iberians from other places and the remnants of the Carthaginian army. There was discord between the Iberians and the Carthaginians. The commander of the latter betrayed the city and this prevented a slaughter.

Lucius Marcius was sent to control those tribes that had not yet been subjugated. He crossed the River Baetis; two cities surrendered. However, Astapa was a Carthaginian ally, hated the Romans and carried out brigandage raids on the neighbours who were Roman allies and captured Romans traders. When the Romans got close, the townsfolk piled up their most precious possessions in a heap, got their wives and children to sit on top and put wood around them. Fifty men were put on their guard. Then they opened the gates and made a sortie. A few cavalry were sent against them and were routed. Then the Roman veterans charged, but the enemy was determined to die and did not give ground. The Romans extended their line and outflanked them. The townsfolk fought in a compact body and were all killed. In the town, the women and children were burnt by the guards who then threw themselves in the fire. After accepting the surrender of the remaining cities, Lucius Marcius returned to Cartago Nova. Deserters from Gades came and promised to betray the city, the Carthaginian garrison and the ships in the harbour. Mago had gathered a considerable force. Some were brought from Africa, across the strait, and some were brought by Hanno from the nearby tribes. Scipio sent Lucius Marcius with some light infantry contingents and Gaius Laelius with eight ships.

Scipio fell ill and there were rumours that he had died. Mandonius and Indibilis called on their people to revolt, raised a Celtiberian force and ravaged the land of the Suessetani and Sedetani, who were Roman allies. There was a mutiny of Roman soldiers in a camp near Sucro (on today's River Jucar, south of Valencia). They were unhappy that they were still in Hispania even though the war had ended and demanded their pay. The soldiers gave the command of the camp to the chief ringleaders of the mutiny, two common soldiers. When confirmation of Scipio's death did not arrive the ringleaders were abandoned by their followers. Scipio sent seven officers to announce that he was alive and well. They told the soldiers that their demand for pay was reasonable and that they would put it to Scipio, who sent collectors among the tributary tribes to raise the money for this. Scipio then summoned the soldiers to New Carthage to receive the pay. The ringleaders were executed and the soldiers were reprimanded and then given their pay.

In the meantime, Lucius Marcius defeated Hanno, Mago's prefect, who had been sent from Gades (Cádiz) with a small force of Africans to hire local mercenaries and had armed 4,000 young men. Hanno escaped. Gaius Laelius' ships reached Carteia, in the Bay of Gibraltar. Some men offered to surrender Gades, but the plot was discovered and Mago arrested them and sent them to Carthage in a convoy of ships. When this passed the Strait of Gibraltar Laelius pursued it. There was a battle made chaotic by the current. Four Carthaginian ships were sunk and five fled to Africa. Back onshore, Laelius learnt that the plot had been discovered. He and Lucius Marcius agreed that they were wasting time and returned to Cartago Nova. Mago sent news of the mutiny of the Roman camp and the Illergete revolt to Carthage and urged for aid to be sent for the re-conquest of Hispania.

Mandonius and Indibilis, who had withdrawn, resumed hostilities with 20,000 infantry and 2,500 cavalry and attacked Sedetania. Scipio marched on them and he got near their camp, which was in a narrow valley. He sent some cattle towards it and hid the cavalry behind a mountain spur. It was to charge when the light infantry engaged the enemy in a skirmish. The enemy rushed to seize the cattle. There was some skirmishing and when a sword fight started the cavalry came in. It made a frontal attack and some cavalrymen went round the foot of the mountain to cut off the retreat of the enemy. There was more slaughter than usual for a skirmish. The next day the enemy lined up for battle at dawn. Due to the valley being narrow part of their men were on the slope of a hill, rather than in the plain. Fighting on a narrow front was more adapted to Roman tactics. The enemy line could not fight at full strength and their cavalry was rendered useless. The Roman cavalry was sent to make a detour around the hill because it had no room to outflank the enemy. Scipio quickly led the charge of the infantry so that the manoeuvre would not be noticed. The cavalry reached the enemy's rear and there were two separate fights because the narrowness of the valley prevented a link up. The Roman infantry routed the enemy infantry, which could not rely on the support of its cavalry. The enemy was slaughtered and only the troops on the hill, which had not fought, managed to escape. The Romans lost 2,000 men and 3,000 were wounded; 3,000 of the enemy were seized. Indibilis begged for clemency and pleaded loyalty if he was spared a second time. Scipio replied that he would spare him, but that if he revolted again he would 'feel the weight of his arm'. He imposed an indemnity to pay his troops.

Scipio sent Marcus Silianus to Tarraco and Lucius Marcius to southern Hispania. He then joined the latter as he was approaching the coast. Scipio wanted to go to Gades to meet Masinissa and conclude an alliance with him. Lucius Marcius informed Masinissa that Scipio was coming. Masinissa persuaded Mago to let him go to the mainland for some plundering (at that time Cádiz was on an island). When the two men met Masinissa thanked Scipio for sending his nephew back home and pledged his help if Rome sent Scipio to Africa. He thought that if he did Carthage would be defeated. Scipio then returned to Tarraco. Mago lost all hope for Hispania and was preparing to leave. He received orders from Carthage to take his fleet in Gades to Italy, raise an army and assist Hannibal there. Sailing along the coast he landed a force near Cartago Nova and plundered the nearest fields. Then he took his fleet to the city, thinking that it was held only by a small Roman garrison and hoping for the support of the townsfolk. He attacked the city wall. The city gate was opened and the Romans burst out. Thrown into confusion, the enemy fled, was pursued to the shore and suffered heavy losses. The fastests of the survivors rescued themselves by boarding the moored ships. The crew, out of fear for being boarded by the pursuing enemy, drew in the ladders, cut the hawsers and left in the darkness. Those who tried to swim to the ships could not see them and drowned. When Mago returned to Gades the city gates were closed to him. He anchored nearby and complained. He was told that the townsfolk had done this because they were angry about the pillaging by the soldiers when they embarked. Mago summoned the town officials, who were executed. Then he went to the Balearic Islands to winter there. He was repulsed by the inhabitants of the bigger island. He went on to the smaller island, which did not have strong defences, and wintered there.

== The wars of resistance against Rome ==
=== From commanders with consular power to praetors as provincial governors ===
When Scipio Africanus returned to Rome after his victory in 206 BC, he recommended that the Roman army should remain in Hispania to prevent a return of the Carthaginians during the rest of the Second Punic War. He had made alliances with local tribes and Rome had the obligation to protect them. However, these alliances could be weak and the allies could be untrustworthy and unpredictable, as the rebellion by Indibilis had shown (see above). Therefore, the continuation of Roman military presence was needed. After the end of this war, the Romans decided to remain in Hispania rather than withdraw. The actions Scipio Africanus had taken had laid the foundation for this permanent presence. He had established permanent garrisons at Tarraco (Tarragona), Cartago Nova (Cartagena) and Gades (Cádiz). He had founded the colony (settlement) of Italica (near Santiponce) to settle wounded Roman veterans. He also changed the Roman army in Hispania from one financed by Rome to a self-sufficient army. He did this through war booty and collections of food, clothes, and other supplies from the local tribes that had rebelled against the Romans. He had grain collected for export to raise money to pay soldiers, and requisitioned food and clothing for the soldiers. There must also have been steps to encourage some areas of Hispania to produce grain for the Romans. Livy mentioned that when Scipio Africanus campaigned in Africa a few years later (at the end of the Second Punic War), grain from Sicily and Sardinia (which were major producers of grain), but also from Hispania was sent to the Roman troops there. Probably some farming areas were oriented towards producing crops to be exported to Rome, particularly in the fertile valleys of the rivers Ebro (in the northern part of the east coast) and Baetis (Guadalquivir) in the south. The presence of Roman soldiers and traders must have started the process of Romanisation. New products and technological innovations were imported. Initially the mentioned requisitions occurred in an ad hoc manner. Later they were extended to all tribes in Roman territory and developed into a form of taxation. The three Scipios who led the Roman campaigns in Hispania had conducted affairs independently for Rome, following the exigencies of war. For seven years, Rome sent military commanders with an irregular constitutional position to Hispania (see next paragraph). When governors, ostensibly under the supervision of the Roman senate, were instituted, the senate had little control over them due to the great distance. Hispania remained governed largely independently by the men on the spot. This left Hispania in the hands of governors and officials who were inexperienced due to lack of knowledge of the provinces and their local people and to the short duration of their offices. It led to abuses, exploitation, and harassment of the local peoples. The senate tried to address this, but failed. The largely unsupervised Roman officials and entrepreneurs became greedy as local resources provided opportunities for enrichment. This was a breeding ground for discontent and rebellion.

In 205 BC, after Scipio Africanus returned to Rome, Lucius Cornelius Lentulus and Lucius Manlius Acidinus were sent to Hispania with proconsular power "without magistracy" ("sine magistratus", without holding public office). This was a constitutional oddity. Normal governors of Roman territories were either praetors, propraetors or proconsuls. The latter were praetors or consuls who were assigned a governorship after their year in office and/or whose imperium (the power to command an army) was extended – the offices of the consuls and praetors conferred the power to command an army. Therefore, Lentulus and Acudinus were sent to Hispania without holding the usual public office, but they were given proconsular power so that they could command the armies in Hispania. This gave the Roman territory in Hispania a somewhat unofficial status. The two men had just the status of military commanders. The manner of their appointment is unknown. This constitutional oddity continued for seven years, until 197 BC, when two provinces were created in Hispania and they were assigned to two praetors as per normal procedure. It looks like Rome may have improvised when she retained this new territory and that the status and form of administration was regularised after seven years. Cornelius Lentulus and Manlius Acidinus stayed in Hispania for an unusually long time. Livy wrote that their command was extended in 202 BC. He does not mention what the arrangements for the previous extra two years were. Probably the two men were sent without a clear term of stay and this was looked into when they had been there or quite a while. In 201 BC, the question of who should take their place was put to the assembly of the people. This was an unusual procedure and was probably a way to give a mandate to people being sent to Hispania without (elected) public office. The reason why this irregular system was continued is not known either. They were to be replaced by only one man, who was to take a legion and 15 cohorts there. The outgoing proconsuls were to bring back home the veterans who had spent a long time in Hispania. Livy did not say what the outcome of the vote was. Only Lentulus went back to Rome. He arrived in 200 BC. In a later passage, Livy wrote that in 200 BC Gaius Cornelius Cethegus was a propraetor in Hispania and defeated a hostile force in the territory of the Sedetani and 15,000 of the enemy died. The question of the replacement for Acidinus was put to the assembly of the people in 200 BC. Gnaeus Cornelius Blasio and Lucius Titus Stertinius were chosen and were sent to Hispania in 199 BC. Acidinus returned to Rome in 199 BC. The idea of having only one man in charge in Hispania might have been connected with the fact that Hannibal had been defeated the year before and with the end of the Second Punic War there was a need to demobilise the Roman armies (particularly in Italy) and discharge the veterans. In 199 BC, the praetor Gaius Sergius was given the task of organising the distribution of land to the soldiers who had served for many years in Sicily, and Sardinia and Hispania. We are not told why this plan to have only one man in charge did not materialise and why Acidinus stayed behind. Also in 199 BC, the people of the city of Gades (Cádiz) in Hispania asked that no prefect should be sent to their town and this was granted (in 206 BC, the Romans had concluded a treaty with Gades in which it was agreed that a Roman centurion was to act as Roman prefect in the town).

In 198 BC, the number of Roman praetors was increased from four to six because it was decided to create two new provinces: Hispania Citerior and Hispania Ulterior. The two capitals were Tarraco (Tarragona) and Curdoba (Córdoba). They were to be headed by praetors and the praetors for 197 BC, Gaius Sempronius Tuditanus and Marcus Helvius, were sent to Hispania Citerior and Ulterior respectively. They were given 8,000 Latin infantry and 400 cavalry each to replace the old soldiers, who were sent back home. They were also given the task of defining the border between the two provinces. Trouble developed as there was a large-scale warlike movement. Late in the year, war broke out in Hispania Ulterior. Helvius informed Rome about two simultaneous but independent rebellions by two chiefs in the area of the River Baetis (Guadalquivir), Culchas and Luxinius. The former was supported by 15 fortified cities and the latter by was supported by two strong cities, Carmo (Carmona) and Bardo, the Malacini and the Sexetani (form the coast in the southeast) and Baeturia (an area between the rivers Baetis and Guadiana). Other peoples had not yet disclosed their intentions, but would soon join the revolt. The senate did not take any immediate action and instead decided to get the new praetors to ask for instructions after they were elected in the forthcoming elections. At the end of the year, soon after the elections of the new consuls and praetors, news arrived that the army of Gaius Sempronius Tuditanus had been routed in Hispania Citerior and that the praetor had been mortally wounded. There is no record of what happened in Hispania Ulterior.

In 196 BC, Hispania Ulterior was assigned to Quintus Fabius Buteo and Hispania Citerior to Quintus Minucius Thermus. They were given one legion each and 4,000 infantry and 300 cavalry each from the Latin allies. They were ordered to leave as soon as possible. Quintus Minucius won a battle against the commanders Budares and Baesadines in which 12,000 of the enemy were killed and Budares was captured. At the same time, Gnaeus Cornelius Blasio and Lucius Stertinius (the two men who were proconsuls in Hispania in 198 BC) returned from Hispania Ulterior and Citerior respectively. The former was granted an ovation (a minor victory celebration) and brought large amounts of silver and gold from the proceeds from the spoils of war. The latter did not ask for a triumph, gave a large amount of silver from his booty to the treasury and used the rest to erect two arches with gilded statues. We do not have any details about the military engagements of these two men.

=== The campaign of Marcus Portius Cato (the Elder) ===
At the end of 196 BC, it was decided that, with war in Hispania raging, a consul with a consular army of two legions plus 15,000 Latin infantry and 800 cavalry transported by 20 ships was needed. Hispania was assigned to Cato the Elder. The praetors Appius Claudius Nero and Publius Manlius were given Hispania Ulterior and Citerior respectively and the latter was to be an assistant to the consul. They were allowed to levy 2,000 infantry and 200 cavalry each to add to the legion each of their predecessors had in Hispania. A dispatch arrived from Quintus Minucius Thermus, the praetor in Hispania Citerior, announcing that he had defeated the enemy commanders Budar and Baesadines near the city of Turda, that the former had been captured and that the enemy had lost 12,000 men. We have no record of what happened in Hispania Citerior in 196 BC.

In 195 BC, Cato sailed to Rhoda (modern Rosas, by the Pyrenees) a port of the Massiliote (the people of the Greek city of Massalia, Marseille, who were friends of Rome) and expelled the Hispanic garrison that held the fort. He then landed at Emporiae (or Ampurias, an ancient town nearby), a port where there were two settlements, one of (friendly) Greeks, and one of locals. He stayed there for three days to gather intelligence and to start drilling his troops He sent the redemptores (Roman merchants who followed the army) back to Rome, saying that 'war feeds itself' and on leaving Emporiae he pillaged the enemy's fields at a time when the grain was ready for threshing and spread "terror and flight in all directions".

Meanwhile, Marcus Helvius, the praetor of Hispania Ulterior for 198 BC, was on his way from that province to Cato's camp with an escort of 6,000 men sent by Appius Claudius Nero (the praetor of that province for that year, 195 BC). He had remained in Hispania after handing over his praetorship of that province to Quintus Minucius Thermus in 196 BC because of a 'long and dangerous illness'. Along the way he came across and defeated a large force of 20,000 Celtiberians near an unspecified town of Iliturgi. The enemy lost 12,000 men, the town was seized and all the adult males were killed. Marcus Helvius then reached Cato's camp, sent the escort back to Hispania Ulterior and returned to Rome only two months after the return of his successor (Quintus Minucius). He was granted an ovation (a minor victory celebration) instead of a triumph (a full scale celebration) because he had fought under another commander's jurisdiction and returned to Rome two years after the expiry of his tenure in office. He brought back significant amounts of silver coins and uncoined silver. Quintus Minucius celebrated a triumph and brought back much larger amounts of silver coins and uncoined silver.

The Ilergetes, in the north of Hispania Citerior, a loyal tribe, was under attack. They sent three envoys to ask for Roman help. Cato did not want to split his army to come to their help because an enemy force was near and a battle was impending. Since the envoys were distraught, he told them that he would help them and pretended to embark 3,000 soldiers for this. The ambassadors were satisfied and left. Cato disembarked his men and went into winter quarters three miles from Emporiae. He sent his troops to plunder the enemy's fields, marching them at night so as to cover as much distance as possible and to catch the enemy by surprise at dawn. This was to harden his freshly levied men. The enemy did not dare to venture out of their fortifications.

Cato then decided to engage the enemy's camp, setting off at midnight, again to catch the enemy by surprise. He went round the rear of the camp, lined up his men at dawn and sent three contingents to the camp's rampart. The enemy was surprised that the Romans were behind their line. Cato ordered the contingents to withdraw to draw the enemy out of their camp on the chase. It worked, and as they were forming ranks Cato deployed the cavalry from the wings. However, those of the right wing were repulsed and their retreat created panic in the infantry. Cato ordered two picked contingents to go round the enemy's right so that they showed up at their rear before the infantry became engaged. This made the battle more even because the enemy had to watch their rear as well. Still, the infantry and cavalry of the right wing became so dispirited that they started withdrawing, making it difficult for the Romans to hold their line. The left wing pressed the enemy back and the contingents at their rear were causing panic. A sword-to-sword fight started. As the troops were getting tired, Cato called in the reserve and the front was reformed. The enemy line was broken and they fled towards their camp. Cato now engaged the second legion. The Romans could not reach the rampant due to stones and javelins being thrown at them. Cato saw that the left gate of the camp was thinly defended and sent the second legion there. It broke through and may of the enemy were killed.

After the battle, Cato allowed his men a few hours' rest and then he despoiled the fields in the area, which forced the settlement of locals in Emporiae and those who had sought refuge there to surrender. Cato allowed them to return home and then set off for Tarraco (Tarragona). All the communities along the way surrendered and by the time he got there all of Hispania north of the River Ebro was subjugated. However, there were false rumours that he wanted to march on Turdetania and that he was already on his way spread among the tribes of the mountains. Seven forts of the Bergistani (who lived in the north of Hispania Citerior) revolted. They were reduced to submission without any serious fighting. Cato returned to Tarraco, but they rebelled again and this time, when he defeated them again, he sold all into slavery to discourage further rebellion.

Meanwhile, the praetor Publius Manlius marched into Turdetania with the army he had taken over from Quintus Minucius, joining it with the force the other praetor, Appius Claudius Nero, had in Hispania Ulterior. The reason why Manlius, who had been sent to Hispania Citerior as consular assistant, should campaign in Hispania Ulterior and also take the command of the troops of the praetor of the other province in unclear. Moreover, the mentioned rumour of an attack on Turdetania by the Romans may not have been unfounded, and there may have been a mistake about who was going to lead it and which of the two Turdetanias (see note 78) to attack. The Turdetani were considered the least warlike tribe, and were easily defeated. However, they hired 10,000 Celtiberian mercenaries. Meanwhile, Cato, worried by the rising of the Bergistani and possible uprisings by other tribes, disarmed all the peoples north of the Ebro. This caused resentment. He levelled the walls of all the cities in a day. All but one (Segestica, which was taken by storm) surrendered. Publius Manlius, who was having a hard time with the Celtiberian mercenaries, asked Cato for help. Cato found that the Turdetani and the Celtiberians were in separate camps. The patrols of the former were defeated in skirmishes. Cato then sent three officers to the Celtiberians to offer them three choices: to receive double pay from the Romans, to return home with the guarantee of no reprisals, or to set a date and place for a battle. The Celtiberians could not decide. Cato sent contingents to plunder the fields of an area that had not yet been attacked. Next he marched to Segestia (Siguenza) because he heard that the baggage of the Celtiberians had been left there. As the Celtiberians still did not move he returned with an escort to the Ebro, leaving he whole of his army in the praetor's camp.

Cato captured several towns with his small force. The Sedetani, Ausetani, and Suessetani near the River Ebro went over to him. The Lancetani, fearing retribution by the tribes they had raided while Cato was away remained in arms. Due to this behaviour, Cato attacked them. He stopped his men just less than half a mile from one of their towns. He left some contingents to guard the camp and advanced with the rest around the other side of the town. He sent his native auxiliaries who were mostly Suessetani (now allies), to advance to the city walls. When the Lancetani recognised them and, remembering that they had often raided their fields, they opened the city gates and rushed against them. Cato entered the city with his force through the open gate, which the enemy had forgotten to close. The Lancetani had to surrender.

Cato then went to the town of Vergium, which was a haunt for brigands who raided peaceful districts. The town leader, Vergestanus, disavowed any complicity with them. The brigands had made themselves masters of the town. Cato told him to return to the town, make up an excuse for his absence and then seize the citadel while the Romans were keeping the brigands busy with their attack. The brigands found themselves with the double threat of the Roman attack and the capture of the citadel. Cato seized the city and ordered that the people in the citadel and their relatives were to be set free and retain their property. The rest of the townsfolk were sold into slavery. The brigands were executed. After pacifying the province, Cato organised the operation of the iron and silver mines efficiently. This produced considerable revenue and made the province richer. He then went back to Rome.

=== Continuation of the resistance ===
Cato claimed that he had pacified Hispania. Yet, the year after he went back to Rome there were more serious rebellions. Thus, reality on the ground was different, and, due to Hispania being far away, the senate could be badly informed about the situation there. Cato's actions actually sowed the seeds for further rebellion. His heavy handedness was resented. Moreover, he further promoted agricultural production to supply the Roman army. This transformed some of the tribes in the Roman territories from pastoral and nomadic or semi nomadic societies into settled agricultural ones. Many young people who lost their traditional warrior lifestyle became mercenaries, auxiliary soldiers for the Roman army, bandits or rebels. Outside Roman territory there were fears about possible Roman encroachment inland. This was fertile ground for rebellions.

In 194 BC, the praetors Publius Cornelius Scipio Nasica and Sextus Digitus were assigned Hispania Ulterior and Citerior respectively. Sextus Digitus "fought battles, numerous rather than memorable, with the tribes who had, in great numbers, revolted after the departure of Marcus Cato." He lost half of his army. All of Hispania would have rebelled had not Scipio Nasica won many battles south of the River Ebro, resulting in the surrender of 50 towns. He fell upon a large gang of Lusitanian bandits who were on their way back home from plundering Hispania Ulterior carrying their booty. This was near the city of Ilipa (Alcala del Rio, near Seville). His fresh and compact force fought against a long column that was hindered by many pack animals, and was tired from a long march. At first, the Lusitanians threw the Romans into confusion. Then the battle became more even, and eventually, the Romans won and pursued the fugitives. The Lusitanians lost 12,000 men and 140 men, mainly cavalrymen, were captured. The Romans lost 73 men.

In 193 BC, the praetors Gaius Flaminius and Marcus Fulvius Nobilitor were assigned Hispania Citerior and Ulterior respectively. Gaius Flaminius was a veteran who had fought in Hispania during the Second Punic War. Because of the events of the previous year some friends told Gaius Flaminius that a great war had flared up in Hispania. He had little confidence in the troops of Sextus Digitus and asked the senate to give him a legion from Rome to supplement the scared remnant of this army in addition to the force he had been allowed to levy. This would have given him a total of 6,200 infantry and 300 cavalry, which he thought sufficient to carry on the campaign. The senate refused, saying that it could not pass decrees on the basis of rumours invented by private individuals to gratify officials. It would accept only reports from officers in Hispania. It added that in case of an emergency in Hispania he should raise emergency troops outside Italy. Gaius Flaminius sailed to Sicily to conduct a levy.

Then, on his way to Hispania, a storm carried him to Africa and he recruited veterans who had settled there after the Second Punic War. He added a contingent in Hispania to the two from Sicily and Africa. When he arrived in Hispania he found that the report had been an exaggeration. For unknown reasons he seized the Oretani city of Inlucia. The Oretani lived in today's region of La Mancha (in south central Spain) and the eastern part of the Sierra Morena, outside Roman territory. He then took his troops to their winter stations. During the winter he fought several battles against raiding parties of brigands. Livy thought that they were unworthy of record and that Marcus Fulvius did greater things. Marcus Fulvius Nobilitor undertook a campaign against an alliance of Vaccaei (from the northwest of central Hispania), Vettones (from west-central Hispania) and Celtiberians near Toletum (Toledo, in central Hispania), which was 200 km (125 miles) north of his province. He must have left the Baetis (Guadalquivir) Valley and crossed the Sierra Morena. He routed the armies of these tribes and captured alive Hilernus. Livy said that he was their king. However, it is highly unlikely that the three peoples had a common king.

In 192 BC, Marcus Baebius Tamphilus and Aulus Atilius Serranus were assigned Hispania Citerior and Ulterior respectively. However, they were reassigned to the command of Bruttium (Calabria, the toe of Italy) and of the fleet in Greece respectively. Gaius Flaminus and Marcus Fulvius Nobilitor retained their posts. The two praetors fought in the right praetorial order, Gaius Flaminius took the wealthy Vaccaei city of Licabrum by storm and captured the chief Conribilo alive. Fulvius Nobilitor won two battles and seized the towns of Vescelia (Vilches) and Helo and many forts, while others surrendered voluntarily. He then marched on the Oretani (in the southeast of central Hispania) and seized Noliba and Cusibis. Several other towns surrendered. After this he then advanced to River Tagus and attacked Toletum (Toledo). The Vettones sent a large army to relieve it but he routed them and captured the city.

In 191 BC, the term Gaius Flaminius was extended and Lucius Aemilius Paulus replaced Marcus Fulvius Nobilitor in Hispania Ulterior. The two praetors were to serve for two years because the war in Greece against Antiochus III had begun. They were allowed to have additional fresh troops, 3,000 infantry and 300 cavalry, and two-thirds of these were to be Latin allies. Lucius Aemilius lost a battle against the Lusitanians in the territory of the Vastitani at the town of Lycon (location unknown). He found it difficult to defend his camp and lost 6,000 men. He retreated by forced march to a friendly country. He raised an army by a hasty levy (probably an irregular force) and fought a pitched battle against the Lusitanians. They were routed; they lost 18,000 men and 3,300 were captured. This 'made matters more tranquil' in Hispania. We know through an inscription that Lucius Aemilius besieged the city of Hasta (a town in Turdetania, near Jerez de la Frontera). Facing stiff resistance, he encouraged a revolt of the slaves of the city, decreeing that they would be freed and given the land they worked on if they revolted. It worked, the city was delivered to him and he kept his promise. We know this through an inscription found near Alcala del los Gazules, 80 km east of Cádiz.

In 189 BC, Publius Junius Brutus and Lucius Plautius Hypsaeus were the praetors of Hispania Ulterior and Citerior respectively. Publius Iunius was reassigned from Etruria to Hispania when Lucius Baebius Dives (who had been assigned to Hispania Ulterior) died in Massalia (Marseilles) on his way to Hispania when he was attacked by Ligurians. Lucius Baebius had been given reinforcements of 6,000 Latin infantry and 200 cavalry. Lucius Plautius Hypsaeus was given 2,000 Roman and 2,000 Latin infantry and 200 cavalry. The two men were surprised to find the situation quiet in Hispania. Lucius Aemilius' victory brought temporary peace.

In 188 BC, Lucius Manlius Acidinus Fulvianus and Gaius Atinius were the praetors of Hispania Citerior and Ulterior respectively. They were given more troops; 3,000 infantry and 200 cavalry were added to each provincial legion. Initially, things were quiet, but in 187 BC, the two praetors informed Rome that Celtiberians and Lusitanians were in arms and were ravaging the lands of the allies. Gaius Atinius fought the Lusitanians near Hasta, defeated them, killing 6,000 of them, and seized their camp. He then attacked Hasta, which he seized easily. However, he died in the battle. The senate sent a messenger to order Gaius Calpurnius Piso, his successor, to hasten his departure. However, he had already left two days earlier. The other praetor, Lucius Manlius Acidinus fought an indecisive battle against the Celtiberians. Both sides withdrew and the Celtiberians moved their camp the next night, giving the Romans the chance to bury their dead and collect the spoil.

A few days later, the Celtiberians returned with a larger army and engaged the Romans near the town of Calagurris (Today's Calahorra in La Rioja, northern Hispania). They were defeated, suffering 12,000 casualties and 2,000 were captured. Livy noted that his sources did not explain why the Celtiberians who had an enlarged army were the weaker side. He also wrote that had not the arrival of Acidinus' successor prevented him from taking advantage of his success, the Celtiberians might have been subdued.

In 186 BC, the praetors Gaius Calpurnius Piso (Hispania Ulterior) and Lucius Quinctius Crispinus (Hispania Citerior) were given reinforcements consisting of 20,000 Latin and 3,000 Roman infantry and 800 Latin and 200 Roman cavalry. They conducted a common campaign. They joined their forces in Baeturia and marched into Carpetania, where the enemy camp was. Between the towns of Dipo and Toletum, a fight broke out between foraging parties and developed into a full battle. Being familiar with the ground and knowing the enemy tactics, the enemy routed the Romans, who lost 5,000 men. However, they did not keep up the pressure. The praetors left their camp the following night. At dawn the enemy approached the rampant and were surprised that it was empty. They remained in their camp for the next few days. Then they moved to the River Tagus. Meanwhile, the praetors, who had gathered auxiliaries from the allied Hispanic towns, encamped twelve miles from this river. Then they marched to the river banks at night. At dawn they saw an enemy fort on a hilltop on the other side of the river. They found two fords, split the army into two and crossed the river. The enemy watched them. They marvelled at their sudden appearance and discussed how to throw them in confusion while they were crossing. Meanwhile, the Romans brought over all their baggage, gathered in one place and, as they had no time to set up camp, lined up for battle. They had two legions. The fight was most intense in the centre and when the enemy saw that it could not be broken it formed a wedge formation. Gaius Calpurnius made a short detour with the cavalry and attacked the flank of the wedge. The allied cavalry attacked the other flank. The praetor rode so deep into the enemy ranks that it was difficult to distinguish which side he belonged to. His courage fired up both the cavalry and the infantry. The enemy was broken. The cavalry pursued the fugitives and a battle with the guard of the enemy camp started. The Cavalry had to dismount and fight on foot. The reserve infantry was called in to help. Only a few thousand out of a force of 35,000 escaped. The Romans lost 600 of their men and 150 auxiliaries.

In 184 BC, the praetor Aulus Ternentius Varro and Publius Sempronius Longo were assigned Hispania Citerior and Ulterior respectively. Hispania Ulterior was quiet during the tenure of Longus due to the successful campaign of the previous year. However, during his second year he was incapacitated by illness and died. In Hispania Citerior Varro seized the Suessetani town of Corbio (near Sanguesa, Navarre), north of the River Ebro, and sold the prisoners. The province remained quiet in the winter. In 183 BC, the two provinces in Hispania were reserved for the current praetors. In that year Aulus Terentius took on successful actions against the Celtiberians near the Ebro, in Ausetanian territory (in the north-eastern corner of Hispania). He took by storm several places the Celtiberians had fortified. Hispania Ulterior was quiet due to the long illness of Publius Sempronius.

In 182 BC, the praetors Publius Manlius (who had been Cato's second-in-command in 195 BC) and Quintus Fulvius Flaccus were assigned Hispania Ulterior and Citerior respectively. In Rome it was known that in Hispania Citerior there was war with the Celtiberians and that the army in Hispania Ulterior has lost military discipline due to the idleness caused by the long illness of Publius Sempronius. The reinforcements for the two provinces were 4,000 Roman and 7,000 allied infantry and 200 Roman and 300 allied cavalry. Aulus Terentius sent news that Publius Sempronius had died after more than a year's illness. The new praetors were ordered to leave as soon as possible. The Celtiberians attacked Fulvius Flaccus while he was besieging the town of Urbicua (probably in the modern province of Cuenca or the province of Guadalajara). The Romans suffered casualties in a number of hard battles. The praetor persevered. The Celtiberians, exhausted by many battles, withdrew and the town fell a few days later. He then went to winter camp. Publius Manlius did the same having done, according to Livy, nothing worth mentioning.

== First Celtiberian War (181–179 BC) ==
In 181 BC, The command of the praetors of the previous year, Publius Manlius (who had been Cato's second-in-command in 195 BC) and Quintus Fulvius Flaccus was extended. They had been assigned Hispania Ulterior and Citerior respectively. They received reinforcements of 3,000 Roman and 6,000 allied infantry and 200 Roman and 300 allied cavalry. A serious war broke out in Hispania Citerior. The Celtiberians gathered 35,000 men. Livy wrote: 'hardly ever before had they raised so large a force'. Quintus Fulvius Flaccus drew as many auxiliary troops from the friendly tribes as he could, but his numbers were inferior. He went to Carpetania (in central Hispania) seized the town of Aebura (Talavera de la Reina, in western part of the province of Toledo; it was at the edge of the territory of the Vettones). Quintus Fulvius then marched through Carpetania and went to Contrebia (Contrebia Belaisca near Botorrita, in the province of Zaragoza). The townsfolk sent for Celtiberian assistance by they were delayed by floods. The praetor seized the city and heavy rains forced him to take his army into the town. After the floods the Celtiberians arrived, saw no Roman camp and were caught by surprise then the Roman army came out of the town. They lost 12,000 men and 5,000 men and 400 horses were captured. Quintus Fulvius then marched through Celtiberian territory, ravaged the countryside and stormed many forts until the Celtiberians surrendered. In Hispania Ulterior the praetor Publius Manlius fought several successful actions against the Lusitanians.

In 180 BC, the praetors Tiberius Sempronius Gracchus and Lucius Postumius Albinus were assigned Hispania Citerior and Ulterior respectively. Messengers brought news of the Celtiberian surrender and requested that Quintus Fulvius Flaccus be allowed to bring back the army. Livy wrote that this was a must because the soldiers were determined to go back home and it seemed impossible to keep them in Hispania any longer. Mutiny was a possibility. Tiberius Gracchus objected to this because he did not want to lose the veterans and have an army of raw and undisciplined recruits. A compromise was reached. Gracchus was ordered to levy two legions (5,200 infantry each, but only a total of 400 cavalry instead of the usual 600) and an additional 1,000 infantry, 50 cavalry plus 7,000 Latin infantry and 300 cavalry (a total of 18,400 infantry and 750 cavalry).

Flaccus was allowed to bring back home veterans who had been sent to Hispania before 186 BC, while those who arrived after that date were to remain. He could bring back in excess of 14,000 infantry and 600 cavalry. Since his successor was late, Flaccus started a third campaign against the Celtiberians who had not surrendered, ravaging the more distant part of Celtiberia. This caused them to secretly gathered an army. They planned to strike at the Manlian Pass, which the Romans would have needed to pass through. However, he was ordered to bring his army to Tarraco (Tarragona), where Tiberius Gracchus was to disband the old army and incorporate the new troops. Gracchus was due to arrive soon. Flaccus had to abandon his campaign and withdraw from Celtiberia. The Celtiberians thought he was fleeing because he found out about their rebellion and continued to prepare their trap at the Manlian Pass. When the Romans entered the pass they were attacked on both sides. Quintus Fulvius won a hard-fought battle. The Celtiberians lost 17,000 men; 4,000 men and 600 horses were captured; 472 Romans, 1,019 Latin allies and 3,000 native auxiliaries died. Flaccus went to Tarraco the next day. Tiberius Sempronius Gracchus had landed two days earlier. The two commanders selected the soldiers who were to be discharged and those who were to remain. Flaccus returned to Rome with his veterans and Gracchus went to Celtiberia.

In 179 BC, Tiberius. Sempronius Gracchus and Lucius Postumius Albinus had their commands extended. They were reinforced with 3,000 Roman and 5,000 Latin infantry and 300 Romans and 400 Latin cavalry. They planned a joint operation. Lucius Postumius Albinus, whose province had been quiet, was to march against the Vaccaei via Lusitania and turn to Celtiberia if there was a greater war there. Tiberius Gracchus was to head into the furthest part of Celtiberia. He first took the city of Munda in an unexpected night attack. He took hostages, left a garrison, and burned the countryside until he reached a powerful town the Celtiberian called Certima. When the Celtiberians decided not to come to its aid, the town surrendered. An indemnity was imposed on them and they had to give 40 young nobles to serve in the Roman army as a pledge of loyalty.

Tiberius Gracchus moved on to Alce, where the Celtiberian camp was. He won the battle and the enemy lost 9,000 men and 320 men and 112 horses where captured; 109 Romans fell. Gracchus then marched further into Celtiberia, which he plundered. The tribes submitted. In a few days 103 towns surrendered. He then returned to Alce and begun to besiege the city. The city surrendered and many nobles were taken, including the two sons and the daughter of Thurru, a Celtiberian chief and, according to Livy, by far the most powerful man in Hispania. Thurru asked for safe conduct to visit Tiberius Gracchus. He asked him whether he and his family would be allowed to live. When Gracchus replied affirmatively he asked if he was allowed to serve with the Romans. He granted this, too. From then on Thurru followed and helped the Romans in many places.

Tiberius Gracchus founded the colony (settlement) of Gracchurris (Alfaro, in La Rioja, northern Hispania) in the Upper Ebro Valley. This marked the beginning of Roman influence in northern Hispania. It was thought that this was the only colony he founded. However, in the 1950s an inscription was found near Mangibar, on the banks of the River Baetis (Guadalquivir), which attests that he founded another one. It was Iliturgi, a mining town and a frontier outpost. Therefore, Gracchus established a colony outside his province. He concluded treaties with the surrounding tribes. Appian wrote that his 'treaties were longed for in subsequent wars'. Unlike previous praetors he spent time to negotiate and cultivate personal relations with tribal leaders. This was reminiscent of the friendly relations established by Scipio Africanus during the Second Punic War. Gracchus imposed the vicensima, the requisition 5% of the grain harvest, a form of tax that was more efficient and less vulnerable to abuse than the usual Roman practice of tendering tax collection to private 'tax farmers.' Silva notes this is the first reference to a regulatory collection of revenue. His treaties stipulated that the allies were to provide the Romans with auxiliary troops. They also established that the natives could fortify existing cities, but not found new ones. There is some evidence that he introduced civilian administrative measures, such the issuing of rights for mining to mint coins and the construction of roads. Tiberius Gracchus was remembered for his treaties and his administrative arrangements, which helped maintain peace in Hispania for the next quarter of a century.

== Period of relative peace ==
For the 24 years from the end of the First Celtiberian War in 179 BC to the beginning of the Second Celtiberian War in 155 BC, we rely on the work of Livy only up to 167 BC, up to the end of Book 45. Livy's subsequent books are lost and we have a gap of twelve years hardly any information. The epitome, which provides a brief summary of all of Livy's books (the Periochae) does not mention any conflicts in Hispania in these 12 years. It appears that this was a 24-year period of relative peace in which battles took place in Hispania in only three years.

The beginning of Livy's book 41 has been lost, and we do not know if there was any account of events in Hispania for 178 BC. For 177 BC, he only mentioned that one legion plus 5,000 infantry and 250 cavalry from the allies were given to Marcus Titinius, (who was recorded as having elected as praetor in 178 BC without specifying to which province he was assigned at the end of book 39). Livy then wrote that he was in Hispania without specifying which province. In 176 BC, Marcus Cornelius Scipio Maluginensis and Publius Licinius Crassus were assigned Hispania Ulterior and Citerior respectively. Both men found excuses not to go. We are not told why these two praetors were unwilling to take their office; normally they were taken up eagerly. It is at this point that we find out who the other praetor was. Livy wrote that the praetorships of Marcus Titinius and Titus Fonteius in Hispania were extended. Again, Livy did not specify which of the two provinces each held. They were given reinforcements of 3,000 Roman and 5,000 Latin infantry and 200 Roman and 300 Latin cavalry.

In 174 BC, Cnaeus Servilius Caepio and Publius Furius Philus were assigned Hispania Ulterior and Citerior respectively and were given 3,000 Roman and 5,000 Latin infantry and 150 Roman and 300 Latin cavalry. In a passage that comes after the recording of the praetors for 174 BC, Livy wrote about a praetor called Appius Claudius and noted that on his arrival in Hispania the Celtiberians, who had surrendered to Tiberius Gracchus were quiet during the praetorship of Marcus Titinius, rebelled. Presumably he was a praetor for 175 BC and the record of his election was in the part of chapter 18 of book 40, which is lost. He was probably the praetor of Hispania Citerior. The Celtiberians attacked the Roman camp by surprise at dawn. They engaged the Romans as they were coming out of the gates of the camp. After an initial struggle the Romans forced their way out and formed a line against the flanks of the Celtiberians, who surrounded them. They burst out so suddenly that the enemy could not withstand their charge and was repulsed. Their camp was captured; 15,000 were killed or captured. This ended the conflict. The Celtiberians submitted. We do not have any information on the other praetor in Hispania. He might have been referred to the mentioned missing text. Richardson holds that a man with the cognomen Cento (usually written as Centho in the literary sources) is recorded in the Fasti Triumphales and that he may have been the praetor of Hispania Ulterior who succeed Titus Fontueus. Therefore, he must have won a battle, but there is no record of his activities.

In 173 BC, the praetors Numerius Fabius Buteo and Marcus Matienus were assigned Hispania Citerior and Ulterior respectively. They were reinforced by 3,000 Roman infantry and 200 cavalry. Numerius Fabius Buteo died in Massalia (Marseilles) while on his way. His replacement was chosen by lot between the two departing praetors and the assignment fell on Publius Furius Philus. In 172 BC, Marcus Junius and Spurius Lucretius were assigned Hispania Citerior and Ulterior respectively. The Senate refused to give them reinforcements. They then made their request again and received 3,000 Roman and 5,000 allied infantry and 50 Roman and 300 allied cavalry. During the Third Macedonian War (171–168 BC) only one praetor was allocated to Hispania. In 171 BC, it was allocated to Lucius Canuleius Dives.

=== Trials for extortion ===
In 171 BC, envoys of several allied peoples from both the provinces in Hispania went to Rome. They complained about the rapacity and arrogance of Roman officials. They asked the senate not to allow them 'to be more wretchedly despoiled and harassed than its enemies'. There were many acts of injustice and of extortion. Lucius Canuleius Dives was tasked with assigning five judges of senatorial rank for each man the Hispanics were seeking to recover money from and to allow the latter to choose advocates. They were told to nominate them. They chose Marcus Porcius Cato (who had conducted the Roman campaign of 195 BC), Publius Cornelius Scipio (who had been praetor in Hispania Ulterior in 193 BC), Lucius Aemilius Paulus (who had been praetor in Hispania Ulterior from 191 to 189 BC) and Gaius Sulpicius Gallus. The case of Marcus Titinius (praetor in Hispania Citerior in 175 BC) was taken up first and was heard by a board of judges. This trial was adjourned twice and on the third session he was acquitted. There was a dispute between the envoys of the two provinces. As a result, the peoples of Hispania Citerior chose Marcus Porcius Cato and Publius Cornelius Scipio as advocates and the peoples of Hispania Ulterior chose Lucius Aemilius Paulus and Gaius Sulpicius Gallus. The case of the people of Citerior was against Publius Furius Philus (praetor 174 and 173 BC) and that of the people of Ulterior was against Marcus Matienus (praetor in 173 BC). Livy made a mistake and wrote that they were praetors for three and two years respectively. Both were accused of most serious offences and both cases were adjourned. Cato made a speech (Pro Hispanis de frumento) in which he attacked Publius Furius Philus for unjust valuation of grain received as tribute. At the new trial it was reported that both men had gone into exile outside Roman territory, the former to Praeneste, the latter to Tibur (two Latin towns, today's Palestrina and Tivoli). There were suspicions that their representatives would not allow charges against 'men of rank and influence'. These were heightened when Lucius Canuleius Dives abandoned the investigation and left for his province suddenly. The senate granted the request of the Hispanics that no Roman official was to be allowed to set the price of grain or force the locals to sell there 5% quota at the price he wished and that no officers could be placed over the towns to collect money.

This was the earliest known trial of an official thus accused by provincials. Previous complaints of like nature had been adjudicated by the senate or the consuls. The senate appointed the recuperatores (recuperators) to investigate extortion and maladministration by the praetors and to recover damages for provincial plaintiffs. The trials were a precursor of the standing court of recovery of property (quaestio de pecuniis repetundis) established by a Calpurnian Law of 149 BC, whose judges were transferred from the patrician aristocracy to the equestrians by Gaius Gracchus in 122 BC.

Another deputation from Hispania represented 4,000 men who said that they were sons of Roman soldiers and local women who could not legally marry. They asked that a town be given to them to live in. The senate asked them to give their names and the names of anyone they had manumitted to Lucius Canuleius. It decreed they should be settled at Cartei, on the coast, and the Carteians who wished to remain were to be allowed to join the colonists and receive a plot land. The town became the "Colony of the Libertini" with Latin rights.

In 169 BC, Hispania was given reinforcements of 3,000 Roman and infantry and 300 cavalry and the number of soldiers in each legion was fixed at 5,200 infantry and 300 cavalry. The praetor Marcus Claudius Marcellus, who was assigned Hispania, was to demand from the local allies 4,000 infantry and 300 cavalry. He seized the noted city of Marcolica (Marjaliza). In 168 BC, Hispania was assigned to Publius Fonteius. In 167 BC, after the Third Macedonian War (171–168 BC) it was decided to reconstitute two provinces in Hispania. The praetors Cneius Fulvius and Licinius Nerva were assigned Hispania Citerior and Ulterior respectively. In 166 BC, Licinius Nerva, Publius Rutilius Calvus were assigned 'the two Spanish provinces'; Livy did not specify which one each was assigned to

Livy's book 45 ends with the year 167 BC. At this point, the rest of the books of Livy are lost. The mentioned epitome (the Periochae), which gave a very brief summary of all of Livy's books, records that there several unsuccessful campaigns in Hispania by various commanders in 154 BC and that in that year there was the beginning of the consuls being elected slightly earlier and starting their office on 1 January instead of 15 March as customary. This was caused by a rebellion in Hispania. This is a reference to the Second Celtiberian War.

== Second Celtiberian War ==
Appian wrote that this war broke out because Segeda (near Zaragoza), a powerful city of the Celtiberian tribe of the Belli, persuaded the people of some smaller towns to settle there and was building a circuit of walls seven kilometres long. It also forced the neighbouring Titti to join in. The Belli had agreed to the treaties Tiberius Sempronius Gracchus had made with tribes in Hispania at the end of the First Celtiberian War. Rome considered that Segeda was breaking the treaty. It forbade the building of the wall and demanded the tribute and the provision of a contingent for the Roman army in accordance with the stipulations of Gracchus' treaty. The Segedans replied that the treaty forbade the construction of new towns, but did not forbid the fortification existing ones. They also said that they had been subsequently released from the tribute and the military contingent by the Romans. This was true, but the senate argued that when it granted such exemptions it always specified that they were to continue only during its pleasure. The senate must have decided to withdraw the exemptions because it was worried about the development of Segeda into a powerful city in the land of the Celtiberians, who had a history of rebellions. Rome prepared for war.

In 153 BC, the praetor Quintus Fabius Nobilitor arrived in Hispania with a force of nearly 30,000 men. The people of Segeda, whose wall had not been completed, fled and sought refuge among the Arevaci (another Celtiberian tribe), who welcomed them. An ambush in a thick forest with 20,000 infantry and 500 cavalry was prepared. The Romans lost 6,000 men. From then on they would not engage in battle on the day of the festival of the god Vulcan because this defeat occurred on that day. The Arevaci assembled at the town of Numantia (seven kilometres north of today's Soria, on a hill known as Cerro de la Muela near Garray), which had strong natural defences. Three days later Nobilitor encamped four kilometres from the town. He was joined by 300 cavalry and ten elephants sent by Masinissa, the king of Numidia, a Roman ally in Africa. The sight of the elephants frightened the enemy, who had never seen these animals. They fled inside the town. However, during the ensuing fierce battle an elephant was hit by a large falling stone and made a loud noise, which frightened the other elephants. They went on the rampage, trampling over the Romans, who took to disorderly flight. The Numantines made a sortie and killed 4,000 Romans and three elephants. Nobilitor then attacked the town of Axinium, which stored the enemy supplies, but did not achieve anything. He lost many men and returned to his camp at night. These Roman disasters encouraged the town of Ocilis (Medinaceli, also in the modern province of Soria) to defect to the Celtiberians. The Roman provisions were kept in this town. Nobilitor withdrew to his winter camp and suffered food shortages. Because of this, heavy snowstorms and frost many of his men died.

In 152 BC, Marcus Claudius Marcellus, consul for the third time, took over the command, bringing 8,000 infantry and 500 cavalry to Hispania. He avoided an ambush and he encamped in front of Ocilis. He seized the town and granted it pardon. This encouraged Nertobriga (a town of the Belli, in the modern province of Zaragoza) to ask for peace. Marcellus asked for 100 cavalry and they agreed. However, a raid on the rear guard of the Romans led to Marcellus besieging the town, which sent a herald to ask for peace again. Marcellus said that he would not grant peace unless the Arevaci, Belli, and Titti asked for it together. The Nertobriges sent ambassadors to these tribes and asked Marcellus for leniency and for the renewal of the treaty made with Tiberius Gracchus. This was opposed by some rural people who had been incited to war. Marcellus sent envoys from each party to Rome to carry on their dispute there and sent private letters to the senate letters urging peace. For details about these deputations in Rome see the main article. Marcellus wanted to bring the war to an end himself and gain glory this way.

The Senate rejected the peace and sent a new consul, Lucius Licinius Lucullus, to continue the war. Marcellus told the Celtiberians about the impending war and gave them back their hostages on their request. He held a conference with the Celtiberians. After this 5,000 Arevaci took Nergobriga. Marcellus went to Numantia and drove the Numantines inside the city walls. They asked for peace talks. The Belli, Titti and Arevaci put themselves in his hands. Marcellus asked for hostages and money. He succeeded in bringing the war to an end before the arrival of Lucullus. Appian wrote that Lucullus was greedy for fame and money. He attacked the Vaccaei (a tribe who lived to the east of the Arevaci) because he was 'in straitened circumstances'. This was despite the fact that the senate had not declared war on them and this tribe had never attacked the Romans. He pretended that they were supplying the Celtiberians as an excuse for war. He crossed the River Tagus and encamped near the town of Cauca (Coca in the province of Segovia). The consul said that they had mistreated the Carpetani and that he had come to their aid as an excuse for his presence there. The Caucaei lost a battle and sued for peace. Lucullus demanded hostages, 100 talents of silver and a contingent of cavalry for his army. When these were provided he also demanded that the town be garrisoned by the Romans. This was agreed and Lucullus ordered 2,000 picked soldiers to seize the city. Then the rest of the Roman army, which had been ordered to kill all adult males, was let in. Only a few out of 20,000 managed to escape. Some of them went to other towns. They burnt what they could not take with them to deprive Lucullus of booty.

Lucullus marched on the town of Itercatia, where more than 20,000 infantry and 2,000 cavalry had taken refuge. He called for peace talks. The inhabitants reproached him for the slaughter of the Caucaei and asked him if he intended to do the same to them. Appian wrote: "he, like all guilty souls, being angry with his accusers instead of reproaching himself, laid waste their fields". He then begun a siege and repeatedly lined up his men for battle to provoke a fight. The enemy did not respond. The soldiers were sick due to lack of sleep and dysentery caused by the local food they were not used to. Many died of the latter. When some of the siege works were completed the Romans knocked down a section of the city walls, but they were quickly overpowered. They fled and not knowing the area many fell into a reservoir and died. The enemy repaired the wall. As both sides suffered famine, Scipio Aemilianus, an officer, proposed peace and promised that it would not be violated. The Itercalati trusted him and gave Lucullus 10,000 cloaks, some cattle and 50 hostages as part of the terms.

Next Lucullus went to Pallantia (Pelencia). This town was hosting a large number of refugees and was renowned for its bravery. He was advised to avoid it, but he heard that it was a rich town. He encamped there and did not leave until constant harassment of the Roman foragers by the Pallantian cavalry prevented him from getting supplies. The Romans withdrew and were pursued by the enemy until they reached the River Durius (Douro). Lucullus went to the territory of the Turdetani (in Hispania Ulterior) and went into winter camps. This was the end of his illegal war against the Vaccaei. He was never called to account for it. Appian commented: "As for the gold and silver that Lucullus was after (and for the sake of which he had waged this war, thinking that all of Hispania abounded with gold and silver), he got nothing. Not only did they have none, but these particular [tribes] did not set any value on those metals.

In his account of the Lusitanian War, Appian wrote that Lucullus and Servius Sulpicius Galba, a praetor who was in charge of the troops in Hispania Ulterior and was campaigning against a Lusitanian rebellion, conducted a joint pincer operation against Lusitania. According to Appian they gradually depopulated it. Appian described Galba as being even more greedy than Lucullus. He killed many Lusitanians by treachery.

== Lusitanian War and Viriathic War ==
Lusitania was probably the area of the peninsula that resisted the Roman invasion for the longest time. Until the year 155 BC, the Lusitanian chief Punicus made raids into the part of Lusitania controlled by Rome, ending with the twenty-year peace made by the former praetor Sempronius Gracchus. Punicus obtained an important victory against the praetors Manilius and Calpurnius, inflicting 6,000 casualties.

After the death of Punicus, Caesarus took charge of the fight against Rome, vanquishing the Roman troops again in 153 BC, revealing his banner in the battle, which triumphantly showed to the rest of the Iberian peoples how to display the vulnerability of Rome. At the time, the Vetones and Celtiberians had united in resistance, leaving the situation for Rome in this area of Hispania somewhat precarious. Lusitanians, Vetones and Celtiberians raided the Mediterranean coasts, while, to secure their position on the Peninsula, they deployed to North Africa. It was in this year that two new consuls arrived in Hispania, Quintus Fulvius Nobilior and Lucius Mummius. The urgency of restoring dominion over Hispania made the two consuls enter into battle within two and a half months. The Lusitanians sent to Africa were defeated at Okile (modern Arcila in Morocco) by Mummius, who forced them to accept a peace treaty. For his part, the consul Servius Sulpicius Galba made a peace treaty with three of the Lusitanian tribes, and then, pretending to be a friend, killed the youth and sold the rest of the people to Gaul.

Nobilior was replaced in the following year (152 BC) by Marcus Claudius Marcellus (consul 166 BC). He in turn was succeeded in 150 BC by Lucius Licinius Lucullus, who was distinguished by his cruelty and infamy.

In 147 BC, a new Lusitanian leader named Viriathus rebelled against the Roman forces. He had fled from Serbius Sulpicius Galba three years earlier, and, reuniting the Lusitanian tribes again, Viriathus began a guerrilla war that fiercely struck the enemy without giving open battle. He commanded many campaigns and arrived with his troops at the Murcian coasts. His numerous victories and the humiliation he inflicted upon the Romans made him worthy of the permanent place he holds in Portuguese and Spanish memory as a revered hero who fought without respite. Viriathus was assassinated about 139 BC by Audax, Ditalcus and Minurus, probably paid off by the Roman General Marcus Popillius Laenas. With his death, the organized Lusitanian resistance did not disappear but Rome continued to expand into the region.

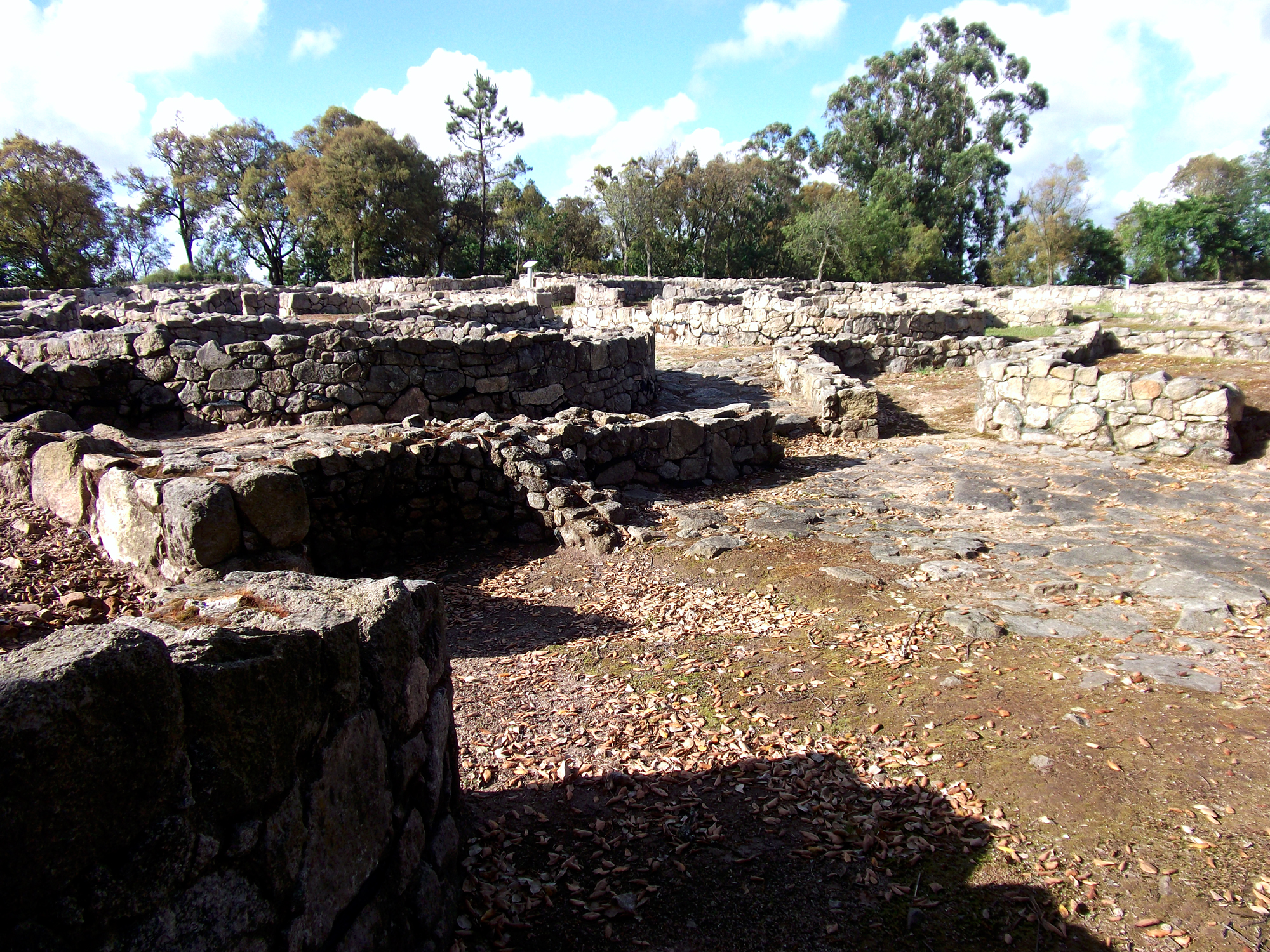
The destruction led by Decimus Junius Brutus is an archaeological evidence in Cividade de Terroso. Roman reconstruction, quadrangular buildings instead of native circular ones, is also visible.

Between 135 and 132 BC, Consul Decimus Junius Brutus brought about an expedition to Gallaecia (north of Portugal and Galicia). Almost simultaneously (133 BC) the Celtiberian city Numantia, the last bastion of the Celtiberians, was destroyed. This was the culminating point of the war between the Celtiberians and the Romans between 143 BC and 133 BC; the Celtiberian city had been taken by Publius Cornelius Scipio Æmilianus, when the opportunity was too much to resist. The Celtiberian chiefs committed suicide with their families and the rest of the population was sold into slavery. The city was razed.

== The Numantine War ==
In 143 BC, the consul Quintus Caecilius Metellus Macedonicus subdued the Arevaci by attacking them suddenly while they were harvesting. He did not take Termantia and Numantia. In 142 BC, the praetor Quintus Pompeius Aulus took over with a well-trained army of 30,000 infantry and 2,000 cavalry. While he went away, the Numantines made a sortie against a cavalry detachment and destroyed it. On his return, the Numantines offered battle, but they withdrew slowly until he was drawn to the ditches and palisades. When his forces were repeatedly defeated in skirmishes Quintus Pompeius moved on to attack Termantia, but lost 700 men. In a third battle, the Romans were driven to a rocky place where many of them were forced down a precipice. An indecisive battle followed. Pompeius then went to the town of Malia, which was surrendered by treachery. He fought some brigands at Sedatania and defeated them.

Pompeius went back to Numantia and tried to divert a river to reduce the town by famine. The men who were doing this work were constantly harassed and those who came to their rescue were attacked and forced into the Roman camp. The foragers were also attacked. A Roman envoy arrived with an army or raw and undisciplined recruits who were to replace the soldiers who had served their six years. Pompeius stayed in winter camps with these recruits, who were exposed to the cold without shelter and caught dysentery because they were not used to the local water. Many died. A foraging party was ambushed. Pompeius sent his soldiers to the towns to spend the rest of the winter and waited for his successor. Fearing that he would be held to account for his failures he approached the Numantines. The concluded a peace agreement. Pompeius demanded hostages, the prisoners, the deserters, and 30 talents of silver, part of which was to be paid in instalments.

In 139 BC, when the new consul, Marcus Popillius Laenas, arrived to take over, the last instalment was being paid. Pompeius, knowing that he had made a peace the Romans considered disgraceful and without the consent of the senate, denied that he had made a deal. The Numantines proved the contrary through the testimony of the senatorial envoys and his officers. Pompeius and Numantine envoys were sent to Rome to continue the dispute there. The senate decided to continue the war. Popillius Laenas attacked the Lusones, a Celtiberian tribe close to Numantia, but did not accomplish anything and returned to Rome. In 137 BC, the consul Gaius Hostilius Mancinus lost frequent clashes with the Numantines. On false rumours that the Cantabri of northern Hispania and the Vaccaei of west-central Hispania were coming to the aid of the Numantines he panicked, left the camp and went to an empty place where a commander in the Second Celtiberian War had a camp. At dawn he was surrounded and he was without fortifications. The Numantines threatened to kill everyone if he did not make peace. He agreed terms like those made by Quintus Pompeius Aulus. This caused outrage in Rome. Another consul, Marcus Aemilius Lepidus Porcina, was sent to Hispania and Mancinus was recalled to stand trial. Plutarch said that he was "not bad as a man, but most unfortunate of the Romans as a general."

Aemilius Lepidus, who wanted glory, did not wait for instructions from Rome and attacked the Vaccaei, who lived in west-central Hispania to the west of the Celtiberians, falsely accusing them of supplying the Numantines. He ravaged the countryside and started a siege of their main town, Pallantia. He persuaded Decimus Junius Brutus Callaicus, his brother-in-law who had carried out counterinsurgency operations in Lusitania and Gallaecia, to join him. Messengers from Rome arrived. They said that the senate was at a loss to know what he should seek a new war and warned him not to proceed. Aemilius carried on regardless. The siege of Pallantia dragged on and the Roman supplies failed. All pack animals and many men died. The Romans withdrew in a disorderly way at night. At dawn the enemy attacked them at the rear and flank all day. Aemilius Lepidus was stripped of this consulship and when he returned to Rome he was fined. In 135 BC, the consul Quintus Calpurnius Piso was assigned Hispania. He made an incursion in the territory of Pallantia, collected a small amount of plunder and spent the rest of his term of office in winter camp in Carpetania (in central Hispania).

In 134 BC, the Romans, who were tired of this war, elected Scipio Aemilianus (who had defeated Carthage) as consul because they thought that he was the only man who could win the war. The army in Hispania was demoralised and ill-disciplined. Scipio concentrated on restoring discipline by forbidding luxuries the troops had become accustomed to, through regular tough exercises (all-day marches, building camps and fortifications and then demolishing them, digging ditches and then filling them up, and the like) and by enforcing regulations strictly. When he thought that the army was ready he encamped near Numantia. He did not proceed along the shorter route to avoid the guerrilla tactics the Numantines were good at. Instead, he made a detour through the land of the Vaccaei, who now were selling food to the Numantines. He was ambushed several times, but defeated the enemy. In one of these ambushes, by a river that was difficult to cross, he was forced to make a detour along a longer route where there was no water. He marched at night when it was cooler and dug wells into bitter water. He saved his men, but some horses and pack animals died of thirst. Then he passed through the territory of the Caucaei who had broken the treaty with Rome and declared that they could return safely to their homes. He returned to the Numanitine territory and was joined by Jugurtha, the grandson of the king of Numidia (a Roman ally in Africa), with twelve elephants, archers and slingers.

Eventually, Scipio prepared to besiege Numantia. He asked the allied tribes in Hispania for specified numbers of troops. He built a nine-kilometre circuit of fortifications with seven towers. The wall was three metres high and two and a half metres wide. He built an embankment of the same dimensions as the wall around the adjoining marsh, and two towers by the River Durius (Douro) to which he moored large timbers with ropes full of knives and spear heads, constantly kept in motion by the current. This prevented the enemy from slipping through covertly. He managed to force Numantia into starvation. The Numantines surrendered. Some killed themselves. Scipio kept 50 men for his triumph, sold the rest into slavery and destroyed the city.

Appian wrote: "With only 8,000 men when the war began, how many and what terrible reverses they bring upon the Romans! How many treaties did they make on equal terms with the Romans, which the latter would not consent to make with any other people! How often did they challenge to open battle the last commander sent against them, who had an army of 60,000 men!" He noted "their small numbers and great sufferings, their valiant deeds and long endurance."

== Aftermath of the defeat of the Lusitanians and the Celtiberians ==
The defeats of the Celtiberians and the Lusitanians were a major step in the pacification of Hispania. It did not end the rebellions, but these were sporadic and, apart from a period after the Cimbrian War (113–101 BC), they were on a reduced scale.

Plutarch noted that Gaius Marius conducted operations in Hispania Ulterior in 114 BC: "the province of [Hispania Ulterior] was allotted to him, and here he is said to have cleared away the robbers, although the province was still uncivilized in its customs and in a savage state, and robbery was at that time still considered a most honourable occupation."

Appian wrote that Calpurnius Piso was sent as a commander to Hispania because there were revolts. The following year, Servius Galba was sent without soldiers because the Romans were busy with Cimbrian War and a slave rebellion in Sicily (the [Third Servile War], 104–100 BC). In the former war the Germanic tribes of the Cimbri and the Teutones migrated around Europe and invaded territories of allies of Rome, particularly in southern France, and routed the Romans in several battles until their final defeat. In 105 BC, some of them also made a foray in northern Hispania and then returned to Gaul. Appian wrote that the Romans sent governors who would settle affairs in Hispania without war as much as they could. This decrease in the military presence and possibly the mentioned foray into northern Hispania might have encouraged significant rebellions.

In 98 BC, after the defeat of the Cimbri, the consul Titus Didius was sent to Hispania. He killed about 20,000 Arevaci. He also moved Tarmesum, "a large city always insubordinate to the Romans", from hills that were easily defended to the plain, and forbade the construction of city walls. He besieged the city of Colenda for nine months, seized it, and sold the inhabitants, including women and children.

A city near Colenda lived by robbery because of its poverty. It was inhabited by mixed Celtiberian tribes who had been allies of Marcus Marius in a war against the Lusitianians and he settled them there five years earlier with the approval of the senate. Titus Didius wanted to destroy them and got the approval of senatorial commissioners. He told the city that he would allot the land of Colenda to them and to assemble for the parcelling out of the land. He moved the Roman soldiers out of their camp and told the people to go in there because he wanted to put the men on a register and the women and children on another. When they got in, he had them killed by the army. This is similar to the kind of treachery with which Servius Sulpicius Galba butchered many Lusitanians to end their rebellion of 155–150 BC (see Lusitanian War and Viriathic War section).

In 82 BC, there was a Celtiberian rebellion. Gaius Valerius Flaccus was sent against them and killed 20,000. The people of the town of Belgida burned the leaders in the senate house when they hesitated to revolt. When Flaccus heard of this, he executed the ringleaders for this deed.

Titus Didius was the first consul sent to Hispania since the end on the Numantine War. He did not return to Rome until his triumph in 93 BC. He was probably the governor of Hispania Citerior and Publius Licinius Crassus, who celebrated a triumph over the Lusitanians in 93 BC, was probably the governor of Hispania Ulterior. Valerius Flaccus returned to Rome for his triumph in 81 BC, which was awarded for his actions in both Celtiberia and Gallia Narbonensis. It is not possible to determine whether his terms as governor in Hispania and Gaul were overlapping or sequential. No other governor is documented for Hispania in this period, and since the senate only began assigning Gallia Narbonensis as a regular province in the mid-90s, administrative arrangements were still evolving. Cicero, refrained from calling him the lawful governor there. Julius Caesar's Commentaries on the Gallic War (1.47.4) attested that he was in Gaul in 83 BC. The Tabula Contrebiensis, a bronze tablet, on which his ruling pertaining to boundaries and water-rights arbitration is inscribed, shows that he was in Hispania until at least 87 BC. The reason for these prolonged tenures of office in Hispania is unknown. Richardson speculates that they were probably connected with the situation of war in Italy, where there was the rebellion of the Italian allies against Rome (the Social War of 91–88 BC. However, the dates do not quite coincide.

According to Appian, in 61 BC, Julius Caesar, who was praetor in Hispania Citerior, brought under subjection "all those [Hispanics] who were doubtful of their allegiance, or had not yet submitted to the Romans". Suetonius specified that Caesar acted against the Lusitanians: "he not only begged money from the allies, to help pay his debts, but also attacked and sacked some towns of the Lusitanians although they did not refuse his terms and opened their gates to him on his arrival."

== Conflict between Vascones and Celtiberians ==
For more than a century, the Vascones (who are considered to be the ancestors of the Basques) and the Celtiberians fought over the rich land of the River Ebro Valley. The Celtiberian town of Calagurris (Calahorra) probably carried the brunt of the conflict, helped by tribal alliances. The Vascones probably had a fairly important settlement on the other side of the Ebro, in an area across from Calagurris, which also gained the support of Vascones from other areas. The Celtiberians destroyed the city of the Vascones and occupied lands on the other side of the Ebro. The Celtiberians were enemies of Rome, whereas the Vascones were Rome's allies. When Calagurris was destroyed by the Romans it was repopulated with Vascones. It was probably the first Vascon city on the other side of this river, in the historical region of Old Castille.

== The Roman civil wars ==
=== The Sertorian War ===
This civil war was fought in Hispania between Quintus Sertorius in coalition with native tribes and the regime of Sulla from 80 BC to 72 BC. It followed the two civil wars between Lucius Cornelius Sulla and Gaius Marius in Italy. Sertorius had fought against Sulla in the first civil war. In 82 BC, he withdrew to Hispania as a governor representing his political faction, the populares. The Roman officials in Hispania did not recognise his authority, but he took control with his army. Sertorius sent an army, under Livius Salinator, to fortify the pass through the Pyrenees against Sulla's forces. However, Salinator was killed by treachery and these forces, under the command of Gaius Annius, broke through. Sertorius fled to Africa where he undertook a campaign in Mauretania in which he defeated one of Sulla's commanders and captured Tingis (Tangier).

Disaffected Lusitanians sent envoys to Sertorius and chose him as their leader because of his benign policy when he was governor. The Lusitanians probably wanted someone who was sympathetic to them. In 80 BC, Sertorius defeated a naval force under Aurelius Cotta and landed in Hispania. He went to Lusitania, organised their tribes, returned Hispania Ulterior and won the Battle of the Baetis River. Rome sent Quintus Caecilius Metellus Pius, whom they appointed as governor of Hispania Ulterior, to counter this threat. He encamped at Metellinum (Medellin) and made several incursions against the Celtiberians and the Vaccaei of central Hispania who had allied with Sertorius. Two years of guerrilla tactics by Sertorius wore him down. Lucius Hirtuleius, Setrorius' lieutenant, defeated Marcus Domitius Calvinus, the governor of Hispania Citerior. Marcus Perpenna Vento, who had fought against Sulla, fled to Hispania with an army and wanted to fight Quintus Caecilius Metellus on his own. His soldiers were dissatisfied with his command and when they heard that Pompey was coming to Hispania with enemy forces they demanded to be taken to Sertorius. Marcus Perpenna yielded reluctantly. Pompey was pushed back by Sertorius, but Caecilius Metellus defeated Lucius Hirtuleius near Italica. In 75 BC, Caecilius Metellus defeated and killed Lucius Hirtuleius. Sertorius fought Pompey in an indecisive battle. Then Sertorius was defeated by Pompey and Caecilius Metellus. In 74 BC, Caecilius Metellus and Pompey concentrated their operations against the Celtiberians and Vaccaei. During 73 BC, there were tensions between the Sertorians and their native allies. Then Marcus Perperna assassinated Sertorius. Finally, Marcus Perperna was ambushed and captured by Pompey.

=== Julius Caesar's Civil War ===
In 49 BC, Julius Caesar invaded Italy, effectively declaring war on the Roman Senate. Pompey, the leader of the forces of the Senate, fled to Greece. Caesar executed an extraordinary 27-day forced march from Rome to Hispania to confront the legions of Pompey stationed there. He defeated seven Pompeian legions led by Lucius Afranius, Marcus Petreius and Marcus Terentius Varro at the Battle of Ilerda (Lerida), in north-eastern Hispania. There were further battles: one in southern Illyria (Albania) and one in Greece in 49 BC; and three in Africa (Tunisia, one in 49 BC and two in 46 BC). The final battle was between Caesar and Gnaeus Pompeius, the son of Pompey, supported by Titus Labienus and Publius Attius Varus, in 45 BC. It was the Battle of Munda, which was fought at Campus Mundensis, probably near Lantejuela, in southern Hispania. One year later, Caesar was assassinated.

== Last stage of the conquest: the Cantabrian Wars ==
The Cantabrian Wars (29–19 BC) were fought between the Romans and the Gallaeci, Cantabrians and Astures of northern Hispania. It was a long and bloody war because it was fought in the mountains of Cantabria, Gallaecia and Asturia — mountains are difficult to conquer — and because the rebels used guerrilla tactics effectively. The war dragged on for ten years and ended with the subjugation of these two peoples. When these wars ended Augustus annexed the whole of Hispania to the Roman Empire and reorganised its provinces. These wars were also the end of resistance against the Romans in Hispania.

The causes of this war are unclear. We have hardly any information about their first years, before the involvement of Augustus, the first Roman emperor. The only extant writing on this war, apart from some passing references by other authors, is a brief account by Florus and another equally brief one by Orosius. Both authors concentrated on when Augustus was engaged in the war. Florus wrote that the Cantabri tried to dominate their neighbours and harassed them, carrying out frequent raids on the Autrigones (who lived between the Atlantic and the source of the River Ebro) to their east, the Curgoni (or Turmodigi, in the area within the Arlanzón and Arlanza river valleys in the modern province of Burgos) to their southeast, and the Vaccaei (in the northwest of central Hispania) to their south. Orosius wrote much the same. We do not know whether, or, if so, how much of a part this played in the outbreak of the war.

Augustus took the command in 26 BC, the fourth year of the war. He left Rome in 27 BC. There were rumours that he was going to conquer Britannia to perform a great military feat. Instead, he undertook the reorganisation of Gallic provinces that had been left largely unsupervised since their conquest by Julius Caesar in his Gallic Wars (58–50 BC). He might have seen the war in next door Hispania as a chance for military glory. He reached Tarraco (Tarragona) in eastern Hispania in 27 BC, but he arrived in the area too late for fighting before winter set in. In terms of personal propaganda these wars became his war, even though he fought only one campaign. In 25 BC, he retired to Tarraco due to illness. Cassius Dio wrote that he fell ill from over-exertion and anxiety. González Echegaray, places the involvement of Augustus in the political context of his task of delineating and defending the frontiers of the Roman Empire after the Roman civil wars. After the conquest of Gaul there was no more room for expansion and there was the task defence from attacks of the borders in Europe in the face of a reduction in size of the Roman army. In an economic context there was the question of control over the rich gold mine at Las Medullas (the richest in the empire) in Asturia and the abundant iron ores of Cantabria. Towards the end of the Roman Civil Wars there was a shortage of gold and silver.

In 29 BC, the Roman commander was Titus Statilius Taurus. In 28 and 27 BC it was Sextus Appuleius, who celebrated a triumph in 26 BC. Augustus started his campaign in 26 BC after having established his quarters in Segisama (today's Sasamon, in the province of Burgos), the capital of the Turmodigi who must have been Roman allies. Three divisions attacked three points. The first one fought a battle under the city walls of Vellica and the enemy fled to Mount Vindius. This opened the way north, enabling the division to join the forces who had landed on the coast and attack the enemy at the rear. Due to the ragged terrain the Romans decided to starve the enemy into surrender. The second division moved east and destroyed Aracelium. The third division moved west into Gallaecia. The enemy made a final stand at Mount Medullus in the Sierra de Mamed, close to the River Sil. It was besieged, with a ditch 15 miles long. It capitulated in the winter; many committed suicide. Augustus came from Tarraco (where he had gone due to his illness) to receive the surrender in person. In 25 BC the war was fought only against the Astures. The Romans were led by Publius Carusius. Despite the reverses of the previous year, the Astures went on the offensive. They came down the snow-covered mountains and encamped on the River Astura (or, more likely, the Orbigo, one of its tributaries) in the plain of León. They split their forces into three columns to attack the three Roman camps. However they were betrayed by one of their tribes, the Astures Brigaecini, who informed Carusius. He attacked them by surprise and pushed them to Lancia (near Villasabariego, León). He besieged the town, which resisted fiercely, and seized it. The capture of other strongholds completed the conquest of the district. In Rome the door of the Temple of Janus was closed. This symbolised peace and the war was considered over. However the Cantabri and the Astures soon resumed hostilities and the war continued for another six years. Still, Augustus was able to claim the glory of victory.

The defeat of the Cantabri and the Astures marked the end of the resistance against the Romans in Hispania. Despite the wars lasting ten years and the fierce resistance by these two peoples, it seems that there were no other rebellions in Hispania, not even by the neighbouring peoples, even though the written record is very thin. It is likely that the rest of the peninsula after the previous pacifications had become quite integrated into the Roman administrative system and economy.

Augustus annexed the whole of the peninsula to the Roman Empire. The Roman province of Hispania Citerior was significantly expanded and came to include the eastern part of central Hispania and northern Hispania. It was renamed Hispania Tarraconensis. Hispania Ulterior was divided into the provinces of Baetica (most of modern Andalusia) and Lusitania, which covered present day Portugal up to the River Durius (Douro), the present autonomous community of Extremadura and a small part of the province of Salamanca in today's Spain.

After the wars there was an increase in the Roman presence in Hispania. The Romans deployed eight legions for the wars. Many of the veterans, who had the right to be granted a plot of land to farm on discharge, were settled in Hispania. Several Roman towns were founded: Augusta Emerita (Mérida, Extremadura) in 25 BC (it became the capital of the province of Hispania Lusitania; it was probably founded by Publius Carusius); Asturica Augusta (Astorga, province of Leon) in 14 BC (it became an important administrative centre); Colonia Caesar Augusta or Caesaraugusta (Zaragoza, Aragón) in 14 BC; and Lucus Augusti (Lugo, Galicia) in 13 BC (it was the most important Roman town in Gallaecia). The Roman presence had probably increased during the first century BC as a number of Roman colonies were founded in this period: Colonia Clunia Sulpicia (in the province of Burgos, it was one of the most important Roman cities of the northern half of Hispania), Cáparra (in the north of Extremadura), Complutum (Alcalá de Henares near Madrid). Augustus also commissioned the via Augusta (which went from the Pyrenees all the way to Cádiz and was 1,500 kilometres or 900 miles long).
