= Suessetani =

Pre-Roman people of the Iberian Peninsula

The Iberian Peninsula in the 3rd century BC.

The Suessetani were a pre-Roman people of the northeast Iberian Peninsula that dwelt mainly in the plains area of the Alba (Arba) river basin (a northern tributary of the Ebro river), in today's Cinco Villas, Aragon, Zaragoza Province (westernmost Aragon region) and Bardenas Reales area (southernmost Navarra region), west of the Gallicus river (today's Gállego river), east of the low course of the Aragon river and north of the Iberus (Ebro) river, in the valley plains of this same river. Their location, in relation to other tribes, was south of the Iacetani (Aquitanian tribe), west of the Vescetani or Oscenses (Iberian tribe) north of the Lusones and Pellendones (Celtiberian tribes), also north of the Sedetani (Iberian tribe), and southeast of the Vascones (Aquitanian tribe or people).

Corbio was the capital of the Suessetani and an important fortified city, yet unlocated (maybe between Sangüesa and Sos del Rey Católico).

== Ethnic and linguistic affiliation ==
There is yet no definitive conclusion about their ethnic affiliation. They could have been an Iberian or an Aquitanian tribe, but because of their ethnic name, and place and river names (toponyms and hydronyms), the indo-European, pre-Celtic indo-European and Celtic affiliation possibility is more likely. They may have been a Celtic tribe (Belgic), related to the Suessiones that dwelt in Gallia Belgica, northern Gallia (Gaul) in today's Soissons area. Suessiones tribe, that dwelt in the Marne river territory, had a city called Corbio (today's Corbeil), like the Suessetani. So there is an association between the root words suess- and corb- in these two tribes (Corbeil comes from the galo-Celtic Corbio ialo – Corbius field).

It is not known when did they arrived in the region that they dwelt but some estimate that they arrived around 600 BCE, or maybe earlier, along with a belgic Celtic migration.

The place names (toponyms) and river names (hydronyms) of their territory are clearly indo-European, probably Celtic or pre-Celtic indo-European. The place names are for example: Corbio, Viridunum (Berdún), Gordunum (Gordún), Navardunum (Navardún), Sekia/Segia, Setia, Gallicum, Forum Gallorum. The river names are Alba (today's Arba river), Gallicus river (Gállego). This seems to indicate that they spoke an indo-European language, maybe a Celtic one.

== Roman conquest ==
Titus Livius wrote about Marcus Porcius Cato's campaigns in Hispania. In his work he reports that the Suessetani were enemies of the Iacetani, because, on other things, Iacetani sacked the fields and crops of the Suessetani. Marcus Porcius Cato (Cato the Elder), knowing the bad relations between Suessetani and Iacetani, took this to Roman advantage and managed to gain their support for the Roman conquest of the Iacetani territory and their capital, Iaca (Jaca), in 195 BCE.

So the Suessetani, at the beginning of the 2nd Century BCE, were Roman allies, but some years after they rebelled and resisted against Roman expansion, an action that had terrible consequences for the Suessetani as a tribe with his own identity. Because of this, their territory and capital was taken by a Roman army on the orders of the governor of Hispania Citerior, Aulus Terentius Varro, in the year 184 BCE. Corbio, the capital, had to be taken using siege weapons and was destroyed after that siege.

== Assimilation by the Vascones ==
The Vascones, that dwelt to the northwest of the Suessetani, in alliance with the Romans and with Roman incentive, took advantage of the Suessetani defeat, they took Suessetani lands and assimilated most of them in the middle and the end of the 2nd century BCE. The Suessetani ceased to exist as a different tribe with his own identity. When later authors such as Strabo and Ptolemy wrote their works (in the 1st century BCE and 1st century CE), the Suessetani had already been assimilated by the Vascones, as they don't mention them. They describe the Suessetani former territory as a vasconian one. Partially because of this, Suessetani are sometimes ignored as a different tribe or wrongly classified as a tribe of the Vascones or the Iberians.

== See also ==
- List of Celtic tribes
- Late Basquisation

== Bibliography ==
- Ángel Montenegro et alii, Historia de España 2 - colonizaciones y formación de los pueblos prerromanos (1200-218 a.C), Editorial Gredos, Madrid (1989) ISBN 84-249-1386-8
- Guillermo Fatás, Sobre Suessetanos Y Sedetanos, Archivo Español de Arqueología 44, pp. 109-125.
- Guillermo Fatás, "Los Pirineos meridionales y la conquista romana" (pp. 289-316) in Jürgen Untermann y Francisco Villar (Eds.), Lengua y Cultura en la Hispania Prerromana, Ediciones Universidad de Salamanca, Salamanca (1993) ISBN 84-7481-736-6
- J.J. Sayas, "El poblamiento romano en el área de los vascones", Veleia 1, 1984, pp. 289-310.
