= Iacetani =

Ancient people of the central Pyrenees

The Iacetani (also Iaccetani; Ancient Greek: Ἰακκητανοί) were an ancient people placed by Graeco-Roman geographers in the central Pyrenees, around the town of Iacca (modern Jaca, Aragon), during the Iron Age and the Roman period. They are named only by Strabo and Ptolemy, together with an editorial emendation of a passage of Pliny. Since the late 20th century their standing as a distinct people has been questioned. A body of recent scholarship holds that the name is a textual doublet of the Lacetani, the far better attested people of the plain around Ilerda and Osca, and that the settlement at Jaca belonged rather to the Vasconic sphere. A pre-Roman indigenous settlement beneath modern Jaca is nonetheless attested by excavation from the 2nd century BC.

== Name ==
They are mentioned as Iakkētanoí (Ἰακκητανοί) by Strabo (early 1st century AD), and as Iakkētanoi (Ἰακκητανοι; var. Ἀκκητάνοι, Ἠακκητάνοι) by Ptolemy (2nd century AD). A further occurrence in Pliny (1st century AD) rests on an emendation. The manuscripts read Lacetani, which Karl Mayhoff corrected to Iacetani, a change most editors decline to accept.

The ethnonym is formed on the name of the town of Iacca, whose indigenous form is rendered Iaka. The place-name survived in the Roman settlement of Iacca (Jaca). No ancient source names the Iacetani, the Lacetani and the coastal Laietani (Laeetani) together, and the three graphically similar names were repeatedly confused in the manuscript tradition and by medieval copyists. (Note: The Laeetani, or Laietani, of Pliny (NH 3:21) are the coastal people of the Barcelona plain, distinct from both the Iacetani and the Lacetani. The forms transmitted by each author for all three names are tabulated by Artica.)

== Geography ==
The Iberian Peninsula in the 3rd century BC.

The name of the Iacetani is attached to the district around Iacca, the modern Jacetania region in the central Pyrenees, which controls the Canal de Berdún and the routes toward the Somport pass. In the northern Pyrenean sequence of Pliny, the people (as Lacetani in the manuscripts) stands at the foot of the mountains, after the Ausetani and before the Cerretani and the Vascones. The descriptions of the region given by Strabo and Ptolemy do not, however, match the Pyrenean district around Jaca, a discrepancy that lies at the centre of the debate over the people's identity.

== Identity ==
The existence of the Iacetani as a distinct people was long upheld in scholarship. For much of the modern period most scholars treated them as one of the Iberian peoples.

However, that existence has been questioned since the late 20th century, on the grounds of the absence of a silver coinage struck in the name of Iacca, the lack of historical evidence for the people, and the probable confusion of the Iacetani with the Lacetani named by the Latin geographers. Several strands of the ancient evidence point the same way. The geographical account that Strabo attaches to the people describes a territory at the foothills of the Pyrenees, extending into the plain and bordering the land of Ilerda and Osca held by the Ilergetes, not far from the Iber. This matches the plain of the Lacetani rather than the mountain district of Jaca, and agrees with the placing of Lacetania by Livy at the foot of the Pyrenees. Strabo further calls the people the best known of the peoples of the Ebro valley, a description hard to reconcile with a group that has no historical record. The Lacetani, present in every conflict of the region, are otherwise absent from his account. The civil-war episodes that Strabo assigns to the people correspond to events recorded for the Lacetani, whose land is named Lacetania by Sallust and Cassius Dio. Strabo's use of the regional name Iakkētanía is itself the only such coinage he applies in the north-east of the peninsula, and elsewhere serves for the country of the Lacetani.

The testimony of Ptolemy tells against a Jaca-centred people in the same way. The ten cities Ptolemy assigns to the Iacetani, taking Iesso (Guissona) as their point of reference, cannot be reconciled with the town of Iákka, which he places instead among the Vascones, as the northernmost of their settlements between Oiassṓ (Irun) and Iákka. Julio Caro Baroja had already observed that the Iacetani and the Lacetani are never named together in the ancient sources, and on that basis corrected the attribution of the eso coinage from the former to the latter.

On these grounds most recent scholarship treats the two names as designating a single people, the Lacetani, and reads Iacetani as arising from textual corruption. On this reading the settlement at Jaca, placed by Ptolemy with the Vascones, belonged to the Vasconic sphere, into which Beltrán Lloris set the territory of Iacca on the strength of the scarce onomastic evidence. José María Gómez Fraile instead takes Lacetani as the form to be dropped and Iacetani as the people's name, resting this on the geographical context the sources give the two names and on the inconsistencies of Ptolemy's data. A separate proposal, going back to a suggestion of Wilhelm Meyer-Lübke and taken up by Pere Bosch Gimpera, made the Iacetani a people of possible Aquitanian origin whose territory was afterwards reassigned to the Vascones.

== History ==
Beneath the historic centre of modern Jaca lies a pre-Roman indigenous settlement, archaeologically visible from the 2nd century BC. The siege of an unnamed Pyrenean town during the campaign of Cato in 195 BC, recorded by Livy, has traditionally been read as the capture of Jaca, and on that reading has been taken as the earliest notice of the people. This identification, which goes back to the 19th-century work of Emil Hübner and was maintained by later scholars including Bosch Gimpera, has been doubted in recent scholarship. (Note: The ancient accounts do not name the besieged oppidum, and Livy's description of it as longum in latitudinem does not suit the topography of Jaca. Livy's episode is referred to the Lacetani and confirmed by Frontinus and Plutarch, while a further passage of Livy records rivalry between the Suessetani and the Lacetani in the same region.) The town Livy describes is now generally referred to the Lacetani, whose part in the campaign is confirmed by Frontinus and Plutarch.

After the Roman conquest the settlement continued as Iacca, which acquired a fully developed Roman urban layout in the high empire and suffered the general crisis of the western Ebro cities in the last third of the 3rd century AD.
