= Sedetani =

Ancient people of the Iberian Peninsula

The Iberian Peninsula in the 3rd century BC

The Sedetani were an ancient Iberian (Pre-Roman) people of the Iberian Peninsula (the Roman Hispania). They are believed to have spoken a form of the Iberian language.

== Location ==
Their territory extended from central to southern present-day Aragon, bordering with the lands of the Ilercavones in the east and the Edetani to the south. Some of their main towns were Salduie (Salduba in the ancient Roman sources), located in present-day Zaragoza, and the Cabezo de Alcalá near Azaila.

== Culture ==
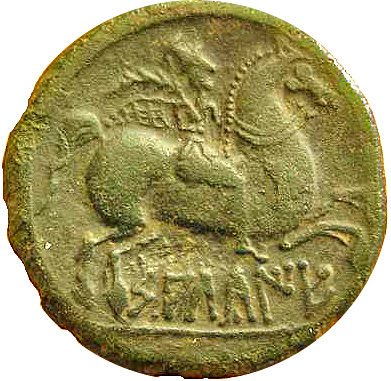
Coin from the Sedetani town of Salduie

Like other ancient Hispanic peoples, the Sedetani minted their own coins since the early 2nd century BC.

== History ==
Submitted to Carthaginian rule in the 3rd century BC, the Sedetani were obliged to provide mercenary troops to the Punic armies during the Second Punic War, for Silius Italicus describes a Sedetani contingent in Hannibal's army, being led by two chieftains named Mandonius and Caeso.

== See also ==
- Iberians
- Pre-Roman peoples of the Iberian Peninsula
