= Iberian revolt =

197–195 BC revolt against the Romans

Iberian revolt (197–195 BC)
- Part of Roman conquest of the Iberian Peninsula
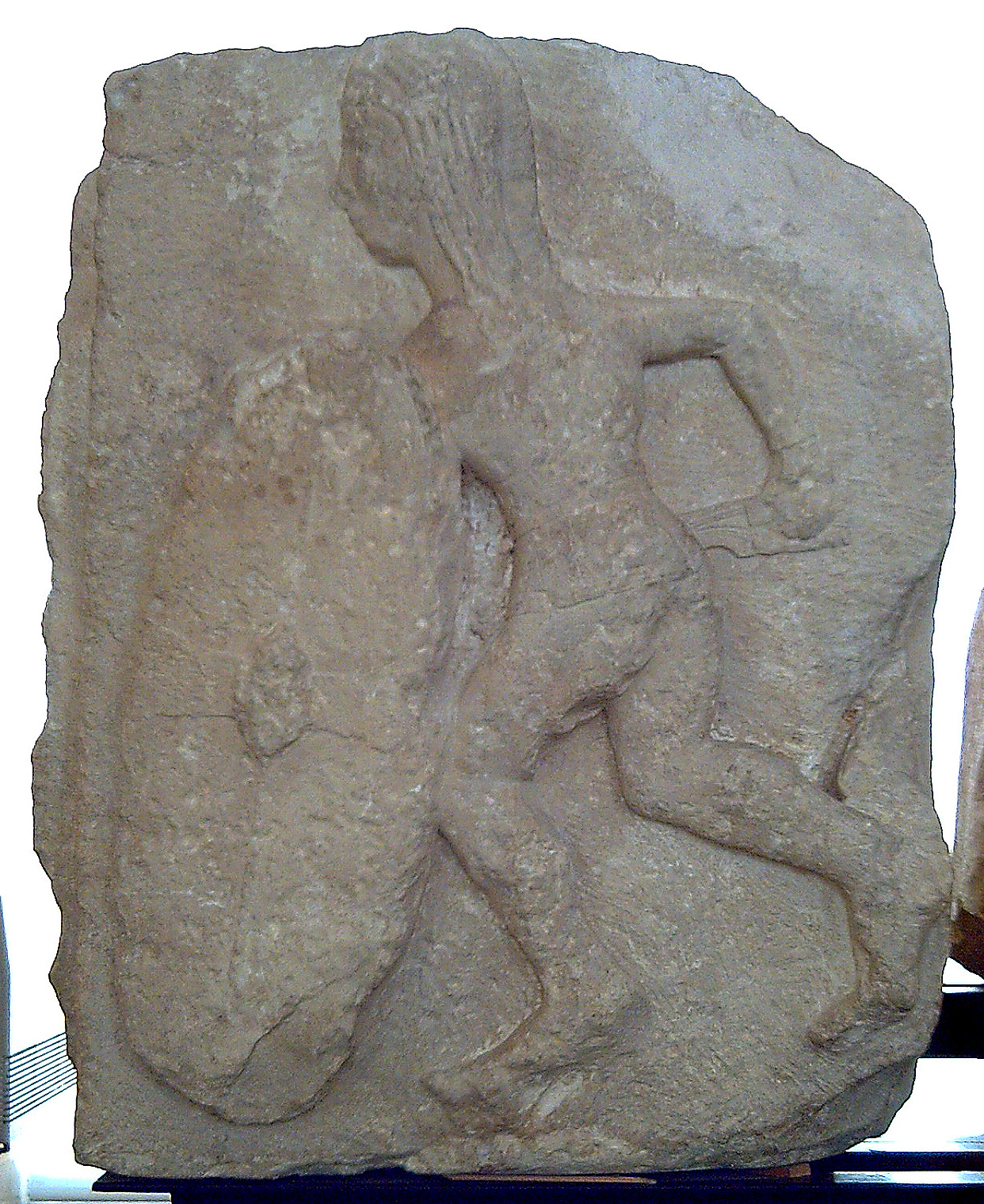
- Warrior armed with falcata and oval shield. Iberian work, part of the so-called Osuna sculptures. 3rd–1st century BC. MAN
Date	197–195 BC (2 years)
Location	Hispania
Result	Roman victory
Territorial changes	Rome re-establishes control over Hispania.

Belligerents
Rome: -Ilergetes	Iberian rebels: -Celtiberians; -Indigetes; -Bergistani; -Lacetani; -Suessetani; -Ausetani

Commanders and leaders
Cato the Elder; Gaius Sempronius Tuditanus; Marcus Helvius Blasio; Quintus Minucius Thermus; Quintus Fabius Buteo; Publius Manlius; Appius Claudius Nero; Bilistages	Culcas; Luxinio; Budar; Besadino

The Iberian revolt (197–195 BC) was a rebellion of the Iberian peoples of the provinces Citerior and Ulterior, created shortly before in Hispania by the Roman state to regularize the government of these territories, against that Roman domination in the 2nd century BC.

From 197 BC, the Roman Republic divided its conquests in the south and east of the Iberian Peninsula into two provinces: Hispania Citerior and Hispania Ulterior, each governed by a praetor. Although several causes have been put forward as possibly responsible for the conflict, the most widely accepted is that derived from the administrative and fiscal changes produced by the transformation of the territory into two provinces.

The revolt having begun in the Ulterior province, Rome sent the praetors Gaius Sempronius Tuditanus to the Citerior province and Marcus Helvius Blasio, to Ulterior. Shortly before the rebellion spread to the Citerior province, Gaius Sempronius Tuditanus was killed in action. However, Marcus Helvius Blasion, who upon arriving in his province ran headlong into the revolt, won an important victory over the Celtiberians at the Battle of Iliturgi. The situation was still far from under control, and Rome sent the praetores Quintus Minucius Thermus and Quintus Fabius Buteo in a further attempt to settle the conflict. However, although the latter achieved some victories, such as at the Battle of Turda, where Quintus Minucius even managed to capture the Hispanic general Besadino, they also failed to fully resolve the situation.

It was then that Rome had to send in 195 BC. the consul Marcus Porcius Cato in command of a consular army to suppress the revolt, who, when he arrived in Hispania found the entire Citerior province in revolt, with Roman forces controlling only a few fortified cities. Cato established an alliance with Bilistages, king of the Ilergetes, and had also the support of Publius Manlius, newly appointed praetor of Hispania Citerior and sent as assistant consul. Cato headed for the Iberian Peninsula, disembarked at Rhode and put down the rebellion of the Hispanics occupying the square. He then moved with his army to Emporion, where the greatest battle of the contest would be fought, against an autochthonous army vastly superior in numbers. After a long and difficult battle, the consul achieved total victory, managing to inflict 40 000 casualties on the enemy ranks. After Cato's great victory in this decisive battle, which had decimated the Hispanic forces, the Citerior province fell back under Roman control.

On the other hand, the Ulterior province remained uncontrolled, and the consul had to head towards Turdetania to support the praetors Publius Manlius and Appius Claudius Nero. Cato tried to establish an alliance with the Celtiberians, who acted as mercenaries paid by the Turdetani and whose services he needed, but failed to convince them. After a show of force, passing with the Roman Legions through Celtiberian territory, he convinced them to return to their lands. The submission of the autochthonous army was only an appearance, and when rumor spread of Cato's departure for Rome, the rebellion resumed. Cato had to act again with decision and effectiveness, defeating the rebels definitively in the battle of Bergium. Finally, Cato sold the captives into slavery and the autochthonous of the province were disarmed.

== Historical background ==
Phases of the Conquest of Hispania

Development of the Second Punic War.

The Second Punic War was in its final stretch. The Carthaginian generals Magon Barca and Hasdrubal Gisco had retreated towards Gades, which allowed Scipio Africanus to take over the entire southern Iberian Peninsula. Scipio then crossed into Africa to hold a meeting with the Numidian king Syphax, whom he had previously encountered in Hispania, with the intention of forging an alliance.

Shortly thereafter, Scipio became seriously ill and seizing the opportunity, 8000 Roman soldiers, who were dissatisfied at having received lower pay than usual, and, moreover, lacked authorization to plunder enemy towns, revolted and started a mutiny; this mutiny was the perfect occasion seized by the Ilergetes and other Iberian peoples to revolt, led by the leaders Indibilis (of the Ilergetes) and Mandonius (of the Ausetani), a rebellion directed above all against the proconsuls Lucius Cornelius Lentulus and Lucius Manlius Acidinus. Lucius Manlius succeeded in defeating the Ausetani and the Ilergetes, who had rebelled against the Republic in the absence of Scipio Africanus. He returned to Rome in 199 BC, but was not granted the ovation that the senate had awarded him because of opposition from the tribune of the plebs Publius Porcius Laeca. Publius Scipio succeeded in putting down the mutiny and brought the Iberian revolt to a bloody end. Mandonius was captured and executed (205 BC), while Indibilis managed to escape.

Magon Barca and Hasdrubal Gisco left Gades with all their ships and troops to go to the Italian Peninsula in support of Hannibal, and after the departure of these forces, Rome was master of all southern Hispania. Rome now dominated from the Pyrenees to the Algarve, following the coast. The territory controlled by the Roman armies reached as far as Huesca, and from there southward to the Ebro and eastward to the sea. The victory of the Republic of Rome over Carthage in the Second Punic War left Hispania definitively in their hands.

When Scipio Africanus left after his Hispanic campaigns, the Iberian chiefs who had supported him, and who still enjoyed a certain political structure and capacity to react, considered that they were only linked by a personal relationship with their rex Scipio and had no duty to the Roman Republic, so they took up arms against the latter. Other causes for the uprising have been proposed, however, such as the death of Indibilis and Mandonius at the hands of the Romans; or the most widely accepted, the high tributes that the Hispaniids had to pay to Rome, especially after the transformation of the territory into two provinces.

== Forces in combat ==
Hispanic armies		Roman units	
Composition	Quantity	Composition	Quantity
Battle of Iliturgi:		Praetor of Hispania Citerior:	
Celtiberians	20 000	Infantrymen (permanent troops)	4000
Battle of Turda:		Cavalry (permanent troops)	200
Iberians	+ 12 000	1 Legion (reinforcements 196 BC)	4200
Battle of Emporion:		Infantrymen (reinforcements 196 BC)	2000
Iberians (probably indigetes)	40 000	Cavalry (reinforcements 196 BC)	150
Turdetania:		Infantrymen (reinforcements 195 BC)	2000
Celtiberians	10 000	Cavalry (reinforcements 195 BC)	200
Turdetani	Undetermined number	Praetor of Hispania Ulterior:	
		Infantrymen (permanent troops)	4000
		Cavalry (permanent troops)	200
		1 Legion (reinforcements 196 BC)	4200
		Infantrymen (reinforcements 196 BC)	2000
		Cavalry (reinforcements 196 BC)	150
		Infantrymen (reinforcements 195 BC)	2000
		Cavalry (reinforcements 195 BC)	200
		Manipular army:	
		2 Legions	8400
		Cavalry	800
		Allies	15 000
Total	+ 82 000		~ 50 000

== First confrontations ==
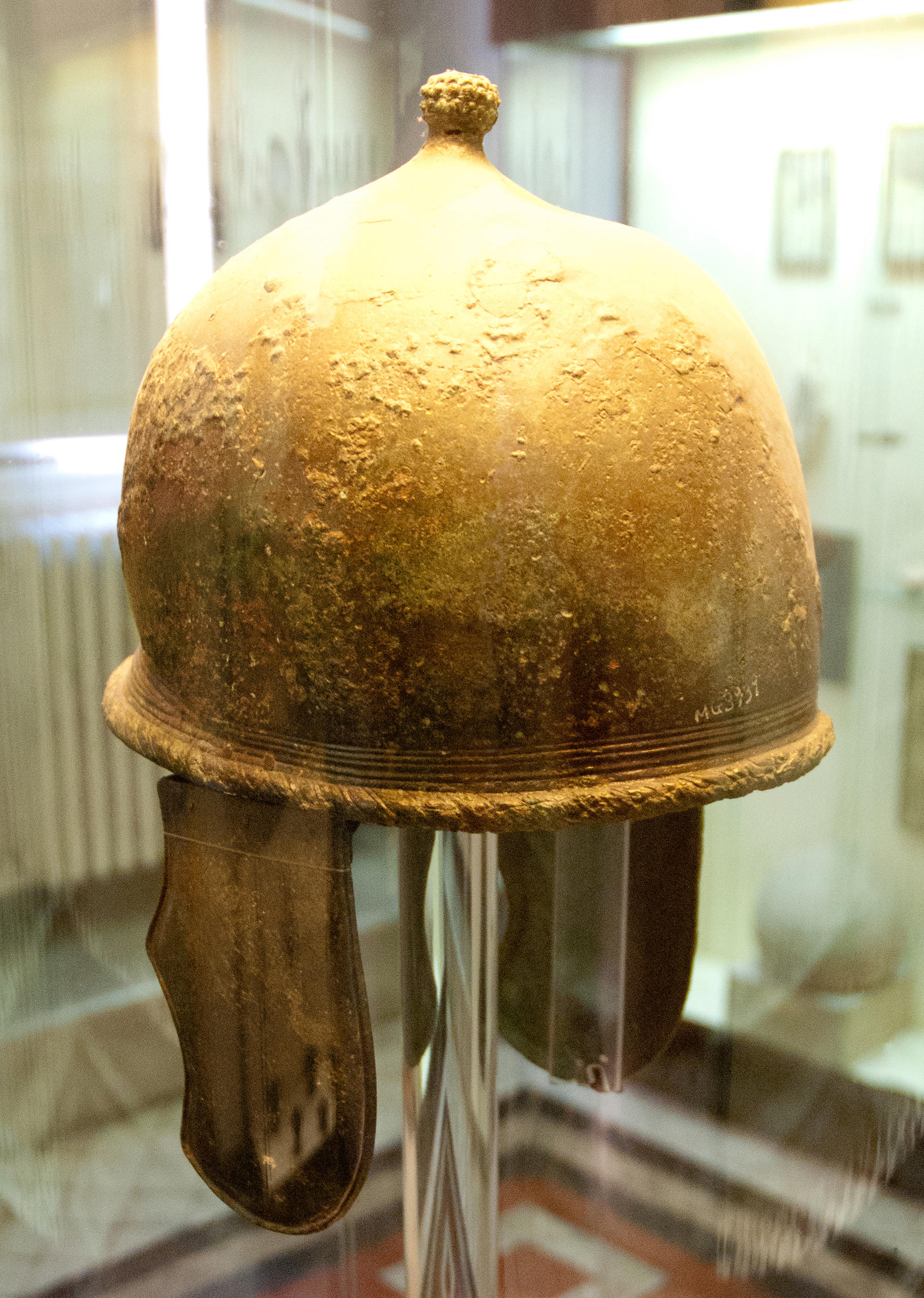
Montefortino type helmet from Italy, common in the equipment of the Roman legionaries from centuries 3 to 1 BC

The new provincial division of Hispania in the year 197 BC

The Roman Republic divided in 197 BC. its conquests in the south and east of the Iberian Peninsula into two provinces: Hispania Citerior (east coast, from the Pyrenees to Cartagena), later called Tarraconensis with capital in Tarraco, and Hispania Ulterior (approximately present-day Andalusia), with capital in Corduba, each governed by a praetor. The transformation of the territory into two provinces caused important administrative and fiscal changes, and the imposition of the stipendium was not accepted by the local tribes, so that in 197 BC, just after the Second Macedonian War was over, a great revolt broke out throughout the conquered area in Hispania because of the republican spoliation.

The new provinces needed rulers, so the Republic sent the praetors Gaius Sempronius Tuditanus to Hispania Citerior and Marcus Helvius Blasion to Hispania Ulterior with a total of 8000 infants and 800 horsemen to discharge veterans, and the order to delimit the borders of the provinces. When Marcus Helvius arrived in his corresponding province he encountered a large revolt, whereupon he informed the senate. Numerous local chiefs had revolted in Hispania Ulterior, among them the regula Culcas at the head of the armies of 17 cities, and the Regulus Luxinio, commanding the forces of the cities of Carmo and Bardo. The cities of Malaca, Sexi and all of Baeturia had also joined the revolt.

Shortly thereafter, the war, which had begun in the Ulterior province, spread also to Citerior, in which its praetor, Gaius Sempronius Tuditanus, had died of wounds suffered in battle, along with many soldiers, at the end of 197 BC; and the province was left without a praetor until the following year. It is likely that Marcus Helvius himself, praetor of the Ulterior, also assumed control of the Citerior until the arrival of Sempronius' successor.

Quintus Minucius Thermus and Quintus Fabius Buteo were the praetores elected in 196 BC to take charge of Hispania Citerior and Hispania Ulterior respectively. They were given reinforcements consisting of two legions, 4000 infantry and 300 horsemen, and ordered to leave in haste for the provinces to continue the war. Quintus Minucius Thermus defeated the insurgent Budar and Besadines at an undetermined place called Turda, caused 12 000 casualties in the Hispanic ranks, and trapped general Besadines. Quintus Minucius consequently received the honor of triumphus upon his return to Rome in 195 BC

== Roman victory at Iliturgi ==
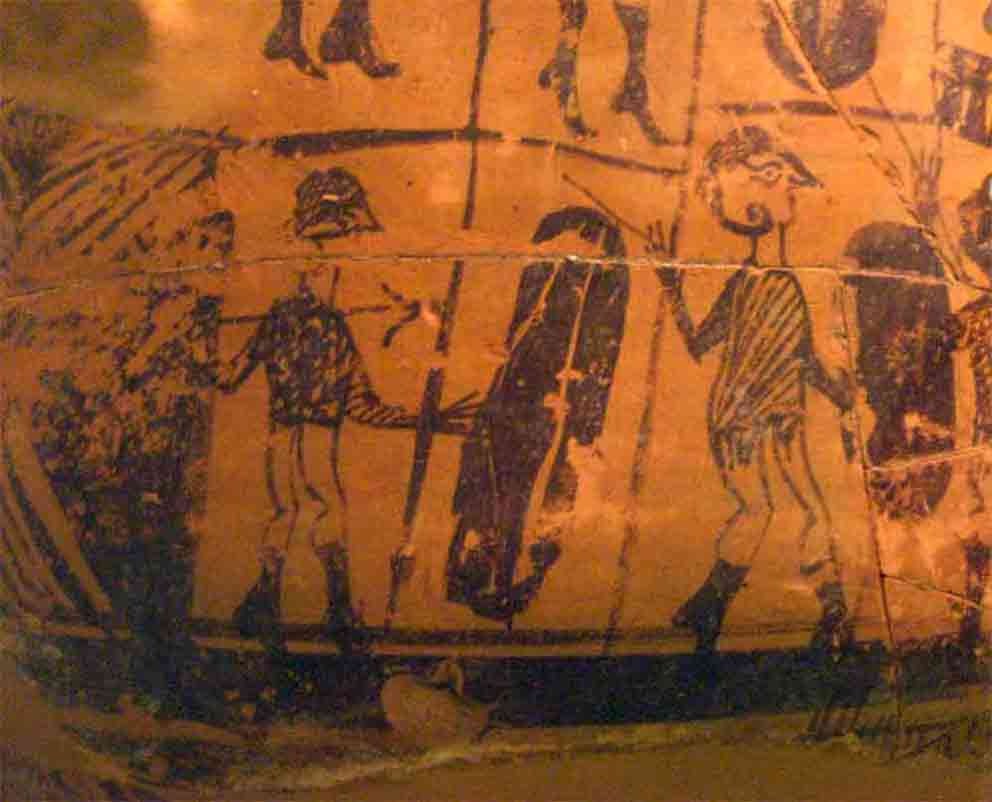
Iberian warriors armed with spear and oblong shield on a vase from Lliria (Valencia)

Given the limited success of the praetor of 196 BC in Hispania Citerior, the Roman Senate had declared it a "consular province", since the intervention of a consular army was necessary to control the situation. Elected consul in 195 BC together with his friend Lucius Valerius Flaccus it fell to Marcus Porcius Cato, the Elder by lot to take charge of Hispania Citerior. Also elected were the praetores for Hispania Ulterior and Hispania Citerior, Appius Claudius Nero and Publius Manlius, respectively, with their allotted forces, although, due to the emergency situation, they were allowed 2000 more infantrymen and 200 more horsemen, to be added to the legions their predecessors had disposed of. The consul Marcus Porcius Cato, who had been unable to prevent the annulment of the Oppian Law, embarked with his troops for Hispania to take charge of the Citerior province with Publius Manlius as assistant, leaving the Ulterior to Appius Claudius.

Marcus Helvius Blasion, although he had already handed over the government of the province to his successor, had to stay in Hispania due to a long illness. Now recovered, with a guard of 6000 soldiers posted for him by the praetor Appius Claudius Nero, he was attacked by 20 000 Celtiberians near Iliturgi. Marcus Helvius managed to repel the attackers, defeated them, and inflicted about 12 000 casualties on them. Iliturgi was occupied by the Romans, and this victory earned Marcus Helvius Blasion an ovatio granted by the senate in 195 BC; however, he was ineligible for the triumphus, having fought in a province that belonged to another praetor. Upon his arrival in Rome Marcus Helvius made delivery to the Republic of 14 732 pounds of uncoined silver, 17 023 coined and 119 439 of oscensian silver. Marcus Helvius was thus arriving in Rome two years later than planned. Such quantities of wealth taken from Hispania give an idea of the unrest of the autochthonous peoples, the probable cause of the uprising.

== Landing of Cato in Hispania ==
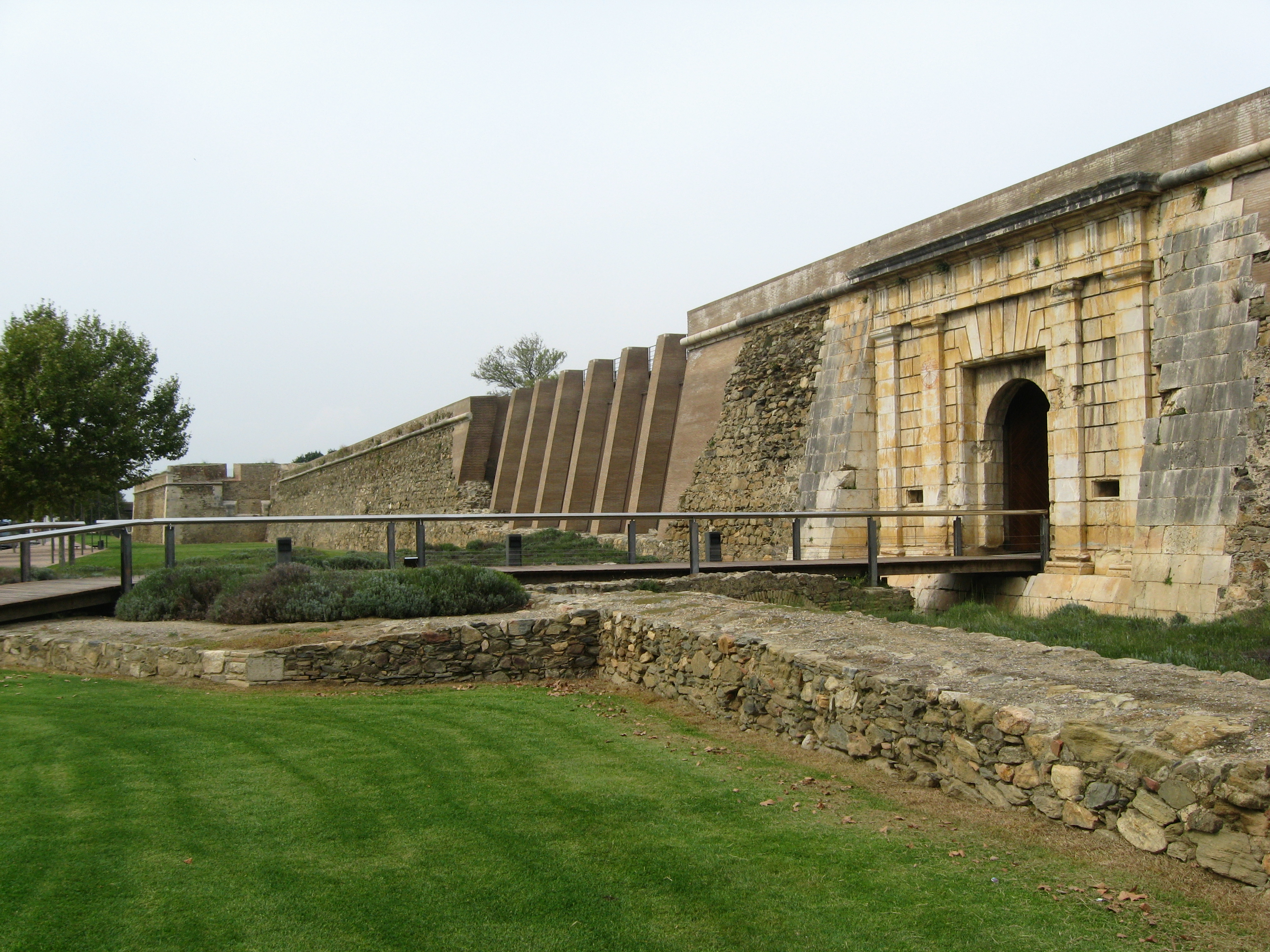
The Citadel of Roses, probable site of the battle.

Marcus Porcius Cato the Elder was endowed by the Roman Senate with a consular army, composed of two legions, 8000 infantrymen, 15 000 allies and 800 horsemen, plus 20 ships for the transport of the troops; to all this were added as reinforcements 2000 infantrymen and 200 horsemen for each of the praetors, making a total of 50 000 (Note: Götzfriez talks of some 70 000 soldiers —Götzfried (1907, p. 50)) which seems to be excessive if the forces of the units present in Hispania are added up one by one. men among the three armies. Cato embarked his army on 25 ships, 5 of them with allied troops, departed from Portus Lunae (Luni, Italy) and skirted the Gulf of Leon to reach Hispania, the northern part of the Citerior province. The Roman army disembarked at Rhode, in the Gulf of Roses, around June 195 BC, with its 25 quinqueremes, to defeat an autochthonous army of the area. The consul, who on his arrival in Hispania found himself in a complicated military situation, only personally carried about 20 000 men, since the rest were carried by the praetors; so that with these meager forces Cato faced the battle.

=== Siege of the citadel ===
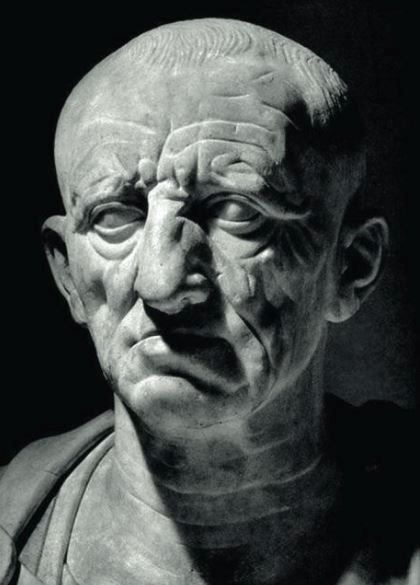
The consul Marcus Porcius Cato, the Elder, architect of the Roman victory.

The Iberian settlements were usually built on hills, in strategic locations, controlling the passageways, which gave them an important advantage over enemies; they were usually surrounded by large walls, on which watchtowers and the gates of the city were arranged.

Most (...) were not conceived to repel formal sieges that would never come, not only because the fortifications exercised an effective military deterrent role but because the attacker would have no interest in besieging the city. A quick or surprise assault on a farm, fine; a swarming entry through an open gate when pursuing a fleeing enemy, all right (...) but a prolonged siege would be meaningless in the Iberian way of understanding war (...) it would be better to return to plunder the fields and seek surprise the following spring.

— Fernando Quesada Sanz

The square fell definitively in July 195 BC. Cato sacked the city and then fought against the Indians and put down the resistance of the Iberian garrison located on Puig Rom, or Rhode acropolis, surely the Citadel of Roses.

== Arrival of the Roman army at Emporion ==
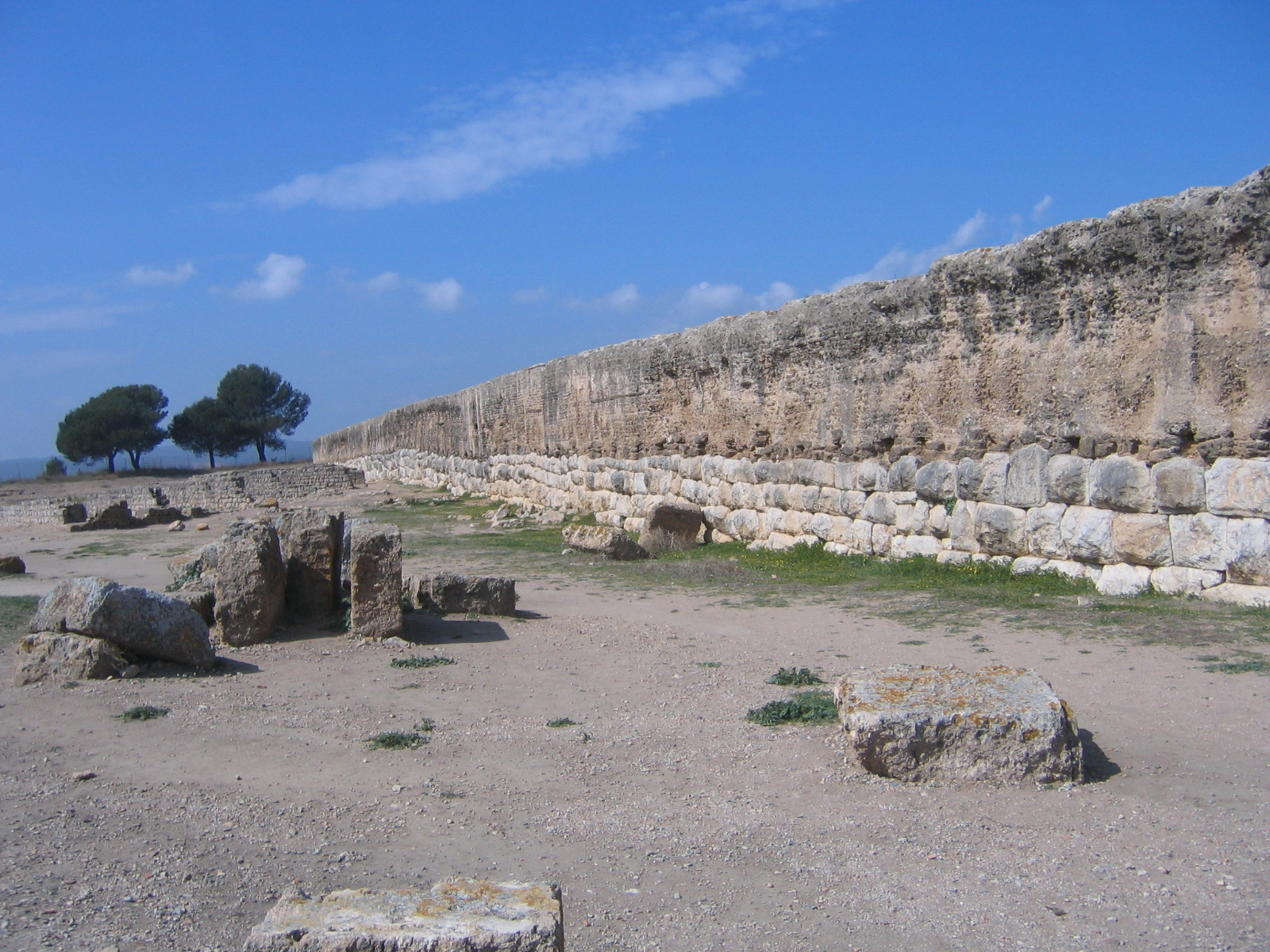
Roman wall of Emporion.

The Roman army then landed at Emporion, and Cato the Elder had the ships return to Massalia with merchants to force his army into the fight:

Bellum se ipsum alet

— Marcus Porcius Cato the Elder

(In English: "War feeds itself."), a phrase uttered by Cato during the contest when he refused to buy additional supplies for his army.

Titus Livius describes what the Roman army finds upon its arrival at Emporion:

Emporion consisted of two cities separated by a wall. One city was inhabited by Greeks from Phocis, like the Massaliotes, and the other by Hispanics. The Greek city, close to the sea, was surrounded by a wall of less than 400 paces. The Hispanic city, farther from the coast, had a wall with a perimeter of 3,000 paces (...) The part of the wall facing the land, well fortified, had only one gate guarded by a magistrate in turn. At night they mounted guard on the walls the third part of the citizens stood guard on the walls (...)

— Titus Livius (translation by J.A. Villar Vidal and revision by J. Solis)

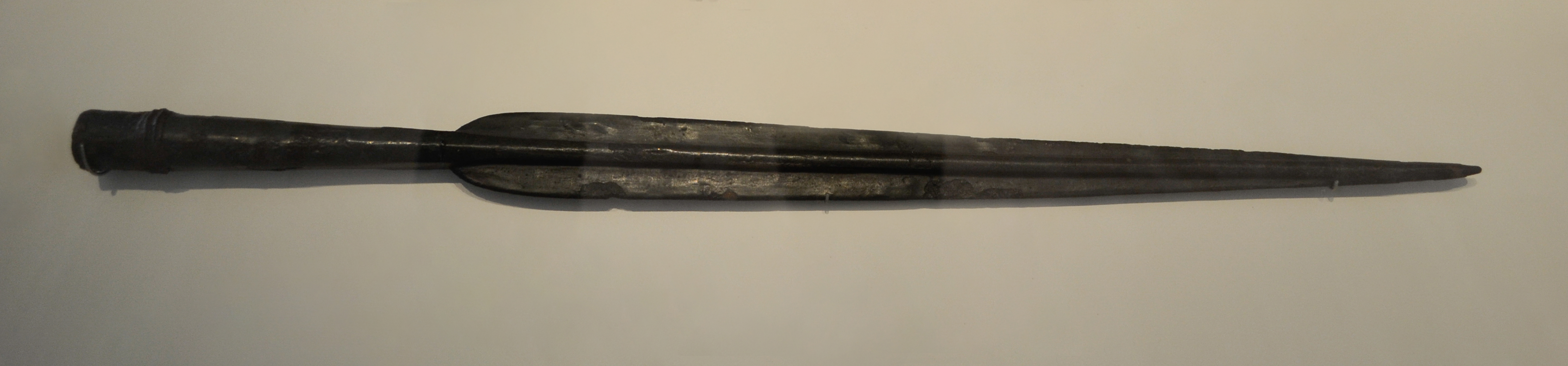
Iron spear point of Iberian iron. Los Collados Necropolis (Almedinilla, Córdoba). 4th century BC. National Archaeological Museum of Spain.

Marcus Porcius Cato would start in Emporion, an almost island surrounded by marshes, where the Greek city and the Iberian city coexisted separated by a wall, a tough confrontation against a huge Hispanic army. Upon their arrival in the city, Cato and his troops received a warm welcome from the Greek inhabitants.

=== Encounter with the Ilergetes allies ===
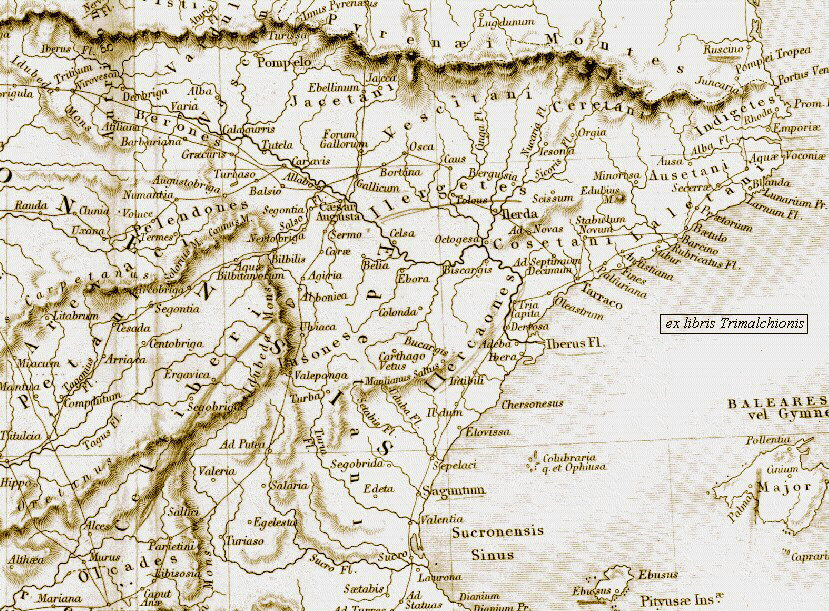
Map of the northeast of Hispania, with names of the pre-Roman peoples

At this time three legates ilergetes arrived at the Roman camp, one of whom was the son of king Bilistages. These exposed to the consul that the Ilergetes cities were under attack, and that if they did not receive immediate help they would not be able to withstand the siege of their strongholds, for which they asked him for at least 3000 men. Cato replied that he understood the danger and concern of the Ilergetes, but that he had to fight a battle against a large army and could not spare any soldiers. The Ilergetes pleaded with him for help since they had no allies besides Rome, as they were the only ones who had remained loyal to the Republic and the rest of the autochthonous peoples were now their enemies. The legates left the camp disappointed by the Romans' response. The consul did not want to leave the allies to their fate, but neither could he afford to leave soldiers behind, so he hatched a plan to give the Ilergetes hope so that they would fight with higher morale. The next morning Cato called the legates and told them that he would help them; he ordered a third of the soldiers to prepare to go out to the aid of the Ilergetes in two days, and he did the same with the ships. The legates left the camp after seeing the soldiers embark. After a prudent time, Cato ordered the embarked soldiers to leave the ships.

Cato remained a few days on the outskirts of the city analyzing the enemy troops and training his soldiers. At this time he visited the camp Marcus Helvius, (Note: According to Martínez Gázquez, the encounter could not have taken place at this time, but must have been later. —Martínez Gázquez (1992, p. 58)) making a stop on his return journey to Rome, protected by 6000 soldiers on loan from the praetor Appius Claudius, after having won at Iliturgi. Since the area was now safe, Helvius returned the men to Appius Claudius and embarked for Rome.

=== Preparations for the decisive battle ===
Roman fortified camp: 1. Principia 2. Via Praetoria (Praetorian or transversal path) 3. Via Principalis (Main path) 4. Porta Principalis Dextra (Right door) 5. Porta Praetoria (Front door) 6. Porta Principalis Sinistra (Left door) 7. Porta Decumana (Back door)

When Cato considered that his soldiers were ready to face the autochthonous in the open field, he ordered his troops to head for castra hiberna, a second camp located 3000 paces from the city on the mainland, in enemy-controlled territory, from where he whipped the rebels at night by burning their fields and plundering their crops and livestock, thus demoralizing their enemies. In this way he trained the soldiers and terrified the enemies, to the point that they dared less and less to leave the city. Moreover, the consul ordered 300 soldiers to abduct a sentry for interrogation.

Cato's army of about 20 000 men initially, to which casualties from the battle of Rhode would have to be subtracted, was vastly outnumbered by the forces of the autochthonous army. The revolted army besieging Emporion, of about 40 000 men, was partially disbanded in the harvest season, moment taken advantage of by Marcus Porcius Cato to attack the camp. Then the consul addressed his men:

The occasion has come which you have often wished for, when opportunity would present itself for you to show your valor. Hitherto you have fought more like thieves than warriors; now, in regular fighting, you will come to grips with enemy against enemy; henceforth you may not devastate the fields, but empty the cities of their riches. Our ancestors being in Hispania the generals and the army of the Carthaginians and not having themselves in it any soldiers, wanted, however, that in the treaty was added this clause, that the river Ebro would be the limit of their empire. Now, when Hispania has fallen to the lot of two praetors, a consul and three Roman armies, when for almost ten years there has been no Carthaginian in these provinces, we have lost our empire beyond the Ebro. It is necessary to recover it with your arms and your courage and to force this people, who are more reckless for rebellion than constant for resistance, to accept again the yoke, which has been removed.

— Marcus Porcius Cato (Translation by José Martínez Gázquez)

=== Tactical disposition used by Cato ===
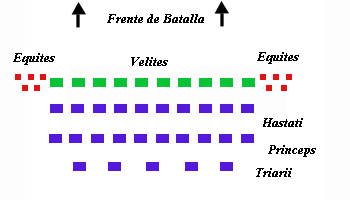
Disposition of the legion's maniple on the battlefield.

During the night, Cato took the most advantageous position, keeping a legion in reserve, and placing the cavalry (equites) at the ends of the line and the infantry in the center; typical disposition of a "maniple army" of the Republican era. The manipuli were organized in three distinct battle lines (in Latin, triplex acies) each based on a type of heavy infantry: hastati, princeps and triarii: the hastati, infantrymen covered with leather armor, breastplates and helmets, formed in the front line of battle. They carried a wooden shield, reinforced with iron, a sword called gladius and two throwing spears known as pila (a heavy pilum and a smaller javelin). The princeps, heavy infantrymen, usually formed the second line of soldiers. They were armed and protected in the same way as the hastati, but wore lighter chain mail instead of solid armour. In the third line were the triarii. Their weapons and armor were similar to those of the princeps, with the exception that their main weapon was a pike instead of the two pila. The equites, finally, were placed on both flanks of the battle formation.

The Iberian warriors, besides being superior in numbers, also had effective weapons, such as the gladius, falcata, the soliferrum or the pugio, a dagger later adopted by Rome for its army.

Several historians have praised the quality of Iberian weapons, such as swords. Dion Cassius, Polybius, Diodorus Siculus, and Titus Livius in particular make explicit reference to the "Hispanic swords", to which they attribute an unsurpassed quality:

These swords cut through anything, and the quality of their iron is so extraordinary that there is no shield, helmet or bone that can resist them.

— Diodorus Siculus

=== Development of the battle ===
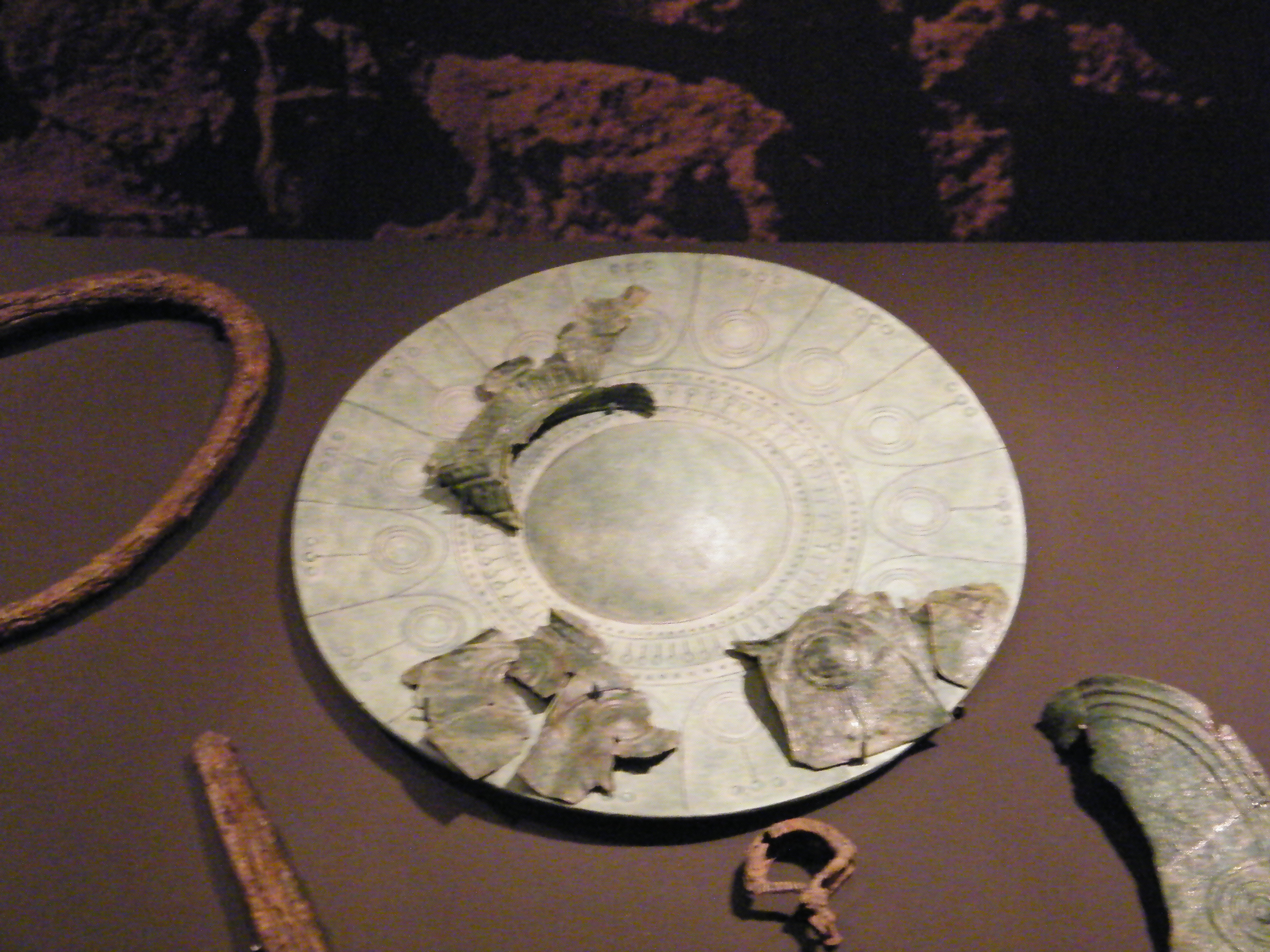
Fragment of umbo of Iberian shield of bronze, decorated with ovals and concentric circles. Necropolis of Cabezo Lucero (Guardamar del Segura). First half of the 4th century BC. Archaeological Museum of Alicante.

Early in the morning Cato the Elder sent three cohorts to the fence of the Iberian camp, which caused surprise in the Hispanics, who did not expect an attack from behind. The Roman army was then positioned between the enemies and its own camp, a maneuver used by the consul to force his men into the fight, preventing desertions. Cato then ordered the attackers to feign retreat, so that the Iberians pursued them in disorderly fashion, rushing to the outside of the camp fence, at which point the Roman cavalry appeared on their right flank; however the latter was overcome and retreated in fright, and a part of the infantry also, so that Cato had to send two relief cohorts to surround the attackers on the right, which were to arrive before the encounter of the lines of infantry.

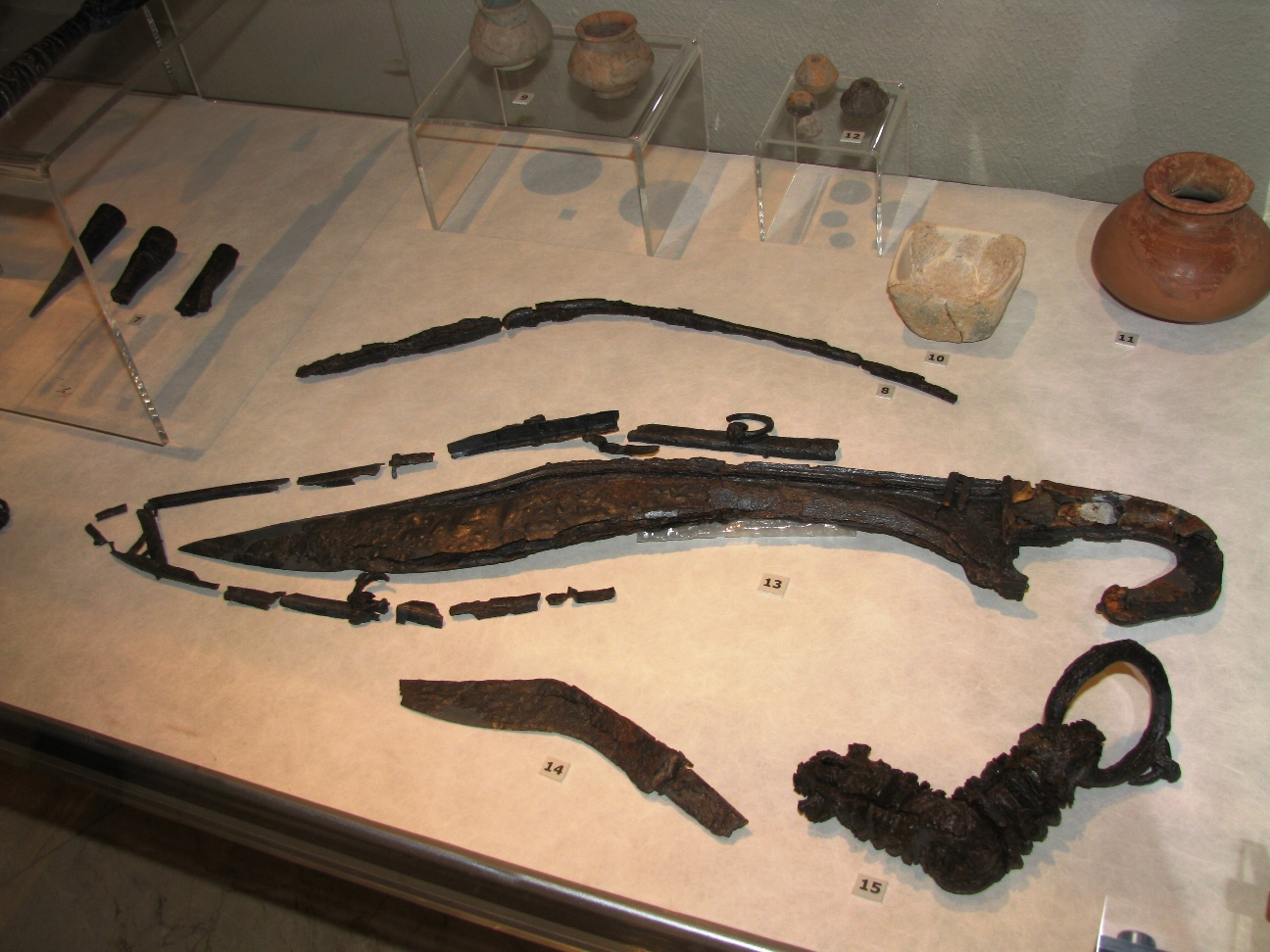
Falcata and other Iberian combat elements from the Villena Archaeological Museum, 4th century BC

The fear provoked in the Hispanic troops by the maneuver matched the initial fear of the Roman cavalry on the right wing. The battle was very evenly matched while fought with throwing weapons; on the right flank the Iberians dominated, while on the left and in the center the Romans were stronger, who also awaited the arrival of two reinforcing cohorts. The battle being evenly matched, in the evening, Cato attacked in wedge with three reserve cohorts, which had been waiting in the second line, after which a new battle front was established and achieved the disbandment of the Iberians. Cato ordered the second legion, which had remained in the rear, to form up and attacked the enemy camp by night. The refreshed legion arrived and concentrated at the camp fence, where the Hispanics were fiercely employed to protect it from the assailants; then Cato observed that the Iberian resistance was least at the left gate, so he ordered the hastati and princeps of the second legion to move toward it.

The defenders of the gate did not withstand the assault and the Romans managed to enter. Taking advantage of the confusion, the rest of the legion finished off the defenders and the Roman army achieved total victory. According to Valerius Antias, the Hispanics suffered 40 000 casualties in the battle. Once hostilities were over the consul gave his men rest and put the substantial booty up for sale.

After the battle not only the inhabitants of Emporion surrendered, but also those of the nearby cities. Cato treated them with propriety and even helped them, and then let them go to their homes.

== End of hostilities in the province of Citerior ==
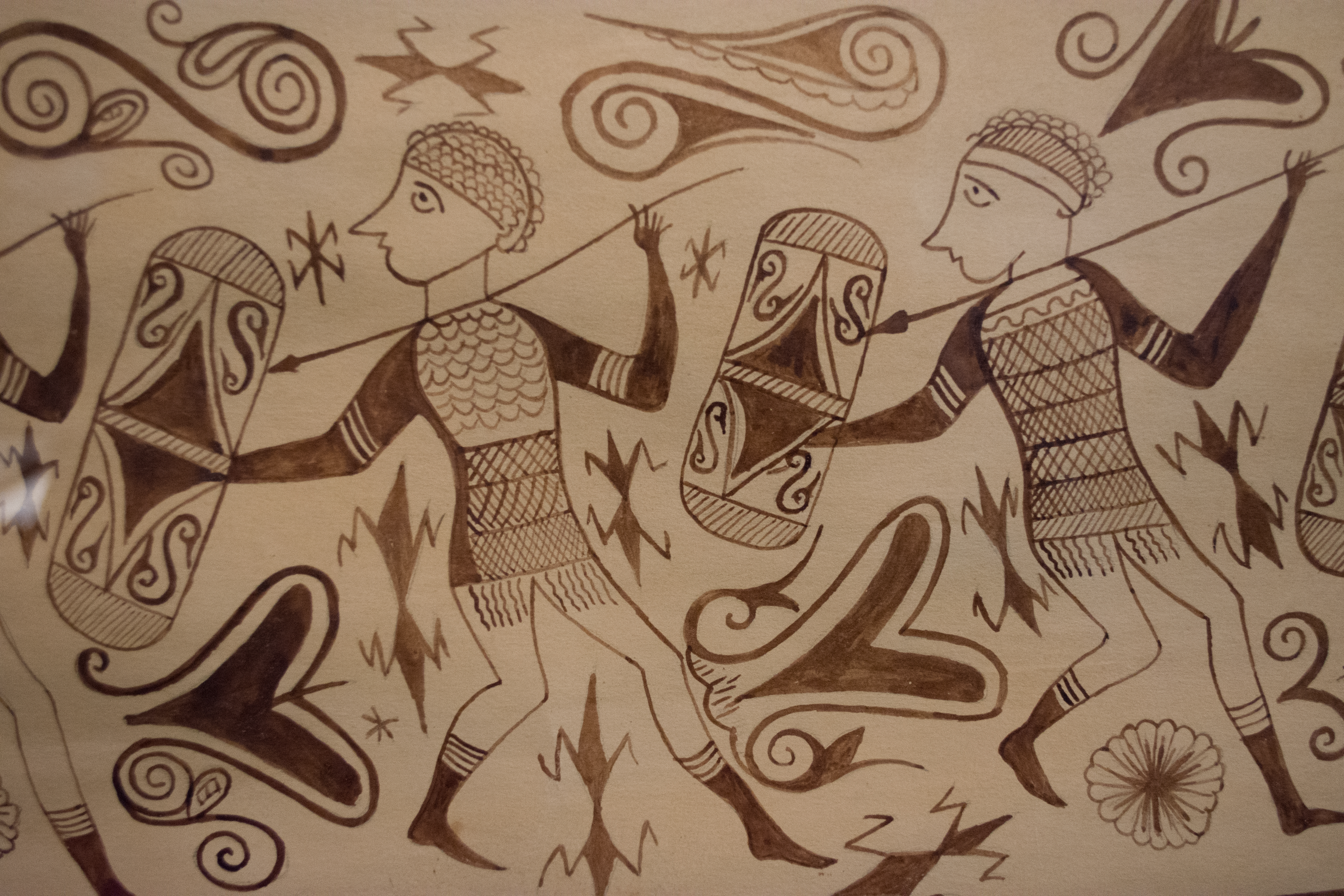
Edeta vase from Tossal de Sant Miquel (Valencia) with representation of Iberian warriors

With the victory at Emporion Marcus Porcius Cato had achieved the pacification of all Hispania Citerior; all the way to Tarraco all the cities were surrendering to him, and they were handing over to him the Romans they held as prisoners.

Shortly thereafter news spread that the consul was leaving with his army for Turdetania, which some Bergistani peoples took advantage of to take up arms. Cato easily put down the revolt on up to two occasions, but was not so lenient on the second and sold the vanquished into slavery. The tactic employed by Cato on this occasion was to reach the villages earlier than expected, thus attacking the revolters by surprise. After this, Cato ordered the disarmament of all the inhabitants of the province Citerior.

The consul called upon the representatives of the Hispanic cities in the area to take measures voluntarily so that they could not rebel again against Rome. Finding no response from the Hispanics Cato had the walls of all the cities torn down.

== The war in the Ulterior province ==
=== Revolt of the Turdetani ===
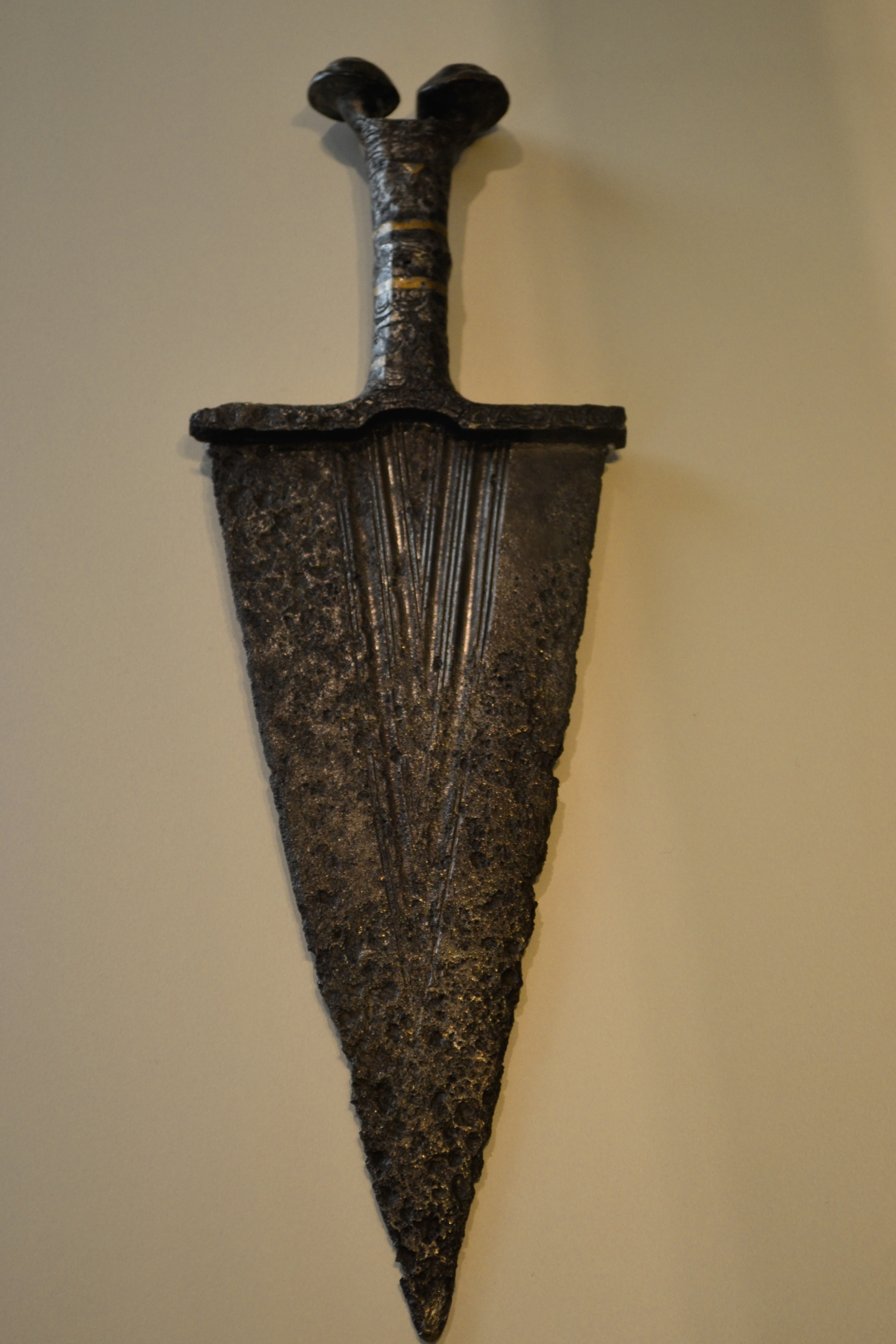
Iberian dagger with atrophied antennae made of iron and silver, from Almedinilla. Centuries 4th and 3rd BC. MAN

The praetors Appius Claudius Nero and Publius Manlius were in Turdetania, waging war against the Turdetani themselves and against the Celtiberians mercenaries they had hired, achieving some victories. These were not, however, difficult victories, since the praetors had a good number of horsemen and veteran soldiers. But subsequently the Turdetani hired another 10 000 Celtiberians, and began to prepare again for combat.

After a triumphant campaign, Cato led his troops to Sierra Morena, Turdetania, in aid of the praetores Publius Manlius and Appius Claudius, to the area where the Turdetani had their mines. Turdetani and Celtiberians, mercenaries in the service of the latter, were encamped in different locations. There were initially some skirmishes between Romans and Turdetani, always with a favorable outcome for the former. Cato's tribune emissaries were sent by Cato to convince the Celtiberians to withdraw to their lands without putting up a battle or to join the Roman army, charging double what was promised by the Turdetani. Faced with this proposition the Celtiberians asked for time to think, but, as the Turdetani joined the meeting, no agreement was reached. The Celtiberians, however, decided for their part not to present battle. After losing Celtiberian military support, the Turdetani were defeated. This defeat meant the loss of their mining possessions, which forced the Turdetani to remain in the Guadalquivir valley, devoting themselves to agriculture and cattle raising.

=== Passing through Celtiberia ===
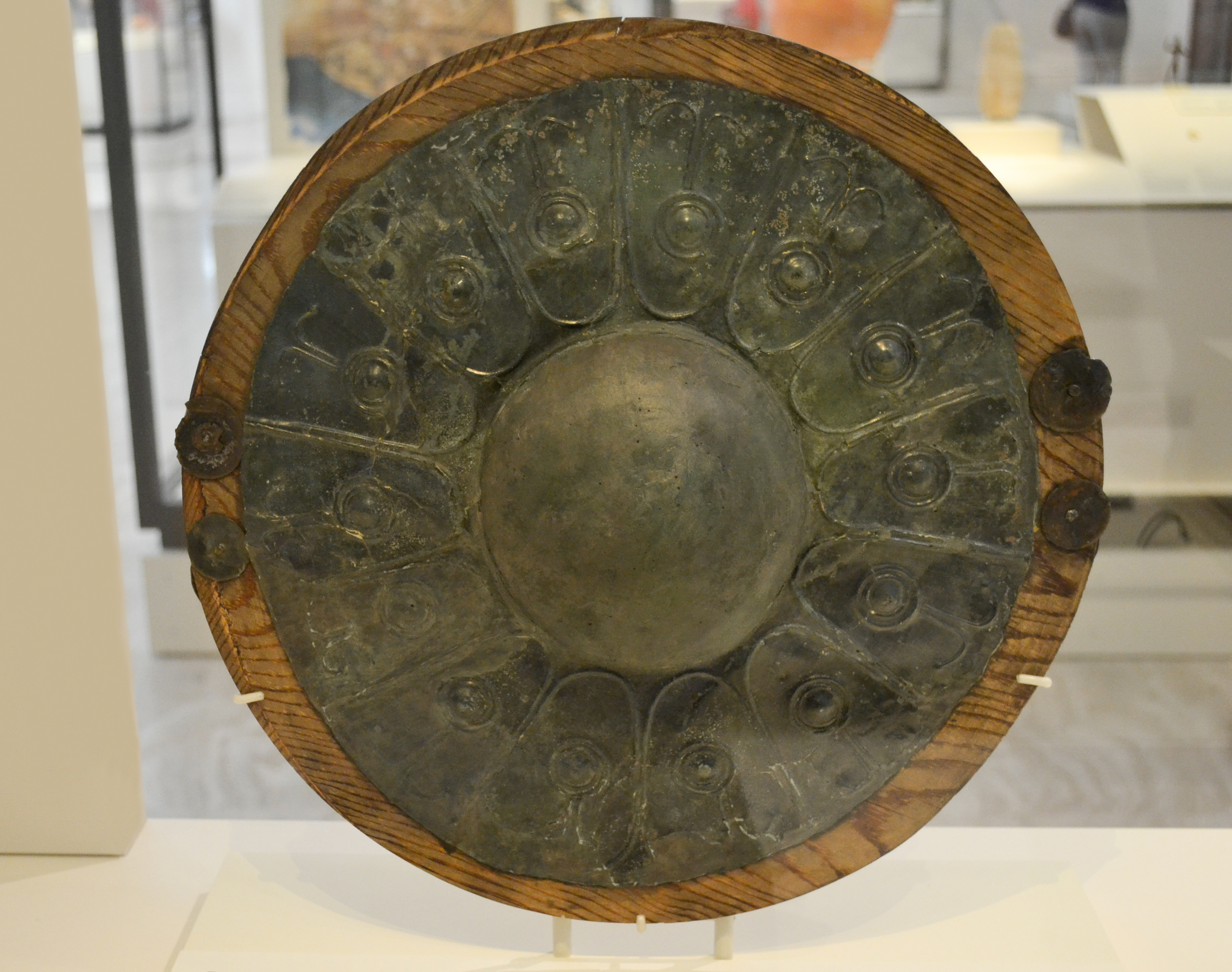
Large central stud of a circular Celtiberian shield, in the National Archaeological Museum, in Madrid. Made of bronze. Type: Quesada IA. From the necropolis of El Cuarto, in Griegos (province of Teruel, Aragon, Spain). Iron Age. II. Celtiberian (centuries 5th – 4th BC)

Cato the Elder returned north across Celtiberia to intimidate the Celtiberians and prevent future uprisings, and in retaliation for having joined the uprising of the Turdetani. He headed towards Segontia, as rumor had reached him that it was the square where greater booty could be obtained, and besieged the city without success due to lack of time. He then headed towards Numantia, in the vicinity of which he addressed a speech to his equites.

He subsequently returned to the province Citerior, leaving part of his army with the praetores after having paid his salary to the soldiers, (Note: Everything indicates that in addition to this "regular" salary, the soldiers also received part of the final booty. —Titus Livius (XXXIV, 46, 2)) and taking with him seven cohorts.

Returning from Turdetania Cato achieved the subjugation of ausetani, suessetani and sedetani. The consul was able to take advantage of the unease of his allies with the Lacetani, who had taken advantage of the Roman expedition to Turdetania to raid their villages. When the Roman contingent reached the city of the Lacetani, Cato sent part of his cohorts (Note: Plutarch notes that Cato employed five cohorts and 500 horsemen for this operation. He also indicates that 600 Roman deserters who had joined the Lacetani were immediately executed. —Plutarch (Cat. Mai. 11, 2)) to stand on one side and the others to stand on the opposite side. Thereupon he ordered the allies, Suessetani for the most part, to attack the wall. The Lacetani, confident that they could easily defeat the Suessetani, opened a gate and went out to meet them; the Suessetani fled and the enemies pursued them. Then the consul ordered the cohorts to enter the town immediately, who surprised the Lacetani. After this the Lacetani surrendered.

== Third uprising of the Bergistani ==
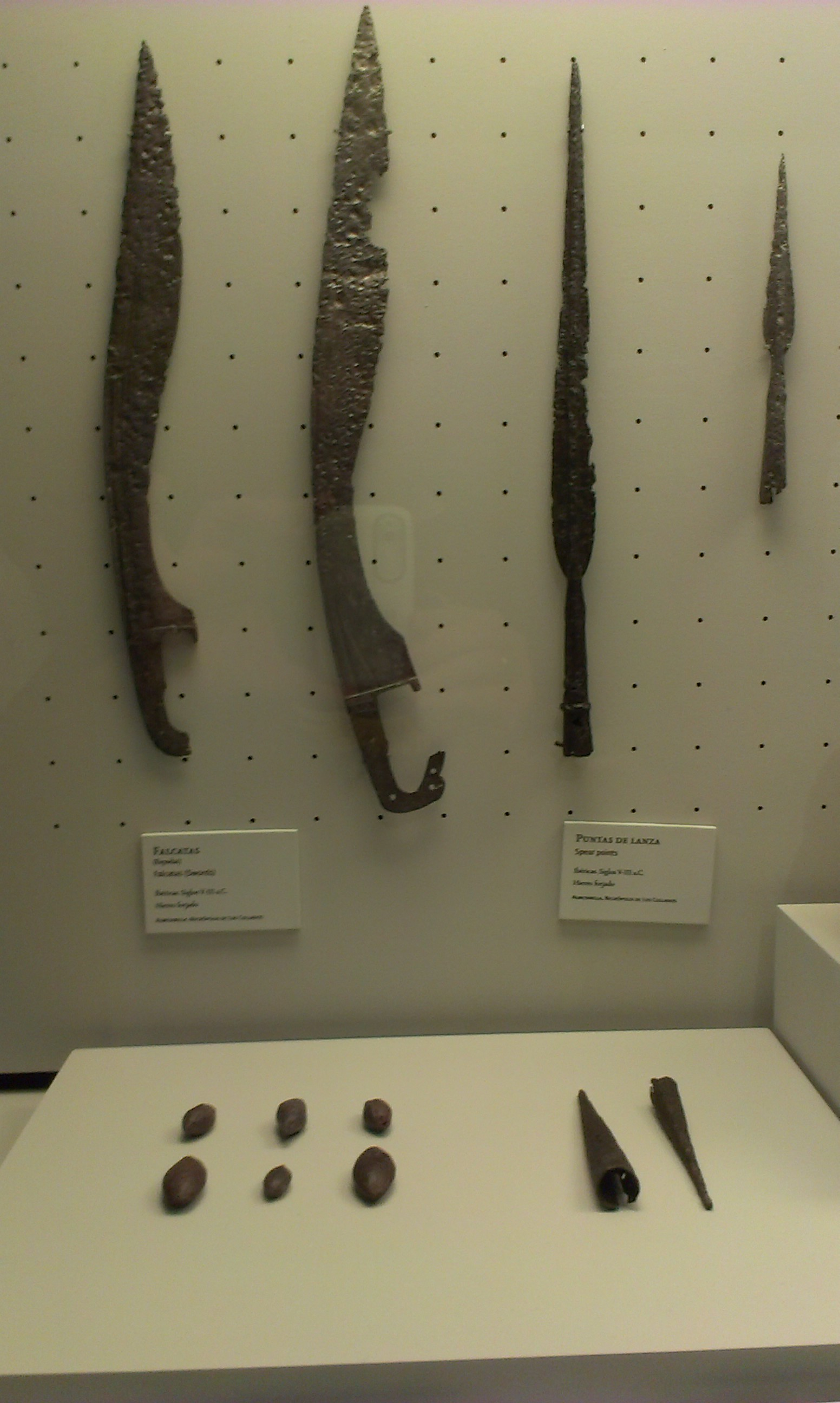
Falcatas, spearheads and slingshot glandes from the province of Córdoba, typical Iberian weapons

Subsequently the consul Marcus Porcius Cato headed back towards the Citerior province, towards the territory of the Bergistani, who had rebelled again and were resisting in the fortress of castrum Bergium. (Note: The site of the main castle, castrum Bergium, may correspond to the present-day town of Berga, although there is also a Berge in Lower Aragon. —Gran Enciclopedia (2004, p. 1897)) Upon arriving in the city the Bergistani leader went to Cato to tell him that he and his people were still loyal to Rome, and that it was outsiders who had taken control of the city and were hostile to the Romans, and that they were also engaged in plundering the inhabitants of the province Citerior. In this way, Cato devises a strategy to test whether or not the Bergistani were loyal to him, and in the process conquer the square more easily. Cato then ordered the Bergistani leader that he and his loyalists should occupy the citadel when the Roman siege began, an order which the Bergistani carried out; the bandits were then surrounded and defeated. After the battle Cato ordered that the citizens who had been loyal to his plan be freed, the remaining Bergistani enslaved, and the foreign bandits executed.

== Consequences ==
=== Victory management ===
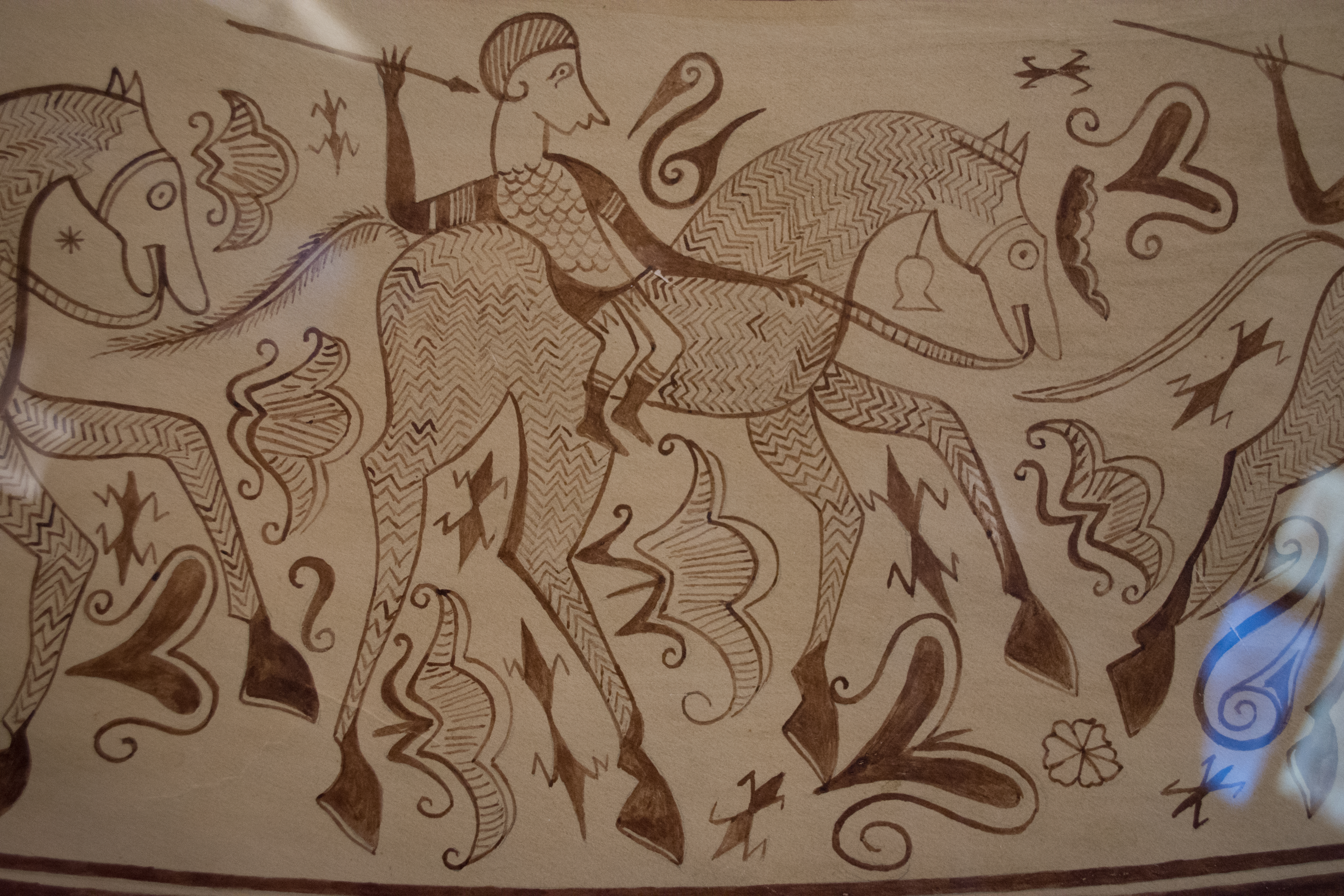
Iberian horseman in the Vase of the warriors. Prehistory Museum of Valencia

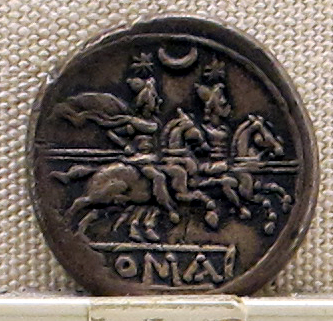
Denarius of the era.

Once he had reduced the Hispanic insurgents settled in the territory located between the Iberus River and the Pyrenees, Cato the Elder turned his attention to the administration of the province. During his rule revenues increased, as the state's profits from the exploitation of mining resources increased, mainly silver and iron, as well as of a large mount of salt in which the consul took an interest. It seems that Cato was able to see the reasons that had motivated the revolt, surely the excessive taxes on the Hispanians; so he reorganized the collection, increasing the profit that remained in Hispania.

While Cato was still in Hispania, the new consul who was to succeed him and the successors of the praetores were elected in Rome. He was again elected consul Scipio Africanus, Cato's rival, and praetors Publius Cornelius Scipio Nasica for the province Ulterior and Sextus Digitius for Citerior. Scipio's intention was to be posted to Hispania, but the senate decided that the new consul's destination should be Italy since the Hispanic provinces had been pacified.

Because of Cato's successes in Hispania, the senate approved three days of public prayers; and resolved also that the soldiers who had acted in Hispania during the revolt be discharged.

In late 194 BC, Marcus Porcius Cato returned to Rome with a huge war trophies consisting of 25 000 pounds and 123 000 pieces in bigati of silver, 540 pieces of silver from Uesca and 1400 pounds of gold; all taken from the Hispanic peoples in their military actions. (Note: A portion of this treasure is that known as argentum oscense. —Martínez Gázquez (1992, p. 171)) (Note: The Senate granted him to celebrate a triumphus. —Plutarch (Cat. Mai. 4, 3)) which is documented in the Fasti Triumphales. Cato distributed part of the booty among the soldiers who had served under him.

The victory in the war of Hispania was a great boost to the career of Marcus Porcius Cato, as it allowed him to reach the military heights of his opponents. This success meant, in particular, that he was able to rub shoulders with his great rival Scipio Africanus.

Upon the return of Cato the Elder to Rome and the arrival of the new praetors who succeeded him in the Hispanic provinces, another rebellion occurred again. The praetor Sextus Digitius clashed on many occasions with the revolters, losing in the fighting up to half of his troops.

=== Continuation of the process of conquest ===
==== Celtiberia ====
The pre-Roman peoples of Hispania around 200 BC (Note: The concrete situation and extent of the different groups of pre-Roman peoples of this period is approximate, as detailed studies in this field have not yet been carried out. —Martínez Gázquez (1992, p. 155))

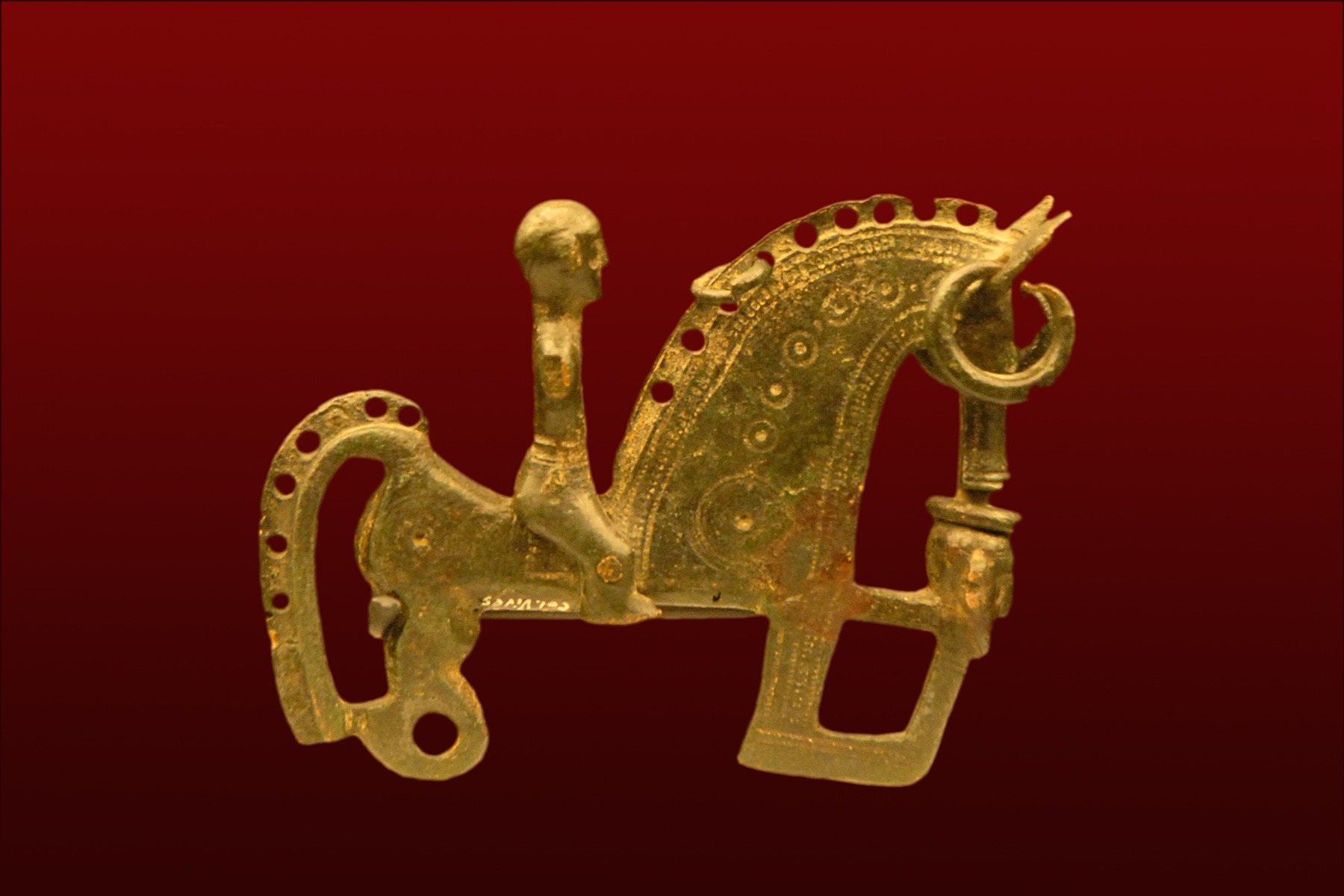
Bronze celtiberian fibula depicting a horseman. Under the horse's head is a severed human head, perhaps of a defeated enemy. This type of fibulae is considered an emblem of the warrior elites. centuries 3rd – 2nd BC. MAN

In Hispania, the process of conquest continued after the actions of Cato; thus, the proconsul Marcus Fulvius Nobilior subsequently fought other rebellions. Then Rome began the conquest of Lusitania, with two outstanding victories: in 189 BC that obtained by the proconsul Lucius Aemilius Paullus Macedonicus, and in 185 BC. that obtained by the praetor or proconsul Gaius Calpurnius Pisonus.

The conquest of Celtiberia was initiated in 181 BC by Quintus Fulvius Flaccus, who managed to defeat the Celtiberians and subdue some territories, obtaining for it the honor of an ovation in 191 BC. However, most of the conquest and pacification operations were carried out by praetor Tiberius Sempronius Gracchus from 179 BC to 178 BC. Sempronius took some thirty cities and villages, using various types of strategies, sometimes making pacts and sometimes stirring up rivalry between Celtiberians (Note: The fighting arts and equipment of the Celtiberians were well described by Diodorus Siculus (1st century BC), who showed his admiration for their bravery and skill. He also described their weapons, as well as their method of making steel, which he described as "excellent". —Diodoro Sículo (V, 33)) and Vascones, and founded over the already existing city of Ilurcis the new city of Gracchurris.

==== Lusitania ====
Subsequently problems would come from Lusitania, where from 155 BC. Punicus conducted major campaigns in territory controlled by the Republic, plundering territories in Baetica and reached the Mediterranean Sea coast, with the Vettones as allies. He achieved great victories such as the one against the Roman praetors Marcus Manlius and Lucius Calpurnius Piso Caesoninus.

From 147 BC the republic should face a new Lusitanian enemy, the initially shepherd Viriathus, who would become from then on a great headache for Rome, so much so that he came to be called the terror of Rome. He managed to flee the slaughter of Servius Sulpicius Galba in 151 BC, and subsequently rebelled, achieving several victories against the Romans. He also conquered several cities, such as Tucci (probably present-day Martos or Tejada la Vieja), and the region of Bastetania. He was killed around 139 BC.

== The sources ==
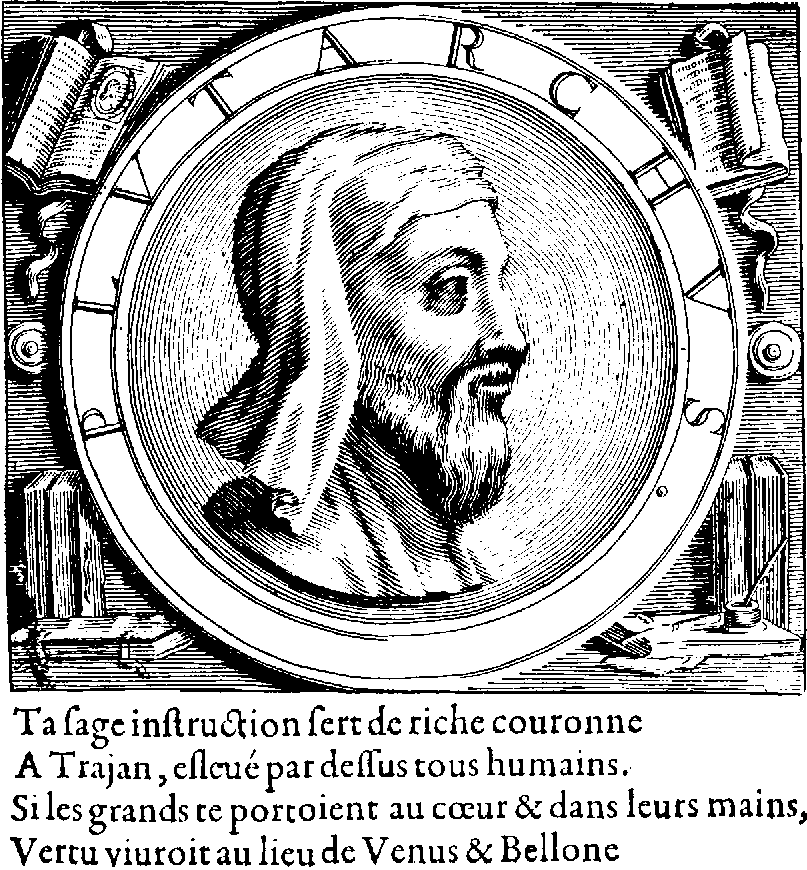
Parallel Lives, by Plutarch. Translation by Amyot, 1565

The treatment of the conflict has been greater and more exhaustive than that of other similar campaigns in Hispania. Surely the character of Cato the Elder and his works were the cause, since they aroused great interest in later authors. Among these it is worth mentioning Plutarch and Appian, but above all Titus Livius, who was who treated with greater length and depth the account of the events. No author has collected the campaign in its entirety.

=== Cato ===
In his writings, Cato knew how to give importance to his successes, especially helped by the achievement of the triumphus, which redounded even more in the compliments he addressed to himself. Moreover, this was the only episode in his career in which he had supreme command in a conflict. It is therefore logical that Cato would boast of this success in the defense of his consulship, to defend himself from the criticism of his adversaries. The entire account of the campaign would have been included in his later work the Origines, probably in the fifth book, of which some fragments have been preserved.

=== Plutarch ===
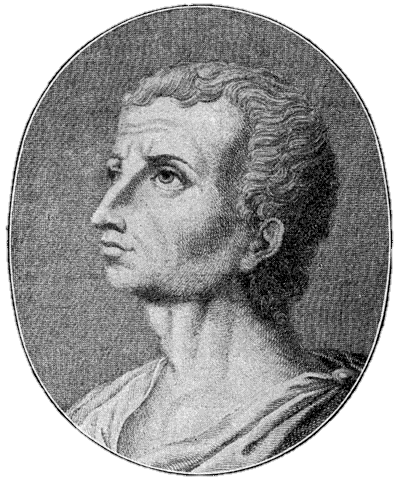
Titus Livius, author of Ab Urbe condita libri

The biography of Cato the Elder written by Plutarch (Parallel Lives, Cato Maior) is the most detailed and the most influential in terms of knowledge of the character of those ever written. Its source is Cato himself, as Plutarch himself indicates on several occasions. He also relies on Polybius, a source likewise of Cornelius Nepos, from whom Plutarch himself obtained information. Plutarch's work, moreover, gathers information from various authors and thus makes it possible to obtain an overall view of the character.

=== Appian ===
Appian deals with the narrative of the campaign in his work Iberia, specifically between chapters 39 and 41. In this sense it seems that in the case at hand Appian employed the most reliable ones. In large part he relies directly on Cato himself to narrate the events, while in others he relies on Livius. In chapter 41, news about the destruction of the walls, it seems that Appian retouches Livius' version or picks up that manipulation from a later author.

=== Titus Livius ===
Titus Livius' treatment of the campaign is the most extensive and exhaustive of those preserved, and is the one that serves as the main reference for setting up the story; it should be noted in this regard that several episodes of the contest are contained only in his work, such as the description of Emporion. Livius treats the character of Cato the Elder differently from the rest of the work and with a great profusion of detail. The account of the events is found in books XXXIII and XXXIV of his work Ab Urbe condita libri. Livius' main source for the narrative of the feud is Cato himself, while for matters of a more general nature he relied on the official chronicle of the actions of the senate. Livius is, in turn, the main source for other later authors, such as Frontinus.

== See also ==
- Portal:Ancient Rome
- Campaign history of the Roman military
- Structural history of the Roman military
- Kingdom of Iberia
- Roman Republic
- Carthaginian Iberia

== Bibliography ==
=== Classical sources ===
- Appian (1968). Appiani historia Romana, vol. I. Addenda et corrig. adiecit. E. Gabba. Leipzig: P. Viereck et A. G. Roos.
- Aulo Gelio (1968). A. Gellii noctes Atticae. Recognouit breuique adnotatione critica instruixit. Oxford: P. K. Marshall.
- Diodoro Sículo. Bibliotheca Historica. Translated by J.J. Torres. revision by J. Espasa. Madrid: Editorial Gredos. ISBN 978-84-249-2292-4.
- Rufo Festo (1965). Sexti Pompei Festi de uerborum significatu quae supersunt cum Pauli epitome. Leipzig: W. M. Lindsay (1913).
- Frontinus (1888). Iuli Frontini strategematon libri quattuor. Leipzig: G. Gundermann.
- Frontón (1954). M. C. Frontonis epistulae quas edidit. Leyden: M. P. J. Van den Hout.
- Nepote (1904). C. Nepotis vitae. Recognouit breuique adnotatione critica instruixit. Oxford: E. O. Winstedt.
- Plinio (1967). C. Plini Secundi naturalis historiae libri XXXVII. Leipzig: C. Mayhoff, (1897–1909).
- Plutarch. Parallel Lives (Lives of the Noble Greeks and Romans).
  - W. Nachstädt; W. Sieveking; J. B. Titchener (1971). Plutarchi moralia. Vol. II, Regnum et imperatorum apophthegmata. Recensuerunt et emendauerunt. (1932–1934). Leipzig.
  - K. Ziegler (1969). Plutarchi vitae parallelae. Vol. I, 1. Aristides et Cato Maior. Quartum recensuit. Leipzig.
- Polibio (March 1982). Historia universal bajo la República romana. Vol II. Translated by Juan Díaz Casamada. Barcelona: Editorial Iberia, S.A. ISBN 978-84-7082-100-4.
- Titus Livius. Ab Urbe condita libri.
  - "Volumen IV: Libros XXI-XXV". Historia de Roma desde su fundación. Madrid: Editorial Gredos. 1993. ISBN 978-84-249-1608-4.
  - "Volumen V: Libros XXVI-XXX". Historia de Roma desde su fundación. Madrid: Editorial Gredos. 1993. ISBN 978-84-249-1609-1.
  - "Volumen VI: Libros XXXI-XXXV". Historia de Roma desde su fundación. Translated by J.A. Villar Vidal. Madrid: Editorial Gredos. 1993. ISBN 978-84-249-1620-6. Revision by J. Solís
  - "Volumen VII: Libros XXVI-LX". Historia de Roma desde su fundación. Madrid: Editorial Gredos. 1993. ISBN 978-84-249-1629-9.
  - "Volumen VIII: Libros XLI-XLV". Historia de Roma desde su fundación. Madrid: Editorial Gredos. 1994. ISBN 978-84-249-1643-5.
- Zonaras. Ioannis Zonarae epitome historiarum. 1868-1874. Leipzig: L. Lindorf.

=== Modern works ===
- Amílcar Guerra, Carlos Fabião (1992). Viriato: Genealogia de um Mito (PDF) (in Portuguese). Penélope: revista de história e ciências sociais. ISSN 0871-7486.
- Amílcar Guerra, Carlos Fabião (2010). A propósito de los conceptos "Lusitano" y "Lusitania" (PDF) (in Portuguese). Serta Palaeohispanica in honorem Javier de Hoz. ISSN 1578-5386.
- Arrayás Morales, Isaías (2005). Morfología histórica del territorio de Tarraco (ss. III- .C.) (1st ed.). Publicacions i Edicions UB. ISBN 8447530078.
- Astin, A. E. (1978). Cato the Censor. Oxford: Clarendon Press.
- Bázquez Martínez, José María (2006). Roma y la explotación económica de la Península Ibérica.
- Bonner, Stanley F. (1984). La educación en la antigua Roma: desde Catón el Viejo a Plinio el joven. Barcelona: Herder.
- Brennan, Corey Loog (2000). The praetorship in the Roman Republic Vol.I (1st ed.). Oxford University Press. ISBN 0-19-511459-0.
- Cadiou, François; Hourcade, David (2003). Defensa y territorio en Hispania de los Escipiones a Augusto. Casa de Velázquez. ISBN 9788497730976.
- Chassignet, M. (1986). Caton: Les Origines. Fragments. Paris: Colección Budé, Les Belles Lettres.
- Chic García, Genaro (1980). Consideraciones sobre las incursiones lusitanas en Andalucía (PDF). Gades. pp. 15–26. ISSN 0210-6116. Archived from the original (PDF) on December 20, 2013.
- Corti, Eugenio (2008). Catón el Viejo. Ediciones Sígueme. ISBN 978-84-301-1678-2.
- Dalby, Andrew (1998). Cato: On Farming. Totnes: Prospect Books. ISBN 0907325807.
- Della Corte, F. (1969). F. Della Corte. Catone Censore. La vita e la fortuna. Firenze.
- Gabba, E. (1967). Appiani Bellorum Civilium liber primus. A cura di. Firenze.
- García Alonso, Francisco (2003). Roma, Cartago, Iberos y Celtíberos. Las grandes guerras en la península Ibérica. Barcelona: Ariel. ISBN 84-344-5206-5.
- Götzfried, K. (1907). Annalen der römischen Provinzen beider Spanien. Erlangen.
- Grant, Michael (1987). Historia de Roma.
- Gran Enciclopedia (2004). La Gran Enciclopèdia en català, vol.03 (in Catalan). Barcelona: Edicions62.
- Hernàndez Cardona, Francesc Xavier (2001). Història militar de Catalunya, vol. I, dels íbers als carolingis (in Catalan) (1st ed.). ISBN 84-232-0639-4.
- Jordan, M. (1860). M. Catonis praeter librum de re rustica quae exstant. M. Jordan (1860), 1967.
- Quesada Sanz, Fernando (2001). Gladius, XXI.
- Malcovati, H. (1955). Oratorum romanorum fragmenta liberae rei publicae. Turin: Paravia.
- Maluquer de Motes i Nicolau, Joan (1965). La ciutat grega mes antiga de Catalunya (in Catalan).
- Maluquer de Motes i Nicolau, Joan (1968). Epigrafía prelatina de la Península Ibérica. Barcelona.
- Martínez Gázquez, José (1992). La campaña de Catón en Hispania. Barcelona: Universidad de Barcelona. Publicaciones y Ediciones. ISBN 84-7875-980-8.
- Mira Guardiola, Miguel Ángel (2000). Cartago contra Roma: las Guerras Púnicas. Madrid: Aldebarán. ISBN 84-88676-89-1.
- Montenegro, A. y otros (1986). "Chapter 2". Historia de España, Hispania Romana. Madrid: Ed. Gredos.
- Moure Romanillo, A. y otros (1991). "Historia 16". Manual de Historia de España, 1. Prehistoria. Hª Antigua. ISBN 84-7679-193-3.
- Münzer, Friedrich (1923). Paulys Realencyclopädie der classischen Altertumswissenschaft (in German). Stuttgart.
- Nolla, Josep M. (1984). la campanya de m. p. cató a empúries el 195 a.c. Algunes consideracions. Revista Girona.
- Pastor Muñoz, Mauricio (2004). Viriato: El héroe hispano que luchó por la libertad de su pueblo. La Esfera de los Libros. ISBN 9788497341783.
- Pastor Muñoz, Mauricio (2009). Viriato en el ámbito ursonense (PDF). Cuadernos de los Amigos de los Museos de Osuna. ISSN 1697-1019.
- Pitillas Salañer, Eduardo (1996). Una aproximación a las reacciones indígenas frente al expansionismo romano en Hispania (205- al 133 a.n.e.) (PDF). Memorias de historia antigua. ISSN 0210-2943.
- Ramon i Arrufat, Antoni (1982). Història, vol. IX: llibres XVIII-XXI Per Polibi (in Catalan). Fundació Bernat Metge.
- Rodríguez González, Julio (2010). La resistencia hispana contra Roma. Madrid: Almena. ISBN 978-84-92714-14-8.
- Rodríguez Martínez, Felipe (2005). Misterios de las religiones: Catón el Viejo, el defensor de Roma. Clarendon Press.
- Rovira i Virgili, Antoni (1920). Història Nacional de Catalunya, volum I (in Catalan). Edicions Pàtria.
- Salinas de Frías, Manuel (2008). La jefatura de Viriato y las sociedades del occidente de la península ibérica (PDF). Palaeohispanica. pp. 89–120. ISSN 1578-5386.
- Santosuosso, Antonio (2001). Storming the Heavens: Soldiers, Emperors and Civilians in the Roman Empire. Westview Press. ISBN 0-8133-3523-X.
- Schwartz, E. Appianus aus Alexandrien, RE, II.
- Smith, William (1854). "GRACCURRIS". Dictionary of Greek and Roman Geography. Boston: LLD, Ed.
- Smith, William (1867). "Valerius Antias". Dictionary of Greek and Roman Biography and Mythology. Boston: Little, Brown and Company. Archived from the original on December 17, 2005.
- Vidal, Gerardo (2002–2003). Catón el viejo y la primera asimilación romana de la cultura griega.
- Villar, Francisco; Fernández Álvarez, María Pilar (2001). Religión, lengua y cultura prerromanas de Hispania: coloquio sobre lenguas y culturas prerromanas de la península. Universidad de Salamanca. ISBN 9788478008933.
- Wagener, A. (1899). M. Porcii Catonis Originum Fragmenta emendata disposita illustrata. Bonn.
