= Manilia gens =

Ancient Roman family

The gens Manilia was a plebeian family at ancient Rome. Members of this gens are frequently confused with the Manlii, Mallii, and Mamilii. Several of the Manilii were distinguished in the service of the Republic, with Manius Manilius obtaining the consulship in 149 BC; but the family itself remained small and relatively unimportant.

== Origin ==
The nomen Manilius seems to be derived from the praenomen Manius, and so probably shares a common root with the nomen of the Manlii. This being the case, the Manilii were almost certainly of Latin origin.

== Branches and cognomina ==
The Manilii were never divided into distinct families, and the only surname found under the Republic is Mancinus, although this probably belonged to one of the Manlii, who has been erroneously named as a Manilius in some manuscripts. A few cognomina are found in Imperial times.

== Members ==
This list includes abbreviated praenomina. For an explanation of this practice, see filiation.

- Sextus Manilius, one of the leaders of the soldiers who led the second secession of the plebs in 449 BC, together with Marcus Oppius, after the death of Verginia. Dionysius gives his name as Manlius.
- Publius Manilius, grandfather of the consul and jurist Manius Manilius.
- Manilius, praetor in 182 BC, was assigned the province of Hispania Citerior, where he restored discipline among the soldiers. He was expelled from the senate by Cato the Censor, but subsequently restored. He is probably identical with Publius Manlius.
- Publius Manilius, one of the legates sent to assist the propraetor Lucius Anicius Gallus settle the affairs of Illyricum in 167 BC.
- Manius Manilius P. f. P. n., (Note: Or Marcus in some manuscripts of Cicero, according to Mai.) consul in 149 BC, during the Third Punic War. He and his colleague, Lucius Marcius Censorinus, led the attack on Carthage, burning the Carthaginian fleet within sight of the city. But it was as a jurist that Manilius earned his reputation; Sextus Pomponius calls him one of the founders of the civil law, and Cicero describes him as a skilled orator.
- Manilius, or perhaps Manlius, praetor in 137 BC, was sent to quell a slave revolt in Sicily, but was defeated by Eunus, the leader of the rebellion.
- Publius Manilius P. f. (M'. n.), (Note: Münzer suggests that he was the nephew of the consul Manius, and that his filiation should be P. f. P. n.; Degrassi supposes him to be a grandson of Manius. Badian suggests that he was the son of Manius, or perhaps a nephew of the legate of 167 BC.) consul in 120 BC.
- Manilius Mancinus, tribune of the plebs in 108 BC, proposed the law granting Gaius Marius, the consul-elect, the province of Numidia and the command against Jugurtha. He may have been a Manlius rather than a Manilius; Broughton gives his name as Titus Manlius Mancinus.
- Lucius Manilius, praetor in 79 BC, the following year received proconsular authority over the province of Gallia Narbonensis. He crossed into Hispania to assist the proconsul Metellus in the war with Sertorius, with three legions and fifteen hundred cavalry. He was decisively beaten by Lucius Hirtuleius, losing his entire army, and escaping into the town of Ilerda.
- Gaius Manilius, tribune of the plebs in 66 BC, who passed the Lex Manilia granting Gnaeus Pompeius special powers to fight Mithridates VI. Manilius' enemies brought him to trial on an uncertain charge; perhaps extortion, or disturbing another trial. He was defended by Cicero, but to no avail, and was condemned.
- Quintus Manilius, tribune of the plebs in 52 BC.
- Marcus Manilius, the author of an astrological poem entitled Astronomica.
- Manilius, the author of an epigram quoted by Varro. He may be identical with the author of Astronomica.
- Quintus Manlius Ancharius Tarquitius Saturninus, consul in 62 and later proconsul of Africa
- Publius Manilius Vopiscus Vicinillianus, consul in AD 114.

== See also ==
- List of Roman gentes

== Bibliography ==
- Marcus Tullius Cicero, De Oratore, Brutus, Pro Lege Manilia.
- Quintus Tullius Cicero, De Petitione Consulatus (attributed).
- Gaius Sallustius Crispus (Sallust), Bellum Jugurthinum (The Jugurthine War).
- Marcus Terentius Varro, De Lingua Latina (On the Latin Language).
- Titus Livius (Livy), Ab Urbe Condita (History of Rome).
- Dionysius of Halicarnassus, Romaike Archaiologia.
- Quintus Asconius Pedianus, Commentarius in Oratio Ciceronis In Cornelio (Commentary on Cicero's Oration In Cornelio); Commentarius in Oratio Ciceronis Pro Milone (Commentary on Cicero's Oration Pro Milone).
- Plutarchus, Lives of the Noble Greeks and Romans.
- Lucius Annaeus Florus, Epitome de T. Livio Bellorum Omnium Annorum DCC (Epitome of Livy: All the Wars of Seven Hundred Years).
- Appianus Alexandrinus (Appian), Punica (The Punic Wars); Bella Mithridatica (The Mithridatic Wars).
- Aulus Gellius, Noctes Atticae (Attic Nights).
- Lucius Cassius Dio Cocceianus (Cassius Dio), Roman History.
- Paulus Orosius, Historiarum Adversum Paganos (History Against the Pagans).
- Flavius Magnus Aurelius Cassiodorus Senator, Chronica.
- Digesta seu Pandectae (The Digest).
- Pieter Burmann, Latin Anthology, Johann Christian Wernsdorf, ed. (1759–1778).
- Dictionary of Greek and Roman Biography and Mythology, William Smith, ed., Little, Brown and Company, Boston (1849).
- George Davis Chase, "The Origin of Roman Praenomina", in Harvard Studies in Classical Philology, vol. VIII (1897).
- T. Robert S. Broughton, The Magistrates of the Roman Republic, American Philological Association (1952).
- Ernst Badian, "The Consuls, 179-49 BC", in Chiron, 20 (1990), p. 378.
