= Publius Porcius Laeca =

Publius Porcius Laeca was the name of several Romans in the Republican era, including:

- Publius Porcius Laeca (tribune 199 BC) (2nd-century BC), tribune of the plebs.
- Publius Porcius Laeca (monetalis) (2nd-century BC), in 110–109 BC, was a moneyer (monetalis).
