= Battle of Turda (196 BC) =

197 BC battle of the Iberian revolt against the Romans

- Part of Roman conquest of the Iberian Peninsula; Iberian revolt (197-195 BC)
- Hispania around the year 197 BC.
Date	196 BC
Location	Turda, Hispania
Result	Roman victory

Belligerents
Roman Republic	Hispanic rebels

Commanders and leaders
Quintus Minucius Thermus	Budar; Besadinus (POW)

Strength
4000 infantrymen 300 cavalry	

Casualties and losses
	12000 casualties.

The Battle of Turda was one of the battles of the 197-195 BC rebellion by the Iberian peoples against Roman domination in the 2nd century BC.

== Background ==
The victory of the Roman Republic over Carthage in the Second Punic War left Hispania in Roman hands. The territory's transformation into two provinces resulted in significant administrative and fiscal changes including the imposition of the stipendium, which were rejected by the local tribes—who still had a certain political structure and capacity for reaction. In 197 BC, a revolt broke out across the conquered territory of Hispania, shortly after the Second Macedonian War, due to the Republican plundering.

== The battle ==
Many local leaders revolted in Hispania Ulterior, and the Republic sent Gaius Sempronius Tuditanus to Hispania Citerior and Marcus Helvius Blasion to Hispania Ulterior with a total of 8,000 infantrymen and 800 cavalrymen to demobilize the veterans, and the order to demarcate the provincial borders. Gaius Sempronius Tuditanus died of battle wounds in late 197 BC, and the province was left without a praetor until the following year.

Quintus Minucius Thermus and Quintus Fabius Butaeo became praetors in 196 BC and were assigned to command Hispania Citerior and Hispania Ulterior, respectively. They were provided with reinforcements consisting of two legions, 4,000 infantrymen, and 300 cavalrymen. In 196 BC, Quintus Minucius Thermus defeated the rebels Budar and Besadinus at an unspecified location called Turda, taking general Besadinus as a prisoner. Quintus Minucius was honored with a triumphus upon his return to Rome in 195 BC.
