= Manius (praenomen) =

Latin personal name

Manius (/ˈmæniəs/ MAN-ee-əs, Latin: [ˈmaːnɪ.ʊs]), feminine Mania, is a Latin praenomen, or personal name, which was used throughout the period of the Roman Republic, and well into imperial times. The name was used by both patrician and plebeian families, and gave rise to the patronymic gentes Manlia and Manilia. Manius was originally abbreviated with an archaic five-stroke M (in Unicode U+A7FF ꟿ LATIN EPIGRAPHIC LETTER ARCHAIC M), which was not otherwise used in Latin. In place of this letter, the praenomen came to be abbreviated M'.

Although regularly used by certain gentes, such as the Acilii, Aemilii, Aquilii, Papirii, Sergii, and Valerii, Manius was not used by the majority of families, and was never particularly common. Between ten and twelve other praenomina were used more frequently. It became less common during the period of the Roman Empire, eventually falling out of use.

== Origin and meaning of the name ==
The Roman scholar Sextus Pompeius Festus believed that Manius was derived from mane, "the morning", and therefore was originally given to children born in the morning. It has also been proposed that the name may have been given to children born in the month of Februarius, the month sacred to the manes, the souls of the dead. However, Chase proposes that it instead derives from the archaic adjective manus, meaning "good". The name's superficial similarity to manes may have been one reason why Manius was relatively uncommon.
