= Manlia gens =

Roman family

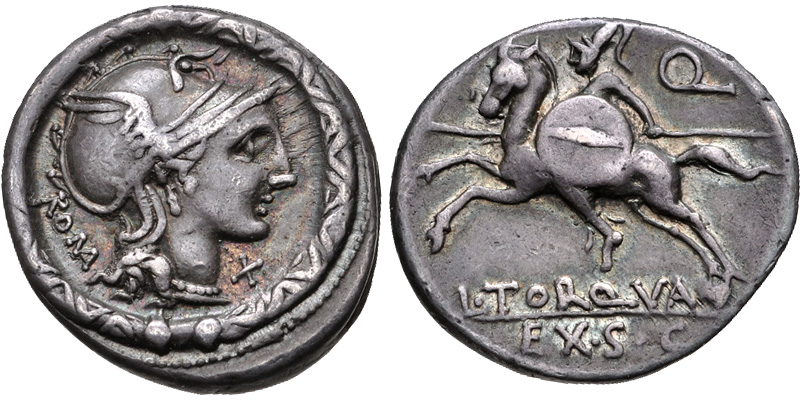
Denarius of Lucius Manlius Torquatus, 113–112 BC. The obverse depicts the head of Roma within a torque, the emblem of the Manlii Torquati. The reverse depicts a warrior charging into battle on horseback, beneath the letter 'Q', signifying Torquatus' quaestorship.

The gens Manlia (Mānlia) was one of the oldest and noblest patrician houses at Rome, from the earliest days of the Republic until imperial times. The first of the gens to obtain the consulship was Gnaeus Manlius Cincinnatus, consul in 480 BC, and for nearly five centuries its members frequently held the most important magistracies. Many of them were distinguished statesmen and generals, and a number of prominent individuals under the Empire claimed the illustrious Manlii among their ancestors.

== Origin ==
The Manlii were said to hail from the ancient Latin city of Tusculum. The nomen Manlia may be a patronymic surname, based on the praenomen Manius, presumably the name of an ancestor of the gens. The gens Manilia was derived from the same name, and its members are frequently confused with the Manlii, as are the Mallii. However, Manius was not used by any of the Manlii in historical times. The Manlii were probably numbered amongst the gentes maiores, the greatest of the patrician families. As with many patrician gentes, the Manlii seem to have acquired plebeian branches as well, and one of the family was tribune of the plebs in the time of Cicero. The plebeian Manlii were probably descended from freedmen of the patricians, from members who had gone over to the plebeians, or from unrelated persons who acquired the nomen after obtaining the franchise from one of the Manlii.

== Praenomina ==
The Manlii used the praenomina Publius, Gnaeus, Aulus, Lucius, and Marcus. The Manlii Torquati also favored the name Titus, using primarily that, Aulus, and Lucius.

A well-known story relates that after Marcus Manlius Capitolinus was condemned for treason, the Roman Senate decreed that henceforth none of the gens should bear the praenomen Marcus. However, this legend may have originated as a way to explain the scarcity of the name amongst the Manlii, as the name was rarely used in later generations.

== Branches and cognomina ==
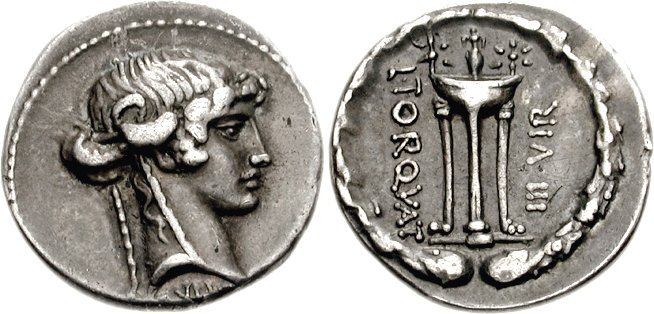
Denarius of Lucius Manlius Torquatus, 65 BC. The obverse depicts the head of the Sibyl, while a tripod and amphora, instruments of the quindecimviri sacris faciundis, appear within a torque on the reverse.

The earliest cognomen found amongst the Manlii is Cincinnatus, better known from the Quinctia gens. This name originally referred to a person with fine, curly hair. The descendants of Gnaeus Manlius Cincinnatus bore the surname Vulso, meaning "plucked", perhaps chosen for its contrast to Cincinnatus. Münzer, noting that the cognomen Cincinnatus is missing from the older historians, supposed that it might be a mistake, and that Vulso was the original surname of the Manlian gens. The Manlii Vulsones flourished for over three hundred years.

The Manlii Capitolini were descended from the Vulsones, and first appear in the second half of the fifth century BC. The surname Capitolinus probably indicates that the family lived on the Capitoline Hill, although the role of Marcus Manlius in saving the Capitol from the Gauls during the sack of Rome in 390 BC is also credited with establishing the name in his family. The surname was relatively short-lived amongst the Manlii, being replaced by that of Torquatus. This surname was first acquired by Titus Manlius Imperiosus, who defeated a giant Gaul during a battle in 361 BC, and took his torque as a trophy, placing it around his own neck. The descendants of Torquatus remained prominent until the final decades of the Republic, and adopted the torque as an emblem upon their coins. Imperiosus, a cognomen borne by Torquatus and his father, was bestowed on account of their imperious manner. The Manlii Torquati were firmly aligned with the aristocratic party toward the end of the Republic, siding first with Sulla, then with Pompeius and the Liberatores. In later times, Torquatus was borne by the Junii Silani, who were descended from the Manlii.

The Manlii Acidini rose to prominence during the Second Punic War, but achieved only one consulship, in 179, before fading into relative obscurity. They still flourished in the time of Cicero, who praises their nobility.

From coins of the Manlii featuring the inscriptions SER and SERGIA, Münzer concluded that one stirps of this gens bore the cognomen Sergianus, indicating descent from the Sergia gens. However, this probably referred to the tribus Sergia; a plebeian branch of the Manlii used the name of their tribe to distinguish themselves from the patrician Manlii, a practice also found among the Memmii.

Towards the end of the Republic, several early Manlii appear without cognomina, such as Quintus and Gnaeus Manlius, tribunes of the plebs in 69 and 58 BC.

== Members ==
This list includes abbreviated praenomina. For an explanation of this practice, see filiation.

=== Manlii Cincinnati et Vulsones ===
- Publius Manlius, father of the consul Cincinnatus.
- Gnaeus Manlius P. f. Cincinnatus, consul in 480 BC, fought against the Etruscans, and was slain in battle.
- Gnaeus Manlius Cn. f. P. n. Vulso, (Note: Livy calls him Gaius, a name not otherwise used by the Manlii, but evidently a mistake for Gnaeus, given in the filiation of his grandson, Aulus Manlius Vulso Capitolinus, consular tribune in 405, 402, and 397. The two names were nearly always abbreviated, and frequently confounded. Diodorus calls him Marcus, and Dionysius Aulus. None of these explicitly identify the decemvir with the consul of 474, nor do Livy or Diodorus state that he had previously been consul, although Dionysius erroneously indicates that he had been consul the previous year. The chronological difficulty in identifying the decemvir with the consul of 474 arises from the decemvir's son serving as consular tribune three times from 405 to 397; unless he were the child of the decemvir's old age, he would have been rather elderly by the time he first achieved high office, if his father were consul nearly seventy years earlier.) consul in 474 BC, marched against Veii, who agreed to a forty-year truce, for which Manlius received an ovation. A number of scholars identify him with the decemvir of 451, but this seems doubtful on chronological grounds; he was probably the decemvir's father.
- Aulus Manlius Cn. f. P. n. Vulso, one of the ambassadors sent to research Greek laws in 454 BC, and subsequently one of the decemvirs elected in 451.
- Marcus Manlius Cn. f. Vulso, consular tribune in 420 BC.
- Publius Manlius M. f. Cn. n. Vulso, consular tribune in 400 BC.
- Gnaeus Manlius (Vulso), (Note: Called "Gaius" by Livy. His cognomen is uncertain; it could also be Capitolinus, or he may have borne both.) consular tribune in 379 BC.
- Lucius Manlius A. f. P. n. Vulso Longus, consul in 256 and 250 BC.
- Lucius Manlius L. f. A. n. Vulso, praetor peregrinus in 218 BC, was an unsuccessful candidate for the consulship in 216.
- Publius Manlius L. f. A. n. Vulso, praetor in BC 210, received Sardinia as his province. He minted coins during his magistracy.
- Gnaeus Manlius Cn. f. L. n. Vulso, curule aedile in 197 BC, praetor of Sicily in 195, and consul in 189 BC. As proconsul of Asia in 188–187, he negotiated the Treaty of Apamea with Antiochus III.
- Lucius Manlius Cn. f. L. n. Vulso, praetor in 197 BC, received Sicilia as his province. He was also legate to his brother Gnaeus, the consul of 189, during his campaign in Asia. In 188, he demanded from Antiochus III his oath to uphold the Treaty of Apamea.
- Publius Manlius Vulso, praetor in 195 BC, was later again praetor in 182 BC.
- Aulus Manlius Cn. f. L. n. Vulso, one of the triumvirs appointed to establish a colony in the territory of Thurii and Frentinum from 194 to 192 BC. He was praetor suffectus in 189, and consul in 178. He was assigned the province of Cisalpine Gaul, whence he attacked and conquered Istria.
- Lucius Manlius Vulso, ambassador in Bythinia 149 BC.

=== Manlii Capitolini ===
- Marcus Manlius P. f. Vulso Capitolinus, consul or consular tribune in 434 BC.
- Lucius Manlius Vulso Capitolinus, consular tribune in 422 BC.
- Aulus Manlius A. f. Cn. n. Vulso Capitolinus, consular tribune in 405, 402, and 397 BC.
- Titus Manlius A. f. Cn. n. Vulso Capitolinus, the father of Marcus, consul in 392 BC, and Aulus, four times consular tribune. He is only known from his sons' filiation.
- Quintus Manlius A. f. Cn. n. Vulso Capitolinus, consular tribune in 396 BC.
- Marcus Manlius T. f. A. n. Capitolinus, consul in 392 BC, the deliverer of the Capitol from the Gauls. He was also interrex in 387.
- Aulus Manlius T. f. A. n. Capitolinus, consular tribune in 389, 385, 383 and 370 BC.
- Titus Manlius T. f. A. n. Capitolinus, the brother of Marcus and Aulus Manlius Capitolinus.
- Publius Manlius A. f. A. n. Capitolinus, consular tribune in 379 and 367 BC. As dictator in 368, he nominated the first plebeian magister equitum, Gaius Licinius Calvus.
- Lucius Manlius A. f. A. n. Capitolinus Imperiosus, dictator in 363 BC, and father of Titus Manlius Imperiosus Torquatus. He was prosecuted in 362 by the tribune Marcus Pomponius for having stayed in power for more than six months, and for his cruelty toward some citizens and his own son, the future Torquatus, who nonetheless forced Pomponius to drop the charges against his father.
- Gnaeus Manlius L. f. A. n. Capitolinus Imperiosus, consul in 359 and 357 BC, and Interrex in 355.

=== Manlii Torquati ===
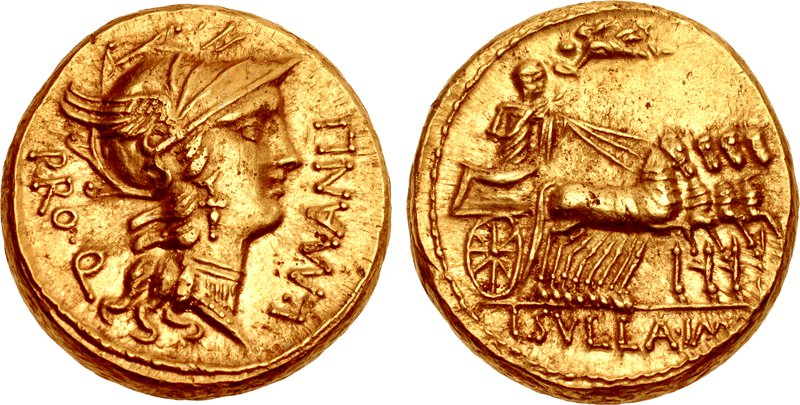
Aureus of Lucius Manlius Torquatus with Sulla, 82 BC. The obverse depicts a head of Roma, while on the reverse a victorious general triumphs in a quadriga, crowned by Victoria, alluding to Sulla's campaign against the younger Marius and Papirius Carbo.

- Titus Manlius L. f. A. n. Imperiosus Torquatus, dictator in 353, 349, and 320; and consul in 347, 344, and 340 BC, was a celebrated general, and won the name Torquatus for defeating a Gaulish champion in single combat, and taking his torque as a trophy. He is equally remembered for the severe discipline that he imposed upon his eldest son during his final consulship.
- Titus Manlius T. f. L. n. Torquatus, while serving as prefect in 340 BC, he was put to death by his father, the consul, after disobeying orders to engage an enemy champion in single combat, hoping to replicate his father's feat.
- Titus Manlius T. f. T. n. Torquatus, consul in 299 BC, thrown from his horse and killed.
- Lucius Manlius T. f. T. n. Torquatus, legate of Lucius Cornelius Scipio Barbatus in the great campaign of 295 BC.
- Aulus Manlius T. f. T. n. Torquatus Atticus, censor in 247 BC, consul in 244 and 241. He received a triumph during his second consulship for having thwarted a revolt of the Falisci.
- Titus Manlius T. f. T. n. Torquatus, consul in 235 and 224, censor in 231, propraetor in Sardinia in 215, and dictator in 208 BC. He was awarded a triumph in 235 for his campaign in Sardinia. He was also a pontiff.
- Aulus Manlius T. f. T. n. Torquatus, tribunus militum in 208 BC, he was killed with the consul Marcus Claudius Marcellus in a Carthaginian ambush near Petelia.
- Titus Manlius A. f. T. n. Torquatus, praetor in 170 BC, consul in 165, and ambassador to Egypt in 162. He also became pontiff in 170.
- Aulus Manlius A. f. T. n. Torquatus, praetor in 167 BC, and consul in 164.
- Titus Manlius T. f. A. n. Torquatus, praetor circa 136 BC. He was defeated by the revolted slaves of Eunus in Sicily.
- Decimus Junius Silanus Manlianus, a natural son of Titus Manlius Torquatus, the consul of 165 BC. He was adopted into the Junii Silani. He was praetor in 142.
- Aulus Manlius T. f. A. n. Torquatus, son of Titus Manlius Torquatus, the consul of 165 BC.
- Lucius Manlius T. f. T. n. Torquatus, quaestor between 113 and 112 BC. (Note: Broughton and Mitchell place his quaestorship much later, circa 94 and 96, respectively. However, Crawford's dating of circa 112 fits better with the chronology, as Lucius' son also minted coins with Sulla in 82.) He minted coins during his magistracy.
- Titus Manlius T. f. T. n. Torquatus, son of the praetor of circa 136 BC. He died at an old age since he was still alive in 54 to serve as witness on behalf of Gnaeus Plancius.
- Lucius Manlius L. f. T. n. Torquatus, proquaestor in the staff of Sulla in 82 BC, with whom he minted coins. He was then praetor in 68, perhaps proconsul of Asia in 67, consul in 65, and finally proconsul of Macedonia in 64 and 63.
- Titus Manlius T. f. T. n. Torquatus, possibly a praetor circa 69 BC. He studied under Apollonius Molon in Rhodes and was promised to the consulship, but died before he could be eligible.
- Manlia T. f. T. n., married her cousin Aulus Manlius Torquatus, the praetor of 70 BC.
- Publius Cornelius Lentulus Spinther, the natural son of the consul of 65 BC, he was adopted into the Manlii by Titus Manlius Torquatus after the death of his natural son. The adoption was just an artifice to make him eligible to the college of augurs, as it already counted a member of the gens Cornelia (Note: It was forbidden to have two members of the same gens in the college of pontiffs.) (Faustus Cornelius Sulla), but none of the Manlii. Spinther did not even make the pretext of changing his name.
- Aulus Manlius A. f. T. n. Torquatus, (Note: Broughton and Mitchell suppose that he was the Manlius who was quaestor in 81, but Crawford attributes the coins inscribed "A. Manli A. f. Q[uaestor]" to another Manlius, who was not one of the Torquati.) praetor in 70 BC, then propraetor of Africa in 69, and quaesitor in 52. He was also a legate of Pompeius in 67, tasked with the surveillance of the east of Spain and the Balearic Islands. He married his cousin, Manlia.
- Manlia, daughter of Aulus Manlius Torquatus, the consul of 65 BC, married Gnaeus Domitius Ahenobarbus.
- Lucius Manlius L. f. L. n. Torquatus, praetor in 50 or 49 BC, was a partisan of Pompeius. After the Battle of Thapsus in 46, he failed to escape to Spain, and committed suicide with Metellus Scipio on a ship.
- Aulus Manlius L. f. L. n. Torquatus, quaestor of Vibius Pansa in 43 BC. He supported Brutus and Cassius, but survived the proscriptions of the triumvirs, and later became a friend of Horace. He was perhaps a pontiff.
- (Aulus) Manlius A. f. A. n. Torquatus, (Note: Mitchell guesses that his name was Aulus, because typical Roman practice was for an eldest son to be named after his father.) the elder son of Aulus Manlius Torquatus, praetor in 70 BC.
- Titus Manlius A. f. A. n. Torquatus, present in the house of Caesar, where the case against Deiotarus was heard in 45 BC.

==== Stemma of the Manlii Torquati ====
Stemma taken from Münzer until "A. Manlius Torquatus, d. 208", and then Mitchell, with corrections. All dates are BC.

Legend
Green	Consul

T. Manlius Imperiosus Torquatus dict. 353, 349, 320 cos. 347, 344, 340
T. Manlius Torquatus d. 340
T. Manlius Torquatus cos. 299	L. Manlius Torquatus legate 295
T. Manlius Torquatus
T. Manlius Torquatus	A. Manlius Torquatus cens. 247; cos. 244, 241
T. Manlius Torquatus cos. 235, 224 cens. 231; dict. 208
A. Manlius Torquatus d. 208
T. Manlius Torquatus cos. 165	A. Manlius Torquatus cos. 164
T. Manlius Torquatus pr. 137	D. Junius; Silanus Manlianus pr. 142, d. 140
T. Manlius Torquatus	L. Manlius Torquatus qu. circa 113	A. Manlius Torquatus
T. Manlius Torquatus pr. 69	P. Cornelius; Lentulus Spinther (adopted) augur 57	Manlia	L. Manlius Torquatus cos. 65	A. Manlius Torquatus pr. 70
L. Manlius Torquatus pr. 49	A. Manlius Torquatus qu. 43, pontifex	A. Manlius Torquatus	T. Manlius Torquatus

=== Manlii Acidini ===
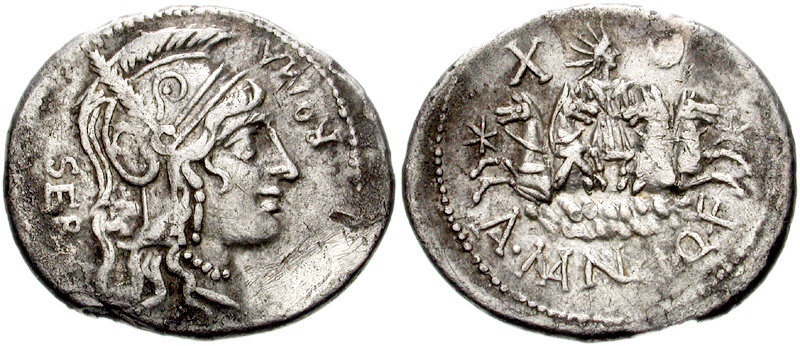
Denarius of Aulus Manlius, 118–107 BC. The obverse depicts a head of Roma, while Sol drives a quadriga on the reverse.

- Lucius Manlius L. f. Acidinus, praetor urbanus in 210 BC and proconsul of Hispania in 206, where he succeeded Scipio Africanus. He stayed in command there until 200.
- Lucius Manlius L. f. L. n. Fulvianus, the natural son of Quintus Fulvius Flaccus, was adopted by Lucius Manlius Acidinus, the praetor of 210 BC. Fulvianus was praetor in Hispania Citerior in 188 BC, proconsul in Spain from 187 to 185, an ambassador to the Gauls, and one of the triumvirs appointed to establish a colony at Aquileia in 183, and finally consul in 179, with his natural brother, Quintus Fulvius Flaccus.
- Lucius Manlius L. f. L. n. Acidinus, (Note: According to Münzer, he was the son of Lucius Manlius Vulso, praetor peregrinus in 218 BC.) a military tribune in 171 BC, and quaestor in 168.
- Manlius Acidinus M. f., (Note: Münzer and Brougton express doubt as to his filiation, based on the tradition respecting the intentional disuse of the praenomen Marcus following the death of Marcus Manlius Capitolinus in the fourth century BC. Münzer also doubts the existence of a collateral branch of the family, since the adoption of Fulvianus a generation earlier implies that the Acidini were on the verge of extinction.) military tribune in 171 BC.
- Manlius Acidinus, an acquaintance of the younger Cicero in 45 BC.

=== Others ===
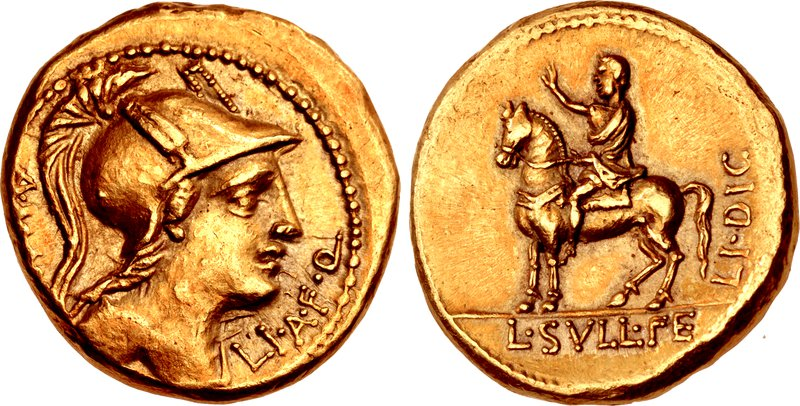
Aureus of Aulus Manlius, 80 BC. Roma is portrayed on the obverse. The reverse depicts an equestrian statue of Sulla, which was placed in front of the Rostra. The head of Roma looks like the one on the denarii of his father.

- Marcus Manlius Tullus, according to Livy, consul in 500 BC; evidently an error for Manius Tullius Longus.
- Publius Manlius, (Note: Münzer suggests that he was a Vulso, but Broughton disagrees, arguing that because he was succeeded as epulo by a plebeian, he must also have been a plebeian.) epulo in 196 BC, praetor in Hither Spain in 195. He may have been the person expelled from the Senate by Cato the Censor for having kissed his wife in front of his daughter. (Note: But this person is named as Manilius in Plutarch's text.) Praetor in 182, he was sent to Farther Spain, where he stayed as promagistrate for two years. He died upon his return from Spain in 180.
- Aulus Manlius Q. f., triumvir monetalis between 118 and 107 BC, and legate of Gaius Marius in 107, during the war against Jugurtha. He was one of the envoys sent to obtain Jugurtha's surrender. From the inscriptions on his coins, Münzer supposes that he bore the cognomen Sergianus.
- Titus Manlius Mancinus, triumvir monetalis between 111 and 110 BC and tribune of the plebs in 107.
- Aulus Manlius A. f. Q. n., quaestor in 80 BC. He minted gold coins during his magistracy, which shows he was a supporter of Sulla.
- Lucius Manlius, possibly praetor in 79 BC, and proconsul in Transalpine Gaul in 78. He was defeated in Spain by Lucius Hirtuleius, Sertorius' legate.
- Quintus Manlius A. f. Q. n., triumvir capitalis circa 77 BC, and tribune of the plebs in 69.
- Gnaeus Manlius, praetor in 72, defeated by Sertorius.
- Manlius Priscus, a legate of Pompey in 65 BC, during the war against Mithridates VI.
- Manlius Lentinus, legate of Gaius Pomptinus in Gallia Narbonensis, won a decisive victory over the Gauls, and captured the city of Ventia in 61 BC.
- Gnaeus Manlius, tribune of the plebs in 58 BC, proposed a law granting the libertini the right to vote as members of any tribe. The law was blocked by the praetor Lucius Domitius Ahenobarbus. Manlius is sometimes confused with Gaius Manilius, who proposed a similar law in 66 BC.
- Titus Manlius T. f., may have been a legate in Spain between 45 and 42 BC, as he is named on a coin of Brutobriga. From the inscription, Münzer supposes that his cognomen was Sergianus.
- Manlia Silana, wife of the equestrian Lucius Postumius Sergius Fabullus.
- Quintus Manlius Ancharius Tarquitius Saturninus, consul suffectus in AD 62, and proconsul of Africa in 72 and 73.
- Titus Manlius Valens, consul in AD 96, died the same year.
- Manlia Scantilla, wife of Didius Julianus, and Roman empress in AD 193.
- Anicius Manlius Severinus Boëthius, an influential Christian philosopher of the fifth century.

== See also ==
- List of Roman gentes

== Bibliography ==
- Polybius, Historiae (The Histories).
- Marcus Tullius Cicero, Brutus, De Finibus, De Lege Agraria contra Rullum, Pro Plancio, Pro Rege Deiotaro.
- Gaius Sallustius Crispus (Sallust), Bellum Jugurthinum (The Jugurthine War).
- Gaius Julius Caesar, De Bello Africo (The African War, attributed).
- Dionysius of Halicarnassus, Romaike Archaiologia (Roman Antiquities).
- Titus Livius (Livy), History of Rome.
- Asconius Pedianus, Commentarius in Oratio Ciceronis Pro Milone (Commentary on Cicero's Oration Pro Milone).
- Publius Cornelius Tacitus, Annales, Historiae.
- Lucius Mestrius Plutarchus (Plutarch), Lives of the Noble Greeks and Romans.
- Lucius Annaeus Florus, Epitome de T. Livio Bellorum Omnium Annorum DCC (Epitome of Livy: All the Wars of Seven Hundred Years).
- Appianus Alexandrinus (Appian), Bella Mithridatica (The Mithridatic Wars), Bellum Civile (The Civil War).
- Cassius Dio, Roman History.
- Paulus Orosius, Historiarum Adversum Paganos (History Against the Pagans).
- Joseph Hilarius Eckhel, Doctrina Numorum Veterum (The Study of Ancient Coins, 1792–1798).
- Dictionary of Greek and Roman Biography and Mythology, William Smith, ed., Little, Brown and Company, Boston (1849).
- Théophile Homolle, "Inscriptions de Délos relatives à des personnages romains", in Bulletin de Correspondance Hellénique, 1879, 3, pp. 146–162.
- August Pauly, Georg Wissowa, et alii, Realencyclopädie der Classischen Altertumswissenschaft, J. B. Metzler, Stuttgart (1894–1980).
- George Davis Chase, "The Origin of Roman Praenomina", in Harvard Studies in Classical Philology, vol. VIII (1897).
- Michael Grant, From Imperium to Auctoritas: a Historical Study of Aes Coinage in the Roman Empire, 49 BC–AD 14, Cambridge University Press (1946).
- Lily Ross Taylor, "Augustan Editing in the Capitoline Fasti", in Classical Philology, vol. 46, No. 2, pp. 73–80 (April 1951); The Voting Districts of the Roman Republic, University of Michigan Press (1960).
- Broughton, T. Robert S. (1952–1986). The Magistrates of the Roman Republic. American Philological Association.
- Jane F. Mitchell, "The Torquati", in Historia: Zeitschrift für Alte Geschichte, vol. 15, part 1, pp. 23–31 (January 1966).
- Harold Mattingly, "The Numismatic Evidence and the Founding of Narbo Martius", in Revue archéologique de Narbonnaise, No. 5, pp. 1–19 (1972).
- Sumner, G.V. (1973). The Orators in Cicero's Brutus: Prosopography and Chronology. University of Toronto Press. ISBN 0-8020-5281-9.
- Michael Crawford, Roman Republican Coinage, Cambridge University Press (1974–2001).
- M. Gwyn Morgan, "'Cornelius and the Pannonians': Appian, Illyrica 14, 41 and Roman History, 143–138 B.C.", in Historia: Zeitschrift für Alte Geschichte, vol. 23, part 2 (2nd Qtr., 1974), pp. 183–216.
