= Lucius Manlius Acidinus (praetor 210 BC) =

2nd-century BC Roman politician and general

Lucius Manlius Acidinus (fl. late 3rd century BC) was a member of the Manlia gens who stood as praetor urbanus in 210 BC. He was sent by the senate into Sicily to bring back the consul Marcus Valerius Laevinus to Rome to hold the elections. In 207 he was with the troops stationed at Narnia to oppose Hasdrubal, and was the first to send to Rome intelligence of the defeat of the latter. In 206 he and Lucius Cornelius Lentulus had the province of Hispania entrusted to them with proconsular power. In the following year he conquered the Ausetani and Ilergetes, who had rebelled against the Romans in consequence of the absence of Scipio. He did not return to Rome until 199, but was prevented by the tribune Publius Porcius Laeca from entering the city in an ovation, which the senate had granted him.

== See also ==
- Manlia gens, for others of this gens, see
- Acidinus (cognomen), for other Manlii with the cognomen "Acidinus"
