= Mallia gens =

Family in ancient Rome

The gens Mallia was a plebeian family at ancient Rome. Due to its relative obscurity, the nomen Mallius is frequently, but erroneously amended to the more common Manlius. The only member of this gens to obtain any of the higher curule magistracies under the Republic was Gnaeus Mallius Maximus, consul in 105 BC. Othere Mallii are known from epigraphy, including funerary inscriptions and military diplomas showing that various members of this gens served in auxiliary cohorts of the Roman army during imperial times.

== Members ==
This list includes abbreviated praenomina. For an explanation of this practice, see filiation.

- Gnaeus Mallius Maximus, father of the consul.
- Gnaeus Mallius Cn. f. Maximus, consul in 105 BC, received the province of Transalpine Gaul. He quarreled with the proconsul Quintus Servilius Caepio, a member of an ancient and aristocratic house, who considered the novus homo Mallius beneath his dignity. As a result, both forces were badly defeated at the Battle of Arausio, and Mallius lost two sons in the fighting. On their return, both men were prosecuted for their loss of the army. Servilius was defended by Lucius Licinius Crassus, the famous orator, and Mallius by Marcus Antonius, also a skilled rhetorician. Despite this, both men were condemned, interdicted from fire and water, and banished.
- Mallius Cn. f. Cn. n., name of two sons of the consul, both killed at the battle of Arausio.
- Gaius Mallius, an experienced centurion under Sulla, was recruited by Catiline for his Second Catilinarian conspiracy in BC 63, and stationed at Faesulae, where he was charged with gathering an army and necessary supplies. After the conspiracy was revealed, Mallius had command of the right wing of Catiline's forces against the consul Gaius Antonius Hybrida, but both he and Catiline fell in battle.
- Flavius Mallius Theodorus, sometimes called Manlius Theodorus, consul in AD 399, and the author of De Rerum Natura. Saint Augustine dedicated his De Vita Beata to Mallius.

== See also ==
- List of Roman gentes

== Bibliography ==
- Marcus Tullius Cicero, In Catilinam, De Oratore.
- Gaius Sallustius Crispus (Sallust), Bellum Catilinae (The Conspiracy of Catiline), Bellum Jugurthinum (The Jugurthine War).
- Titus Livius (Livy), Ab Urbe Condita (History of Rome).
- Lucius Cassius Dio Cocceianus (Cassius Dio), Roman History.
- Dictionary of Greek and Roman Biography and Mythology, William Smith, ed., Little, Brown and Company, Boston (1849).
- T. Robert S. Broughton, The Magistrates of the Roman Republic, American Philological Association (1952).
- Elena Dmitrieva, "The History of Acquisition of Jean-Baptiste Mallia's Collection of Engraved Gems by the State Hermitage Museum", in Reports of the State Hermitage Museum (2022).
