= Publius Manlius Vulso (praetor) =

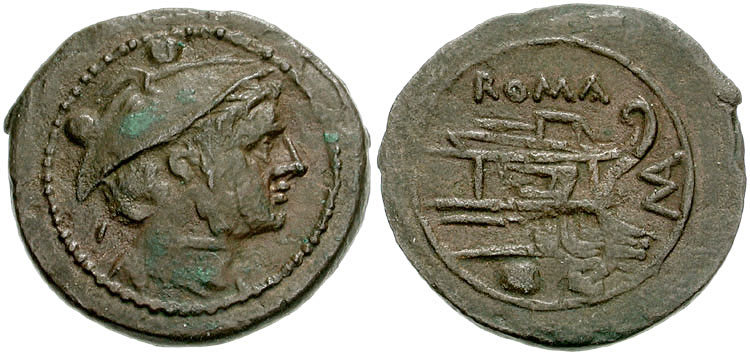
Bronze sextans possibly struck by authority of P. Manlius Vulso in Sardinian mint 210 BC

Publius Manlius Vulso was a member of the Roman patrician gens Manlia. In 210 BC he was praetor of Sardinia.

== Life ==
Publius Manlius Vulso held the office of praetor in the middle of the Roman fight against Hannibal, which is called the Second Punic War (218-201 BC). He commanded two legions in order to defend Sardinia against the Carthaginians. Yet a Punic fleet led by Hamilcar ravaged at the end of the summer of 210 BC Olbia, a city on the north-east coast of the island. When Manlius and his army appeared on the battlefield the Carthaginians sailed on and devastated the district of Carales (today Cagliari). Nothing else is known about the life of Manlius.
