= Publius Porcius Laeca (tribune 199 BC) =

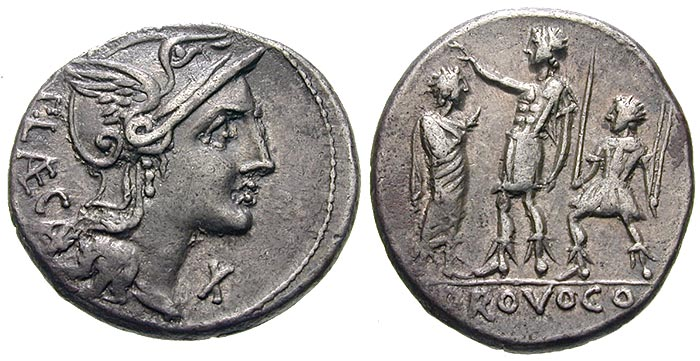
Denarius minted by Publius Porcius Laeca (110–109 BC), depicting Roma (obverse) and a scene representing citizen's right of appeal (reverse).

Publius Porcius Laeca (2nd-century BC) was a Roman politician.

== Biography ==
Publius Porcius Laeca was tribune of the plebs in 199 BC, when he prevented Lucius Manlius Acidinus from entering Rome to celebrate an ovation granted by the Roman Senate. As tribune, he proposed the Lex Porcia. In 196, he was one of the tresviri epulones. He was assigned as praetor in 195 to Pisa with the task of fighting the Ligurians.
