= Nuclear power in Portugal =

Nuclear energy in Portugal is very limited and strictly non-commercial. Portugal has one 1MW research reactor located in the National Nuclear Research Centre at Sacavém, which is in permanent shutdown state. Further nuclear energy activities are not planned in the near future. Other nuclear activities include medical applications such as radiology, radiotherapy and nuclear medicine, as well as use of industrial radioactive sources.

In 1971, Portugal planned to build an 8,000 MW nuclear power plant to be completed by 2000. Plans were delayed until 1995 when it was decided to not proceed with the project. In 2004, the Government of Portugal rejected a proposal to reconsider its decision. After the Carnation Revolution, a military coup in April 1974 which overthrew the Estado Novo regime, projects for the construction of nuclear power plants have since been postponed or dismissed by the government.

Presently Portugal has no spent fuel. In September 2007, the core of the Portuguese Research Reactor (RPI) was converted from high enriched to low enriched fuel, all enriched uranium as well as all spent fuel has been shipped to the United States in the framework of the “United States Foreign Research Reactor Spent Nuclear Fuel Acceptance Program”. Liquid effluents produced in the RPI, as well as effluents of medical applications are stored locally, and later discharged in accordance with national law. Solid radioactive waste and discarded sealed sources are centrally stored in the national intermediate radioactive waste storage.

== History ==
=== 1948 to 1954 ===
Portugal first began developing nuclear energy in 1948, when the Instituto para a Alta Cultura (Superior Culture Institute) proposed the creation of a commission of geologists and physicists to study uranium supplies and mining technologies to the Ministry for National Education. The project was declined. At the same time, the 2nd National Engineering Meeting suggested the meeting participants to propose a general plan for the future utilization of atomic energy in Portugal.

The first approved proposal arrived in 1952, after an early rejection in 1950, when the National Education Ministry presented an item for the National General Budget to specifically finance studies related to the development of nuclear energy in the country. During October 1952, the temporary Commission for Nuclear Energy Studies was created and formed a partnership with the Portuguese universities, becoming the first centers for nuclear energy research in Portugal, both pure and applied.

In March 1954 the Nuclear Energy Board (Junta de Energia Nuclear, or JEN) was created; its role consisted initially in an inspection of the current situation of uranium supplies both in Portugal and its overseas territories (particularly the vast mineral potential of both Angola and Mozambique in Africa). Later on, the JEN created the Laboratory for Nuclear Engineering and Physics (Laboratório de Física e Engenharia Nucleares, or LFEN), which was inaugurated in 1961 as the first Portuguese center for education and research for the benefit of both universities and industry.

=== 1955 to 1969 ===
In 1955 the first proposal for building a nuclear plant was made, professor Alberto Abecassis Manzanares, of the Instituto Superior Técnico, stated the importance of building an experimental low power reactor (between 5000 and 10000 kW), which would serve to gather enough experience for handling higher power reactors. In 1957, at the 2nd Portuguese Industry Meeting, Armando Gilbert presented a communication in which he underlined the importance of beginning to use nuclear energy, starting from 1965. Later on, in the first Meeting of Portuguese Technicians for Nuclear Energy, this deadline was extended by about 10 years.

The first concrete step was taken in April 1958, when the Portuguese Association of Nuclear Companies (Companhia Portuguesa de Indústrias Nucleares, or CPIN) was created. CPIN was a joint venture of several companies, including the Portuguese conglomerate Companhia União Fabril (CUF). CPIN, in 1959, began to intensify the studies and to train engineers for the installation of a first pilot nuclear plant, with approximate power of 50 MWe, to be completed by 1965. Three years later it presented the preliminary studies for a 230 MWe nuclear plant equipped with a boiling water reactor.

In 1964 CPIN sold its assets to the Portuguese thermo-electric company (Empresa Termoeléctrica Portuguesa, or ETP), which one year later presented a joint project with Electricity Company of Sevilla (Spain) for a nuclear plant close to the Guadiana River. In 1969, ETP presented preliminary studies regarding the choice of a site for the first Portuguese nuclear plant. From the six originally proposed locations, the final choice was between Ferrel and Sizandro. A nuclear plant was to be made operational by the end of the 1970s in Sizandro.

=== 1970 to 1979 ===
In 1972 the Portuguese electrical company Companhia Portuguesa de Electricidade (CPE) foresees 1979 as the year in which the first Portuguese reactor would start its activity. The plan was to build four reactors at different times between 1981 and 1989, with an investment of about 30 million contos, at 1972 prices (about 350 million euros at 2010 prices). In 1974 CPE contracted a consulting firm to evaluate the best site for the installation of the first Portuguese nuclear power plant. Ferrel, near Peniche, was chosen as the best option. In April 1974 the Estado Novo, the authoritarian right-leaning regime of Portugal, was overthrown due to a leftist military coup. The proposed nuclear power plant in Ferrel became a focal point of resistance as in 1976, local residents marched to the planned construction site to protest the project and disrupt preparatory work. Another study was exposed in December 1977 to the secretary for energy and mines, which presented the possibility of building 4 to 7 1000 MWe nuclear reactors between 1990 and 2000. The government though decided to delay the decision.

=== 1980 to 1986 ===
The national energy plan in 1982 included the opening of a nuclear plant that generated 950 MWe power in 1995, which would lead to a nuclear program that would bring up to 9000 MWe of installed power by 2010. The VIII Constitutional Government did not approve this plan, but sent it to be discussed in a public debate. The following version of the National Energy Plan, in 1984, also planned the installation of 950 MWe reactors between 1998 and 2010, but the decision process stopped while doing location analysis because the International Atomic Energy Agency would not reach a formal position on the issue.

The official halt to a possible nuclear energy plan came from the State Secretary of Environment of the X Constitutional Government in 1986. Although the Minister for Industry and Commerce and the State Secretary of Industry did not agree with this position, the then Prime Minister of Portugal Aníbal Cavaco Silva rectified it, becoming an official government decision.

=== 20-year hiatus ===
In the following 20 years, nuclear energy became a taboo for Portugal. The XIII Constitutional Government (1995–1999), led by António Guterres, decided to adopt an energy policy focused on renewable energies. At the end of that parliamentary term, the government emitted the joint order number 531/99, in which it formalized the position of Portugal on the nuclear energy issue at international level. The overall position is a gradual retirement from both the industry and the research and development scene in this field. These propositions are popular amongst the people, who 70% do not want nuclear plants built in their country.

=== 2005 to present ===
It was only in February 2005 that nuclear was brought once again to attention when the businessman Patrick Monteiro de Barros, together with other promoters, proposed the construction of a 1600 MWe EPR reactor. The possible location for that plant was not revealed, although rumours stated that Mogadouro, close to the Douro river could be the one. The project never reached a debate stage. The strong opposition from the environmentalist organisations and companies involved in the renewable energy business forbid not only the further development of Monteiro de Barros project, but of the nuclear option in any form.

== Nuclear regulatory authority ==
The Independent Commission for Radiological Protection and Nuclear Safety (CIPRSN), created by Decree Law 139/2005 of 17 August, is an independent body currently working towards the creation of a national regulatory authority. The President of the CIPRSN is nominated by the Prime Minister, and is entitled to represent Portugal in the European Nuclear Security Regulators Group (ENSREG).

The Portuguese representatives in ENSREG are members of the following institutions:

- The Centre for Nuclear Physics of the University of Lisbon.
- Nuclear Technology Institute.

== See also ==
- Energy in Portugal
