= Nuclear power in Spain =

Nuclear power plants in Spain (view)
Active plants
Closed plants
Unfinished plants

The contribution from nuclear power to Spain's energy portfolio increased until about 1988 and remained near constant from there on. After that its market share declined as demand rose.

Spain has five active nuclear power plants with seven reactors producing 20% of the country's electricity as of 2023.

A nuclear power moratorium was enacted by the Socialist government in 1983. For a time, the country had a policy of phasing out nuclear power in favor of renewables. It ended in 1997 but no public or private company has been interested in building new nuclear plants. The oldest unit (at José Cabrera nuclear power plant) was shut down at the end of 2006, 40 years after its construction. In December 2012, the Garoña plant was also shut down. In 2011, the government lifted the 40-year limit on all reactors, allowing owners to apply for license extensions in 10-year increments. In 2025, nuclear power produced 19% of the country’s electricity.

== History ==
In early 1947, a commission was created within the National Research Council to deal with issues of "Technical Physics of greatest interest to the country." In the middle of that year, the Naval Attaché of the United States Embassy in Spain, brought to the Laboratory and Workshop on Research Staff of the Navy an extensive collection of US journals specializing in nuclear fission and its civil and military applications.

To that end, establishing the Atomic Research Board in the form of a study (Irani 1987). His work during the triennium (1948–1950) focuses on two aspects. On the one hand, begin to train abroad the first Spanish experts on nuclear issues. On the other hand, begins the search for uranium to serve as raw material for the development of the first investigations. Studies conducted by the Board, led by Decree-Law on 22 October 1951 to the Nuclear Energy Board, which aims to provide new knowledge in the process of energy production.

In 1963, three significant events occur: the beginning of Project Islero, the enactment of the Nuclear Energy Act, and the construction of the first Spanish nuclear plant, Zorita in Guadalajara, later known as José Cabrera. In June 1965 construction began three years after the plant was synchronized and provided power to the grid for the first time. Three years later it opened in 1971, launched the Santa Maria de Garoña (Burgos), with a capacity of 460 MW. In 1972, the network was connected to the Spanish-French central Vandellós (Tarragona) with a capacity of 500 MW.

Soon on a plan was drafted to open four nuclear stations in the Basque region, i.e. Deba, Lemóniz, Ispazter and Tudela. The plan faced strong opposition and protests across the area, with all four drafted nuclear stations finally concentrating in just one located at Lemoniz. However, following a violent campaign by ETA to stop it, it finally did not come into operation either. The Spanish government officially declared a moratorium in 1984.

The fire occurred in 1989 in Vandellós destroyed part of its facilities. After evaluating the technical and economic feasibility of repair made a year after the fire, led to the decision to withdraw this plant. Zorita, Vandellòs and Garoña, the three so-called first-generation plants, represent a combined capacity of 1,220 MW. Following the good results obtained in them and the growing need for energy, it was decided to build seven new groups (four plants) of much greater production capacity, resulting in an additional nuclear power of 6,500 MW.

At the beginning of 1981, the first group of Almaraz (Cáceres) began producing power with a capacity of 930 MW. In 1983, the reactor Ascó (Tarragona) came into operation with a capacity of 930 MW, as well as a second group with the same power in Almaraz.

In 1984 he inaugurated the central Cofrents (Valencia) with a capacity of 975 MW, a year after the network is connected to the second reactor of the 930 MW Ascó group. In December 1987, enters the central testing period Vandellós II, and finally, in 1989 is put into operation the central Trillo I (Guadalajara) to 1066 MW.

As shown, nuclear power plants in Spain are located in the northern half. This is because the area is less impacted by seismic activity on the peninsula, and where the presence of large rivers Tajo and Ebro meet their needs for water used for cooling.

=== Current situation ===
Spain has a total of 10 nuclear installations within their mainland, among which are six stations, which are a total of eight nuclear units: Almaraz I and II, Ascó I and II, Cofrents, Trillo, and Vandellós I and II. The José Cabrera, better known as Zorita, ceased operations on 30 April 2006. So did Santa Maria de Garoña in 2012. On the other hand, Vandellós I is being dismantled.

Spain also possesses a nuclear fuel factory in Salamanca (Juzbado) and a storage facility for radioactive waste at low and intermediate level in Córdoba (El Cabril).

In 2018, Teresa Ribera signed an agreement with Endesa, Iberdrola and Naturgy, which postponed the decommissioning of all Spanish nuclear power plants from 2028 to 2035.

In August 2026, the Spanish Government authorised an extension of the Almaraz nuclear power plant's operational licence until 8 June 2030, published in the Official State Gazette. Unit I received a 31-month extension beyond its originally scheduled 2027 closure, and Unit II a 19-month extension beyond its 2028 deadline. The Nuclear Safety Council (CSN) had issued a favourable report on 16 July 2026, following a formal request submitted by the plant's co-owners (Iberdrola, Endesa and Naturgy) in October 2025. The overall nuclear phase-out schedule remains set for 2035. The Almaraz extension brings both units broadly in line with the scheduled closure dates of Spain's other operating reactors. Under the 2018 agreement signed by Minister Teresa Ribera with the plant operators, the remaining active reactors are scheduled for progressive closure through 2035: Ascó I and Cofrentes in 2030, Vandellós II and Ascó II in 2031, and Trillo (Spain's newest reactor) in 2035.

== Nuclear power plants ==
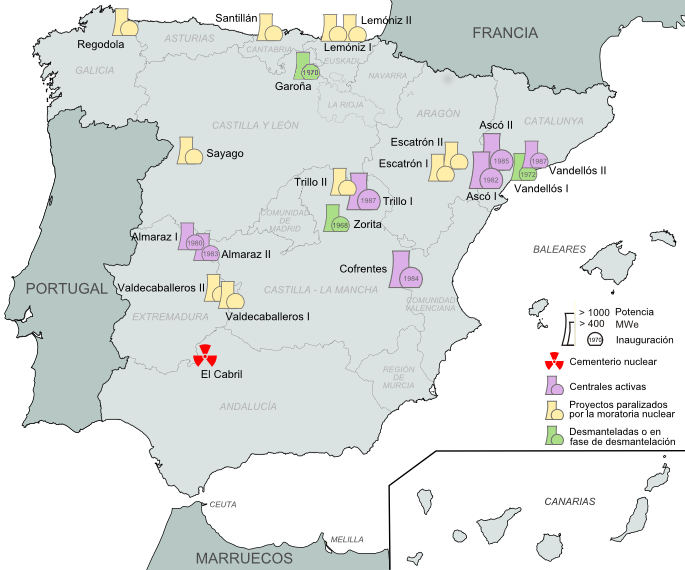
Situation of nuclear power plants in Spain (in Spanish)

In 1964, Spain began construction on its first of three nuclear reactors and completed construction in 1968. This became the first commercial nuclear reactor. In the 1970s, Spain began construction on seven second-generation reactors but only completed five. A moratorium was enacted by the socialist government in 1983. Spain stopped the building of new nuclear power plants in 1984.

The first generation of nuclear plants in Spain were all turnkey projects, including the José Cabrera Nuclear Power Plant and the Vandellòs Nuclear Power Plant.

The second generation of plants was domestically built by companies including Empresarios Agrupados, INITEC, and ENSA (Equipos Nucleares SA). Five of these were built.

The third generation of Spanish plants (not to be confused with Generation III) includes the Trillo-1 and Vandellos-2. All of the other five units of this series were halted in the middle of construction after a moratorium stopping further construction passed in 1994. Capacity of the nuclear fleet has still increased since then due to power uprates.

A leak of radioactive material from the Ascó I nuclear power plant in November 2007 sparked protests. The country's government has pledged to shut down its eight nuclear reactors once wind and solar energy become viable alternatives, such as in neighbouring country Portugal.

In December 2023, the socialist government announced its intention to phase out nuclear energy, starting with the decommissioning of the country's first nuclear reactor in 2027. The estimated cost for the complete decommissioning process is expected to be around €20.2 billion.

== Fuel cycle ==
ENUSA is a company in Spain with various holdings in uranium mining. A Uranium mine in Saelices el Chico was operated for some time, but is now decommissioned, and Spain imports all of its uranium fuel.

State-owned Empresa Nacional de Residuos Radiactivos SA was established in 1984 and is the responsible outfit for radioactive waste disposal and decommissioning. There is a temporary dry storage facility at the Trillo Nuclear Power Plant, and research for a long-term geological repository won't commence until 2010.

== Nuclear waste ==
Spain stores nuclear waste at the reactor sites for ten years with no reprocessing. Plans for future storage include a temporary storage facility in Trillo until the establishment of a longer-term storage facility. Funding for nuclear waste management is paid by a tax of 1% on all revenues from nuclear power.

As of 2017, Spain has extended the life of the Almaraz Nuclear Power Plant, and a nuclear storage facility will be built according to the Spanish Secretary of State for the EU, Jorge Toledo Albiñana, stating work will start regardless of Portugal's complaints, and uranium bars that will remain radioactive for the next 300 years will be stored on site.

In July 2022, the initial container with used fuel from the Garoña plant was placed in its onsite interim dry storage. There are plans to create 44 more containers for the remaining 2,245 used fuel rods.

== See also ==
- Electricity sector in Spain
- Energy in Spain
- Anti-nuclear movement in Spain
- Spanish Nuclear Safety Council
