= Anti-nuclear movement in Spain =

The late 1950s and early 1960s saw a strong push from the Spanish Government to establish a national nuclear power industry. In response to the surge in nuclear power plant plans, a strong anti-nuclear movement emerged in 1973, which ultimately impeded the realisation of most of the projects.

Conflict concerning the Lemóniz Nuclear Power Plant in the Basque province of Vizcaya was one of the major anti-nuclear issues in the 1970s and 1980s. Influenced by the terrorist group ETA, who killed some workers, including the industrial engineer José María Ryan, the socialist government approved a moratorium in late March 1984, and ultimately only ten of the 37 originally planned commercial nuclear reactors were built in Spain. Since the liberalisation of the electricity market, no new nuclear power plant has been planned in Spain.

The unresolved question of long-term disposal of high-level radioactive waste has been a contentious issue. Compared to other European Union countries, Spanish citizens generally show more negative attitudes towards the use of nuclear power.

As of 2017 Spain has extended the life of the Almaraz Nuclear Power Plant and a nuclear storage facility will be built according to the Spanish secretary of State for the EU Jorge Toledo Albiñana, stating work will start regardless of Portugals complaints, and uranium bars that will remain radioactive for the next 300 years will be stored on site.

Madrid anti-nuclear protests in 2011
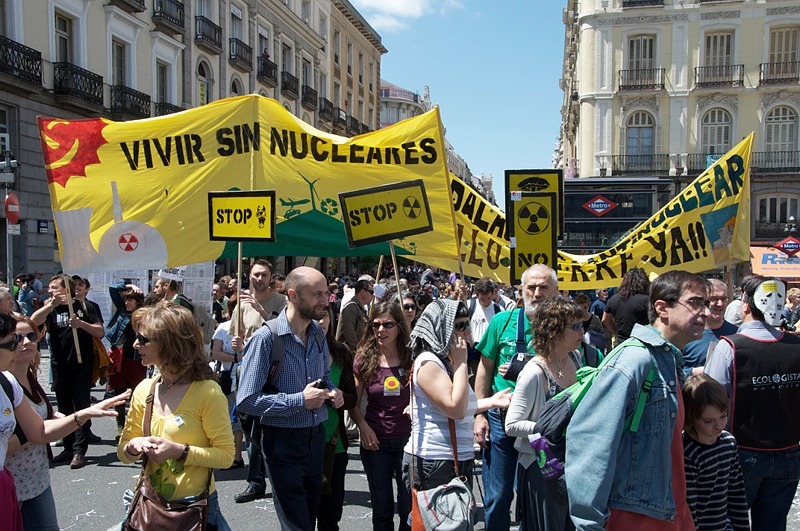

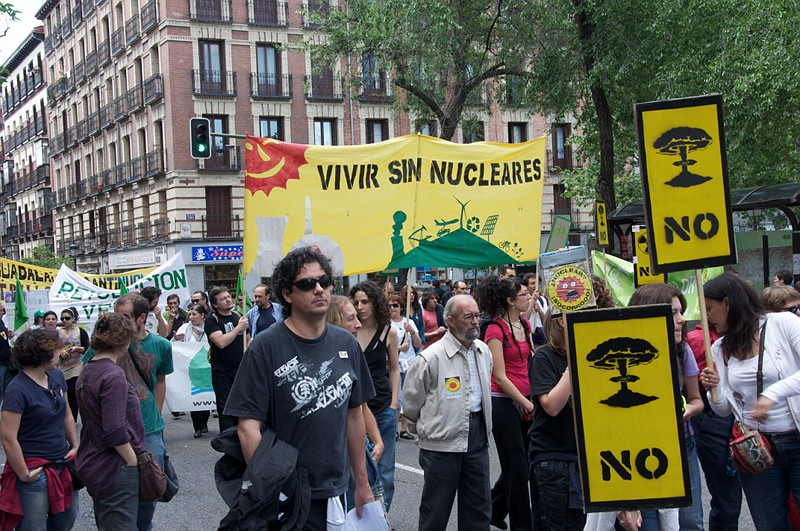

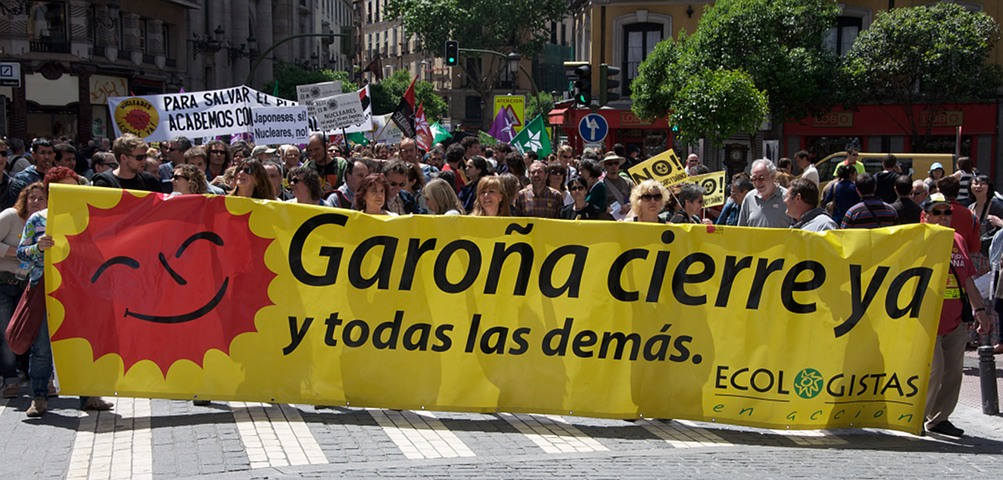

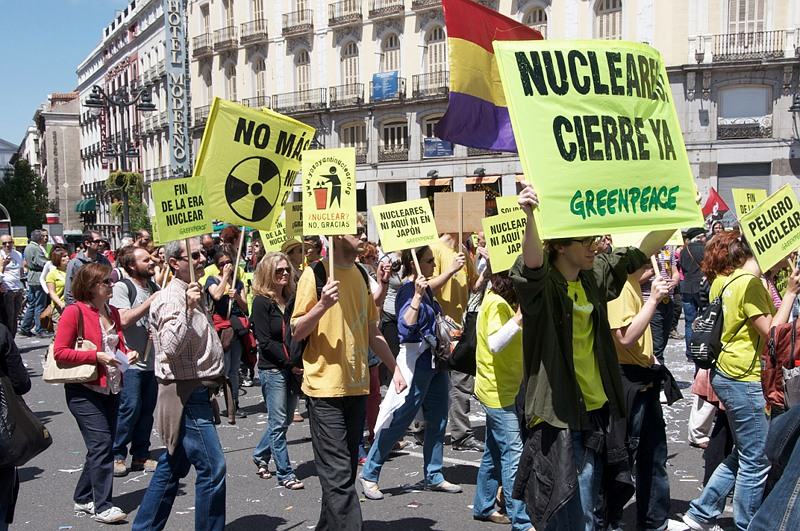

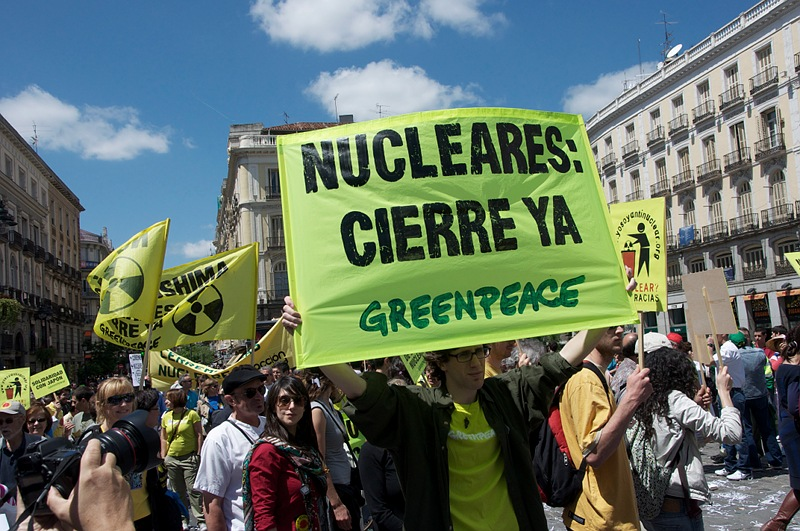

== See also ==
- Nuclear power in Spain
- List of anti-nuclear power groups
- Gladys del Estal
- List of nuclear whistleblowers
- List of Nuclear-Free Future Award recipients
- Renewable energy in Spain
- Wind power in Spain
