= Geothermal power in Portugal =

Portugal is a producer of geothermal power, and their main investment is in the Azores. While electricity is only produced on São Miguel, Azores, direct-use applications are also at Chaves in northern Portugal, at S. Pedro do Sul in central Portugal and at the Lisbon Air Force Hospital.

== Azores ==
In the Azores, five geothermal power plants exist on São Miguel, one near Pico Vermelho (since 1981, 3,5 GWh in 2003) and four binary cycle power plants in Ribeira Grande (85,4 GWh in 2003) which have together an installed capacity of 16 MWe. Another one on Terceira (12 MWe). In 2003, 25% of the electricity consumed on São Miguel was produced by geothermal energy.

In 2001, the geothermal energy contribution reached 35%.

Capacity (in MWt):
| Island | Total (MW_{t}) |
|---|---|
| S. Miguel | 173 |
| Terceira | 25 |
| Faial | 12 |
| Pico | 8,9 |
| S. Jorge | 8 |
| Graciosa | 5 |
| Flores | 2.5 |
| Corvo | 1,1 |
| Total | 235,5 |

== See also ==
- Renewable energy in Portugal
- Wind power in Portugal
- Solar power in Portugal
- List of renewable energy topics by country
- Renewable energy in the European Union
