= Electricity sector in Spain =

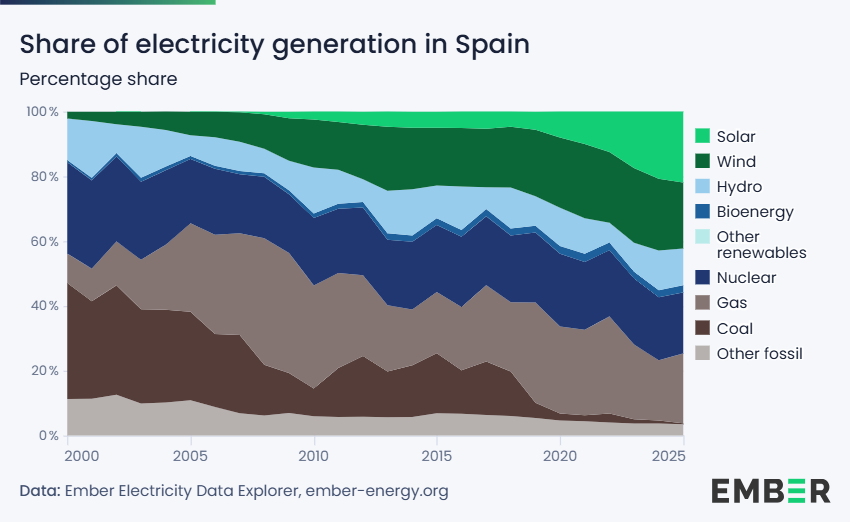
Electricity generation in Spain by source - percentage share

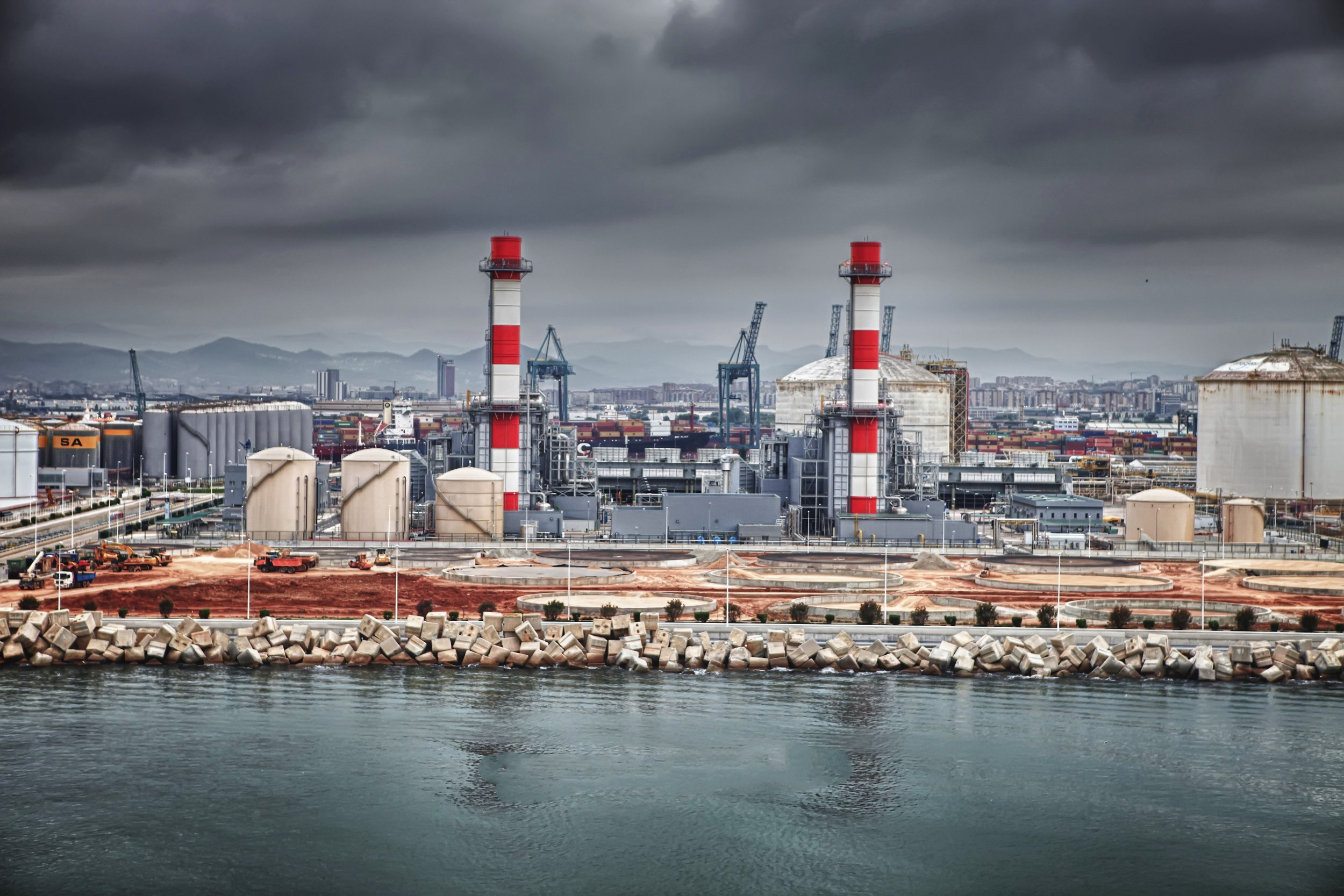
Barcelona power station

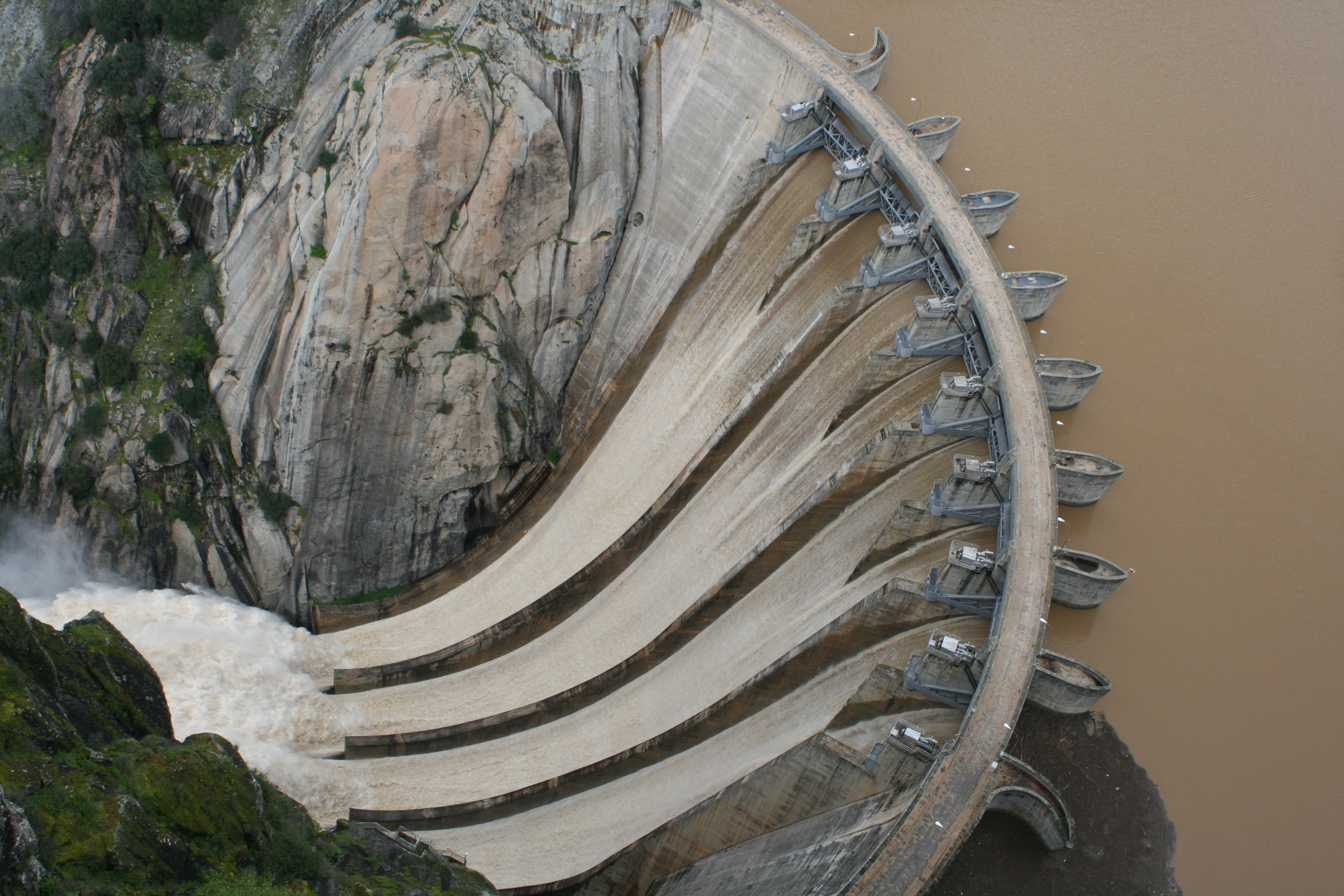
Aldeadávila Dam

Electricity consumption increased over many years until 2008. In 2025, Spain consumed 256,086 gigawatt hours (GWh) of electricity, an increase of 2.8% from 2024.

In 2008, Spain consumed 88% of the average electricity consumption for a European Union 15 country. In 2009, Spain exported about 3% of the electricity it produced. The volume of renewable electricity produced in 2009 was 5% greater than in 2004, and accounted for about 26% of the electricity consumption.

In 2025, renewable energy sources accounted for 55.5% of electricity generation in Spain. Wind was the leading generation technology for the third consecutive year, accounting for 21.6% of the country's electricity generation.

== Electricity per person and by power source ==
In 2008, Spanish electricity consumption was an average of 6,523 kWh/person. Spanish electricity usage constituted 88% of the EU15 average (EU15: 7,409 kWh/person), and 73% of the OECD average (8,991 kWh/person). While the amount of nuclear power remained steady at about 50 TWh/year, its share declined notably between 2004 and 2005 as consumption increased. The volume of nuclear power per person has declined consistently during 2004–2009.

Electricity pro person in Spain (kWh/ hab.)
	Use	Production	Export	Exp. %	Fossil	Nuclear	Nuc. %	Other RE	Bio+waste	Wind	Non RE use*	RE %
2004	6,489	6,559	−70	−1.1 %	3,739	1,490	23.0%	1,174	157		5,158	20.5%
2005	6,744	6,776	−32	−0.5%	4,244	1,326	19,7%	1,135	71		5,538	17.9%
2006	6,734	6,862	−128	−1.9 %	4,208	1,234	18.3%	1,305	115		5,314	21.1%
2008	6,523	6,764	−241	−3.7 %	4,066	1,286	19,7%	1,318	94		5,111	21.6%
2009	6,145	6,320	−176	−2.9 %	3,582	1,143	18.6%	707*	91	794*	4,553	25.9%
* Other RE is waterpower, solar and geothermal electricity and wind power until 2008 * Non RE use = use − production of renewable electricity * RE % = (production of RE / use) * 100% Note: European Union calculates the share of renewable energies in gross electrical consumption.

== Mode of production ==
External images
- Today's demand and production (Flash)
- Today's production by type

According to IEA the electricity use (gross production + imports − exports − transmission/distribution losses) in Spain was in 2004 253 TWh, (2007) 282 TWh and (2008) 288 TWh, while the use was in 2008 in France 494 TWh and Germany 587 TWh.

Electricity production from natural gas in 2008 was in Spain 122 TWh, exceeded in Europe only by Russia 495 TWh, United Kingdom 177 TWh and Italy 173 TWh. By 2025, Spain had 6.3 GW hydropower, 7.3 GW of hydro storage and 60 MW batteries. Spain approved new storage legislation after the 2025 blackout, and by the end of 2025, about 0.5 GW was underway. Researchers from the University of Seville calculate that daily price spread would reduce if battery capacity is over 15 GWh, becoming uneconomic beyond 30 GWh.

=== Transmission ===
External images
- 2004 High voltage grid of Spain and Portugal Archive
- Collection of current grid maps

Red Eléctrica de España operates around 20,000 km each of 400kV and 220kV power lines.

Spain is technically part of the Synchronous grid of Continental Europe. However, in 2014, Spain had an electricity interconnection level (international transmission capacity relative to production capacity) of 2% (below the recommended 10% level), effectively islanding the Iberian Peninsula. Spain only connects with Portugal, Morocco and France. As such, the Iberian grid has 3 GW of interconnection.

The 600/900 MW Spain-Morocco interconnection has operated for decades.

The 2 GW HVDC INELEF powerline between Spain and France was opened in 2015. By 2026, Spain's electricity interconnection level was 4%, well belov the recommended 10% level.

== Renewable energy in Spain ==
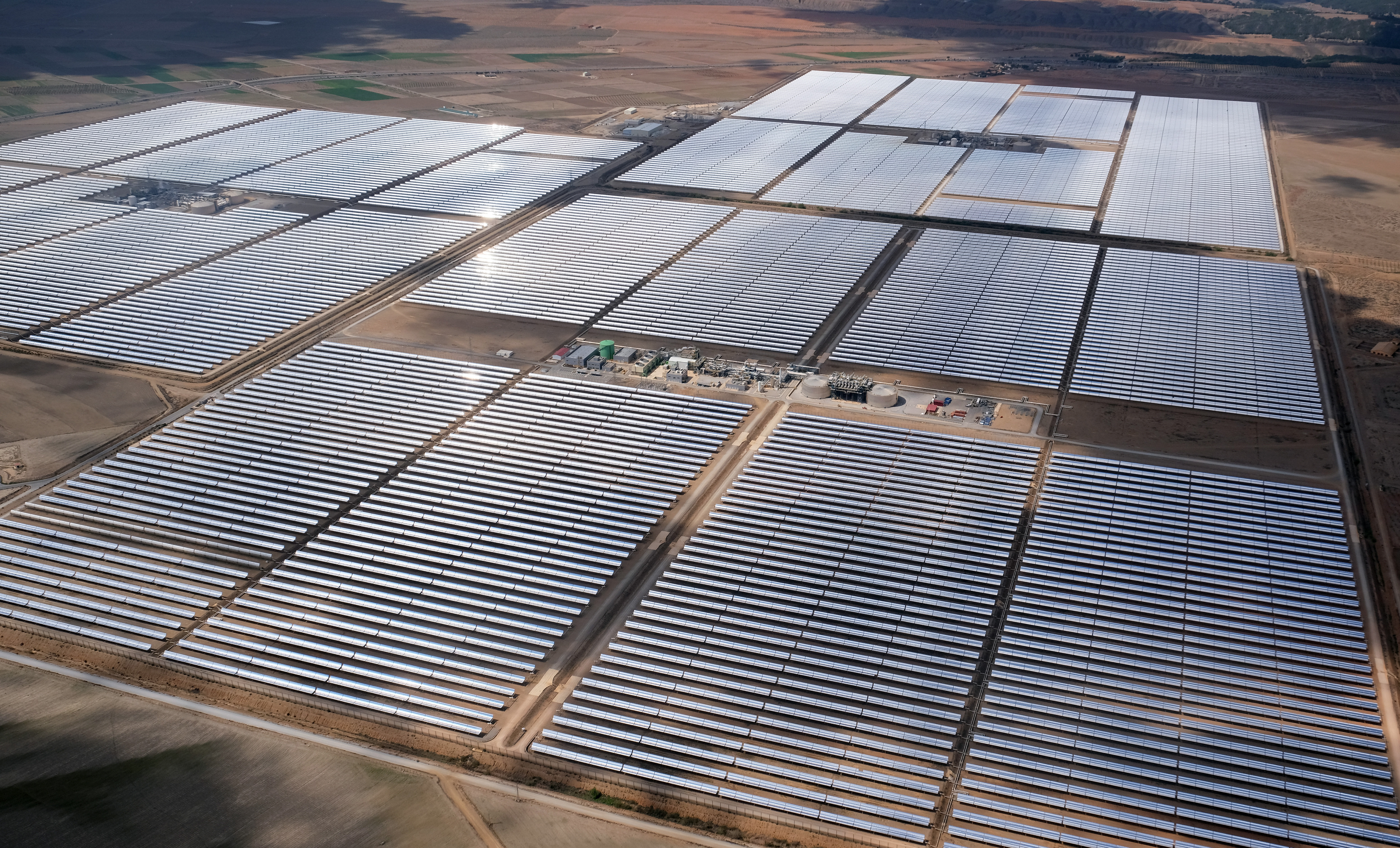
Andasol is the first parabolic trough power plant in Europe, and Andasol 1 went online in March 2009. Because of the high altitude (1,100 m) and the semi-arid climate, the site has exceptionally high annual direct insolation of 2,200 kWh/m^{2} per year.

In 2009 Spain produced 13% wind power compare to the use of electricity (794/ 6,145) The wind capacity installed at end 2010 will, in a normal wind year, produce 14.4% of electricity, when the equivalent value for Germany is 9.4%, Portugal 14% and Denmark 24%.

== See also ==
- Energy in Spain
