= Energy in Spain =

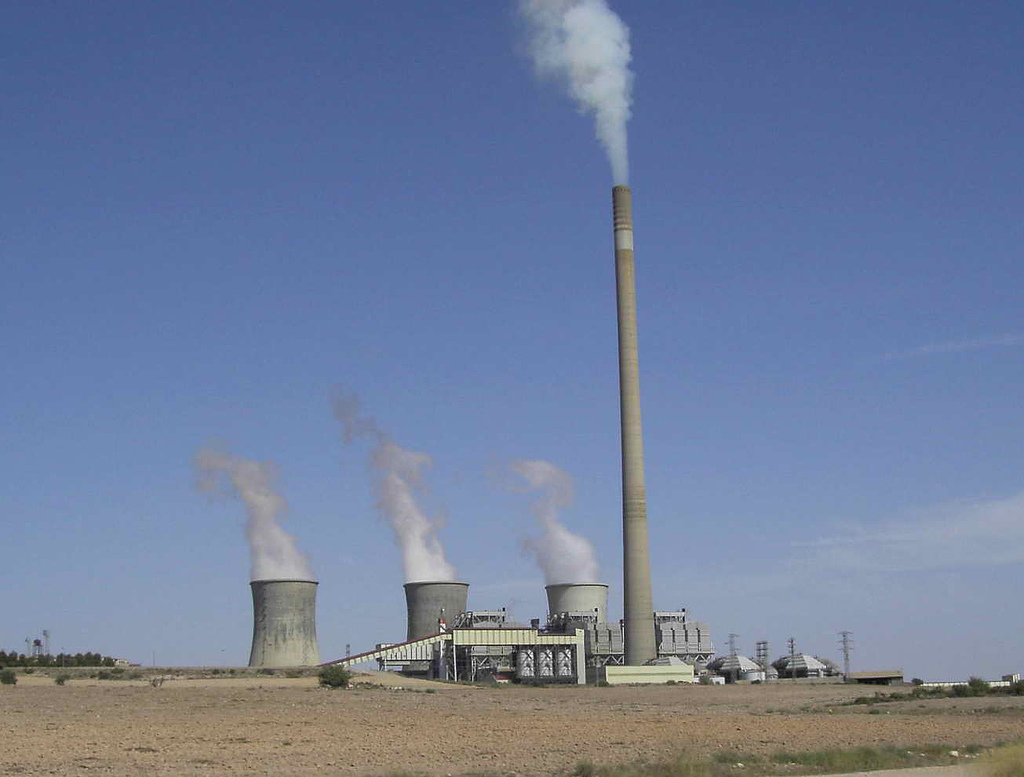
Andorra Thermal Power Station (Teruel).

Primary energy consumption in Spain in 2020 was mainly composed of fossil fuel sources. The largest sources are petroleum (42.3%), natural gas (19.8%) and coal (11.6%). The remaining 26.3% is accounted for by nuclear energy (12%) and various renewable energy sources (14.3%). Domestic production of primary energy includes nuclear (44.8%), solar, wind and geothermal (22.4%), biomass and waste (21.1%), hydropower (7.2%) and fossil (4.5%).

== Energy statistics ==
2020 energy statistics

Production capacities for electricity (billion kWh)
Type	Amount
Fossil fuel	328.77
Wind power	224.26
Nuclear	222.23
Hydro	132.93
Solar	82.19
Biomass	26.38
Total	1,016.76

Electricity (billion kWh)
Category	Amount
Consumption	233.27
Production	253.99
Import	17.93
Export	14.65

Natural Gas (billion m^{3})
Consumption	32.03
Production	0.01
Import	32.49
Export	1.19

Crude Oil (barrels per day)
Consumption	1,330,000
Production	47,200
Import	1,360,000

CO_{2} emissions:
202.71 million tons

== Energy plan ==
By 2030 the government plan is to have 62 GW of wind power installed, 76 GW of photovoltaic power, 4.8 GW of solar thermal power, 1.4 GW of biomass power, and 22 GW of storage. This should give a 32% decrease in greenhouse gasses compared to 1990. The long term plan is to achieve carbon neutrality before 2050.

== Energy sources ==
=== Fossil fuels ===
==== Coal ====
In December 2021 Spain had a capacity of 4.1 GW using coal as the energy source, in 2022 consumption was 6.5Mt, although the plan is to phase coal out by 2030.

Coal production 2011-2023 (Exajoules)
2011	2012	2013	2014	2015	2016	2017	2018	2019	2020	2021
0.11	0.10	0.07	0.07	0.05	0.03	0.05	0.04	<0.005	<0.005	<0.005

==== Natural gas ====
Algeria is Spain's largest natural gas supplier. Amid the deterioration of relations with Morocco, Algeria decided not to renew the contract of the Maghreb–Europe Gas Pipeline (GME), which expired at midnight on 31 October 2021. From November 1 on, natural gas exports to Spain are primarily transported through the Medgaz pipeline (with the short-term possibility of covering further demand either by expanding the Medgaz or by shipping LNG).

Natural gas consumption 2011-2021 (billion cubic metres)
2011	2012	2013	2014	2015	2016	2017	2018	2019	2020	2021	2022	2023
33.6	33.2	30.3	27.5	28.5	29.1	31.7	31.5	36.0	32.5	33.9	33.0	29.3

The demand for natural gas in Spain in 2022 was 364.3 TWh. Gas used for power generation increased 52% from 2021, with household, commercial and industrial demand for gas falling 21% to 226.4 TWh.

=== Renewable energy ===
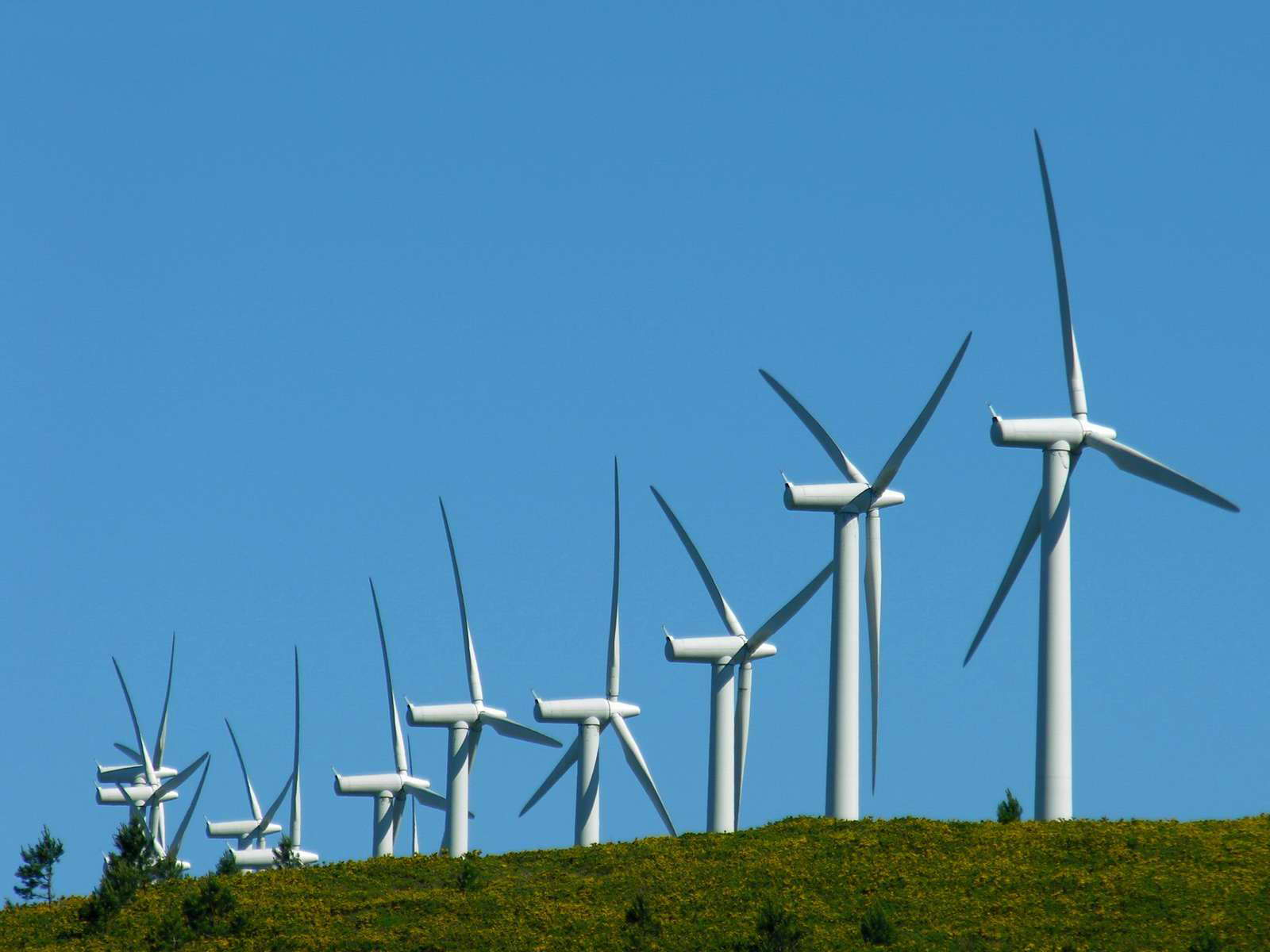
Wind turbines in Galicia, the fourth largest producer of wind power in Spain.

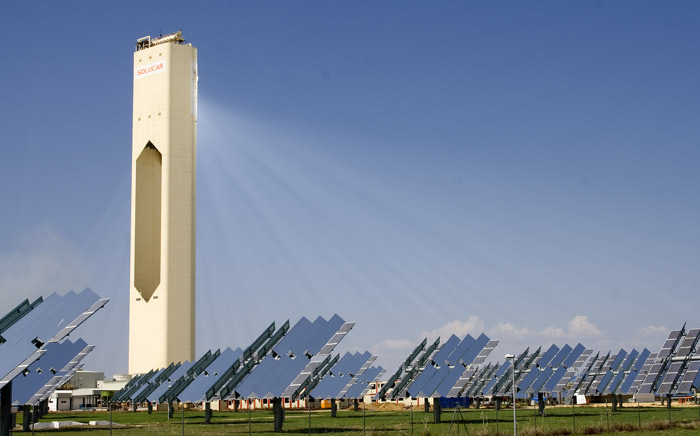
PS10 solar power plant

Years in which the last three renewable power levels achieved
Year of Recording	Renewal Energy Percentage Achievement
2009	10%
2012	15%
2020	20%

Renewable energy includes wind, hydro and solar power, biomass and geothermal energy sources.

Spain has long been a leader in renewable energy, and has recently become the first country in the world to have relied on wind as its top energy source for an entire year. The country is attempting to use wind power to supply 40 percent of its electricity consumption by 2020. At the same time, Spain is also developing other renewable sources of energy, particularly solar photovoltaic.

In 2025, renewable sources generated 55.5% of Spain's electricity, rising to 56.6% when estimated self-consumption is included. Wind was the largest source in the generation mix excluding self-consumption, accounting for 21.6%, followed by nuclear at 19% and solar photovoltaic at 18.4%.

==== Solar power ====
In 2013, solar accounted for 3.1 percent of Spain's total electricity when capacity was 4,638 MW. By 2022 Spain had increased the solar capacity to 19,113 MW.

==== Wind power ====
In 2021, wind power provided 24% of Spain’s total installed power generation capacity and 23% of total power generation. In 2023 it will reach 30 GW of capacity.

==== Biomass ====
Biomass provides around 2% of electricity generation capacity.

=== Nuclear energy ===
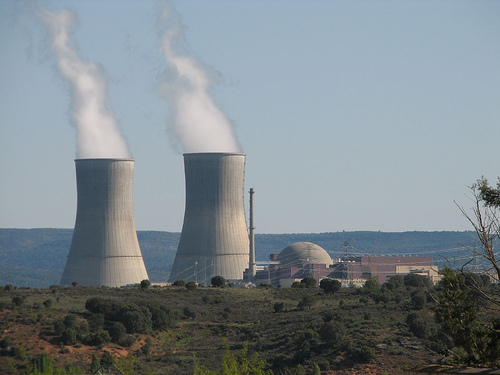
Trillo Nuclear Power Plant

Spain has seven operating nuclear reactors and in 2022 they generated 20.25% of the country’s electricity.

The government’s energy and climate plan specifies that installed nuclear capacity will remain at current levels of about 7,100 MW until at least 2025, and will then reduce to just over 3,000 MW from 2030 onwards.

=== Hydro energy ===
In Spain in 2021 hydro power provided 17% of Spain’s total installed power generation capacity and 11% of total power generation.

Hydropower capacity from 2014 to 2023 (MW)
2014	2015	2016	2017	2018	2019	2020	2021	2022	2023
19,223	20,053	20,080	20,079	20,080	20,114	20,117	20,132	20,137	20,140

Drought impacts electricity production from hydro in the summer months.

== Global warming ==
According to Energy Information Administration the CO_{2} emissions from energy consumption of Spain were in 2009 360 Mt, below Italy 450 Mt and France 429 Mt and above Poland 295 Mt and the Netherlands 250 Mt. The emissions tonnes per capita were in Spain 7.13, Italy 7.01 France 6.3 Poland 7.43, and the Netherlands 14.89.

== See also ==
- Electricity sector in Spain
- 2025 Iberian Peninsula blackout
- List of power stations in Spain
- Ayoluengo oil field
