= Solar power in Portugal =

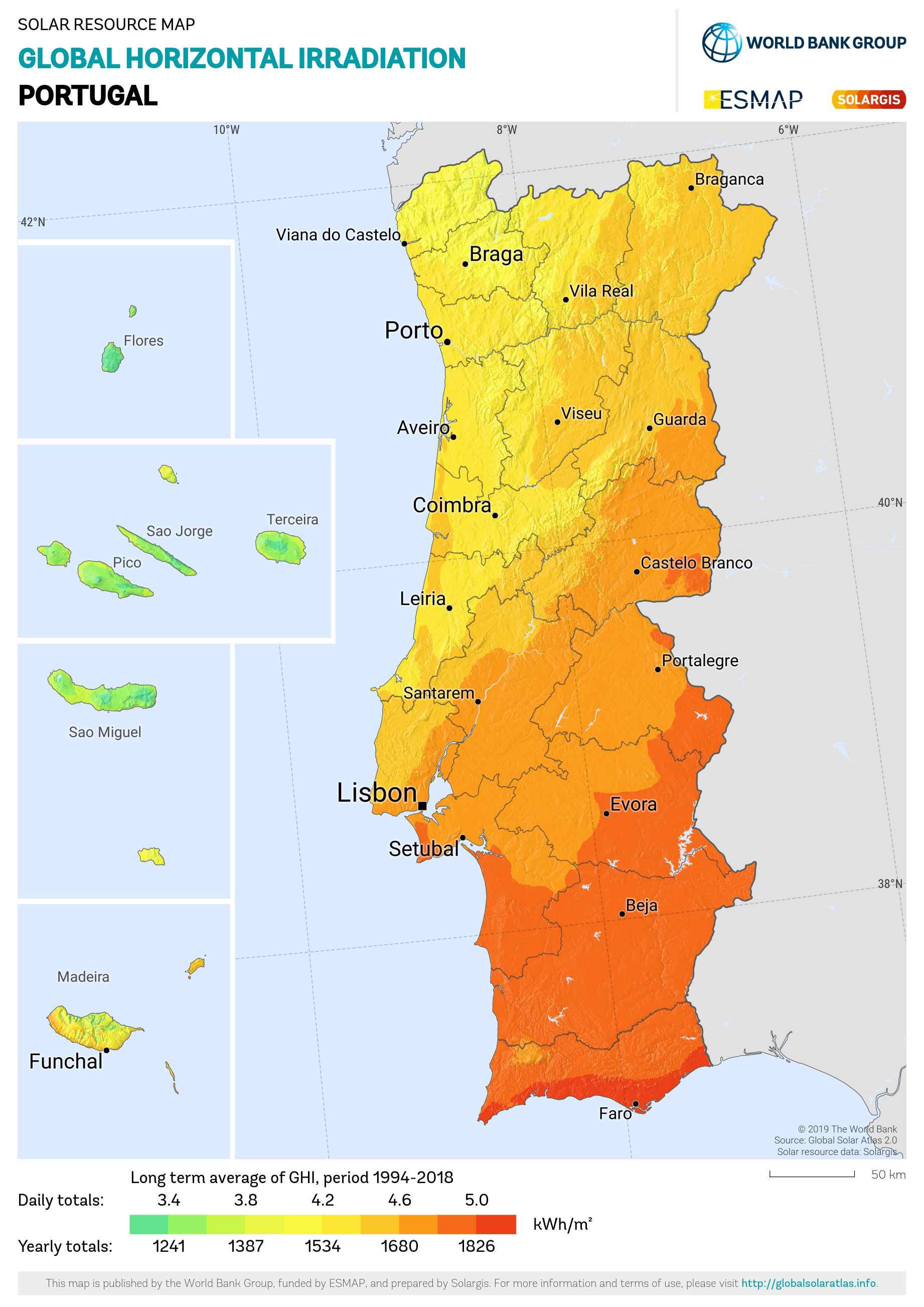
- Solar irradiation map of Portugal
- Installed capacity: 5.81 GW (2024) (28th)
- Annual generation: 6.72 TWh (2024)
- Capacity per capita: 569 W (2024)
- Share of electricity: 14.5% (2024)

Solar power is a growing source in the Portuguese energy mix. Solar power contributes 6.72 TWh of generation to the Portuguese grid, accounting for 14.5% of total electric power generation as of 2024 with 5.81 GW of installed capacity.

Solar power has become an increasingly significant contributor to Portugal’s electricity mix, accounting for around 10% of national electricity consumption in 2024, with record annual additions of approximately 1.7 GW in 2024 alone. In July 2026, renewable energy provided for 53% of national electricity consumption, with 19% of that coming from solar power specifically.

Portugal has set a goal of between 8.1 GW and 9.9 GW in installed capacity by 2030.

== Photovoltaic plants ==
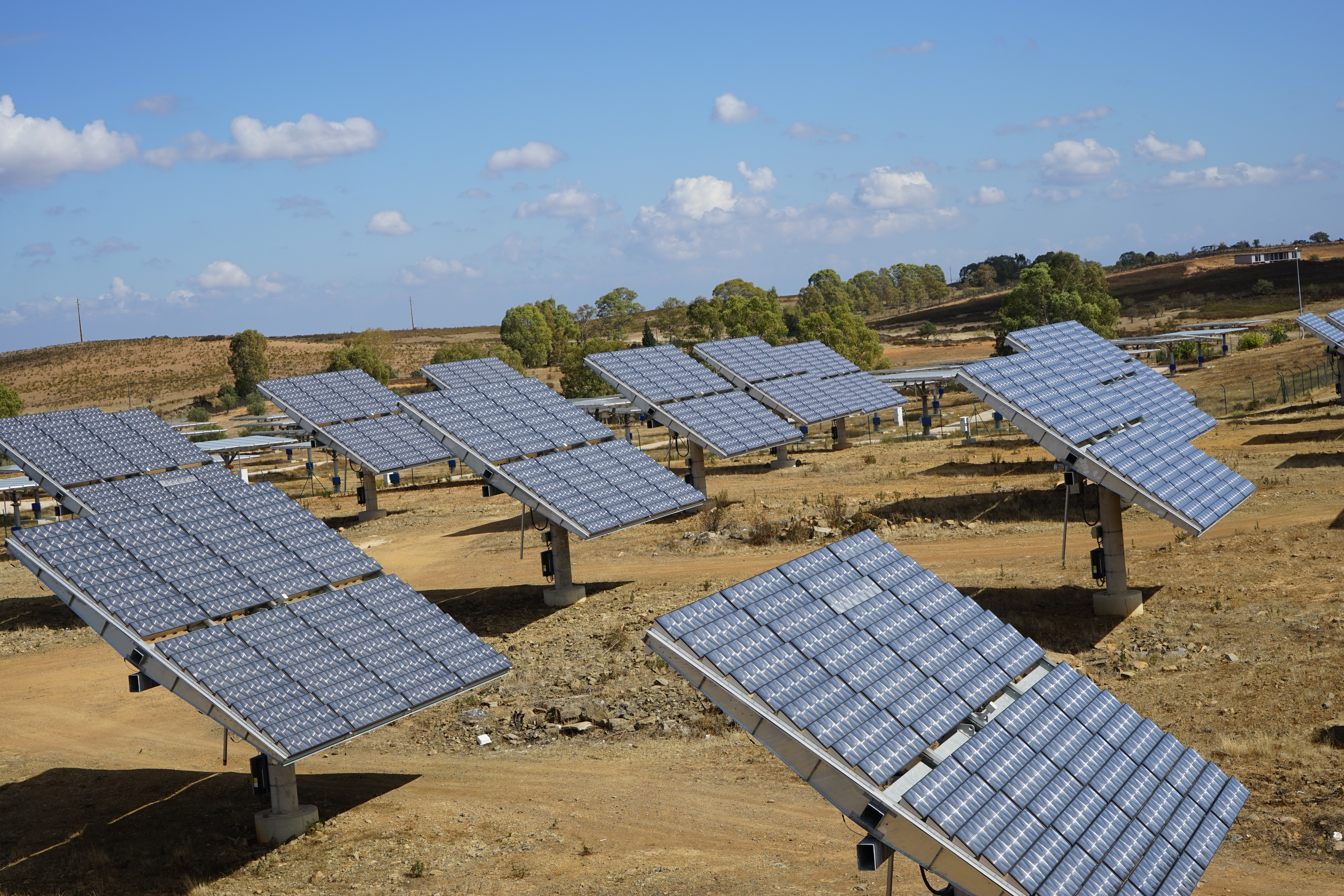
Martim Longo high-concentration PV project, Alcoutim.

The Serpa solar power plant is an 11 megawatt plant covered 150 acres (0.61 km^{2}) and employs 52,000 PV panels. The panels are raised 2 meters off the ground thus allowing grazing to continue. The plant provides enough energy for 8,000 homes and saves an estimated 30,000 tonnes of carbon dioxide emissions per year.

On 9 October 2021, the largest solar power plant in Portugal, Ricardo Totta (also known as Solara4), was inaugurated in Alcoutim. With an installed capacity of 219 MW, the power plant has 661,500 solar panels and can power the needs of 200,000 homes. It occupies an area of 320 hectares and will prevent the emission of 326,000 tons of carbon dioxide every year. It surpassed the 62 MW Moura Photovoltaic Power Station.

Between December 2025 and May 2026, Portugal installed 372 MW of solar power.

== Fast-tracking solar PV ==
Amid the economic challenges posed by Covid-19, Portugal announced a EUR 9.2 billion stimulus package in March 2020. This encompassed various measures, including expediting permits and grid connections for 220 solar photovoltaic (PV) projects. The primary goal was to stimulate economic recovery, create jobs in renewables, and enhance the country's solar capacity. Additionally, these initiatives aligned with Portugal's commitment to reduce fossil fuel dependence and advance decarbonization.

== Recent and future auctions ==
In 2019, a competitive auction for a new PV plant saw a worldwide record low bid of €14.76 per MWh, well below other generating technologies. The auction awarded 1.150 MW of solar capacity to various companies, significantly more than the total installed capacity at the time. A 2020 auction saw a price of €11.16 per MWh.

Solar power interest is growing exponentially in Portugal. João Galamba, the State Secretary for Energy, announced that more solar auctions would take place, including one in the second quarter of 2020 as well as that there were over 80,000 MW (80 GW) in projects awaiting analysis and approval.

Another solar auction was set to launch between October 2021 and November 2021. A total of 400 MW in floating solar power at dam reservoirs was to be auctioned.

== Rooftop solar ==
In addition to tenders for large scale power plants, Portugal has set a framework for the installation of small scale rooftop solar installations which came into force in January 2020.

== Floating solar power ==
In November 2016, an EDP Group pilot-project of 840 solar panels with a total capacity of 200 kWp began to produce power on the reservoir of the Alto Rabagão Dam with an annual production of 300 MWh.

At the end of 2021, a floating solar power project at the Alqueva Dam reservoir is set to begin production. 12,000 solar panels with a total capacity of 4 MW will produce 7 GWh of power annually.

== Total installed photovoltaics ==
Solar PV deployment in Portugal. Capacity in megawatts (MW_{p}).

Total capacity installed and generation
Year	Total capacity in MW_{p}	Generation in GWh_{p}	Capacity factor in per cent
2005	3.0	n.a.	n.a.
2006	3.4	n.a.	n.a.
2007	17.9	n.a.	n.a.
2008	68.0	n.a.	n.a.
2009	102.2	160	17.9
2010	130.8	213	18.6
2011	143.6	277	22.0
2012	228.8	360	18.0
2013	277.9	437	18.0
2014	419.0	631	17.2
2015	450	800	20.3
2016	550	870	18.1
2017	620	990	18.2
2018	720	1010	16.0
2019	970	1340	15.8
2020	1190	1720	16.5
2021	1820	2240	14.1
2022	2820	3520	14.3
2023	4040	5160	14.6
2024	5810	6720	13.2
2025	6949	n.a.	n.a.
Source: IRENA, 2025, Photovoltaic Barometer, March 2015, previous, Ember

== See also ==
- Renewable energy in Portugal
- Wind power in Portugal
- Geothermal power in Portugal
- List of renewable energy topics by country
- Renewable energy in the European Union
