= Wind power in Portugal =

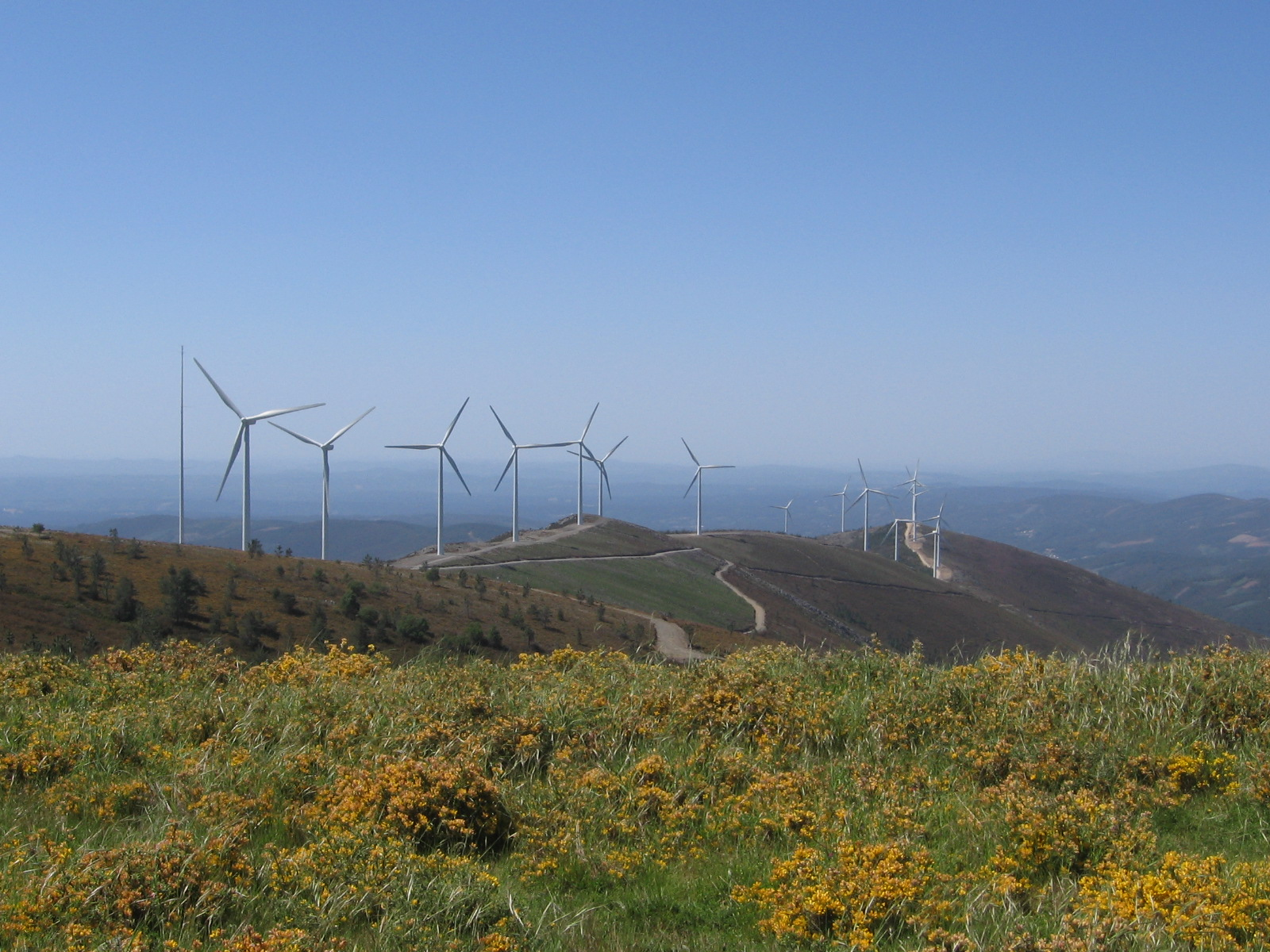
Wind farm at Lousã

Wind power installed capacity and generation in Portugal

Wind power is a major source of energy in Portugal. At the end of 2020, wind power capacity in Continental Portugal was 5,456 MW. In 2020, wind power represented 23.7% of total electricity generation.

The record of wind power generation was achieved on November 22, 2019, with 103.1 GWh produced.

== History ==
Wind power nameplate capacity in Portugal since 2000
Year	MW
2000	100
2001	131
2002	195
2003	296
2004	522
2005	1,022
2006	1,590
2007	2,413
2008	3,187
2009	3,590
2010	4,038
2011	4,379
2012	4,525
2013	4,724
2014	4,922
2015	4,922
2016	5,033
2017	5,313
2018	5,368
2019	
2020	5,456
2021	5,628

In 1995 the law in Portugal was changed to permit wind energy to access the electricity grid. A 1999 change to the feed in tariff encouraged development, the tariff has been changed several times since then.

In 2013, Portugal installed 196 MW of wind power. In 2015, the MW of wind power didn't change in comparison with 2014, remaining at 4922,88 MW.

At the end of 2020, wind power capacity in Continental Portugal was 5,456 MW.

== Regional trends ==
Installed windpower capacity (MW)
Rank	District	2008	2009	2013
1	Viseu	635.3	651.3	934.5
2	Coimbra	302.8	449.8	599.5
3	Vila Real	156.7	270.7	589.9
4	Castelo Branco	386.5	430.5	462.1
5	Lisboa	273.9	313.5	358.6
6	Viana do Castelo	308.8	356.0	342.6
7	Guarda	115.3	162.5	343.0
8	Leiria	172.9	252.3	272.6
9	Faro	75.0	135.0	209.2
10	Braga	121.0	147.9	148.3
11	Santarém	103.9	103.9	125.9
12	Porto	73.7	80.0	79.1
13	Bragança	14.0	74.0	74.0
14	Beja	10.0	26.0	50.0
15	Madeira	8.7	26.6	46.2
16	Aveiro	42.1	42.1	42.1
17	Açores	11.6	11.6	32.4
18	Setúbal	18.7	18.7	18.7
19	Évora	0.0	0.0	0.0
20	Portalegre	0.0	0.0	0.0
	Portugal total (MW)	2832	3535	4731

Most of the Portuguese wind capacity is located in the north-northeast distritos. Viseu is the distrito with the largest installed capacity, followed by Coimbra, Vila Real and Castelo Branco.

== Major wind farms ==
The 240 MW Alto Minho Wind Farm in the Viana do Castelo district became fully operational in November, 2008 when Portugal's Economy Minister Manuel Pinho inaugurated it. At the time of completion it was Europe's largest on-shore wind farm. The wind farm began generating electricity in 2007, with production increasing as more wind turbines came online, reflecting the modular nature of wind farms. The wind farm consists of 68 Enercon E-82 2MW wind turbines and 52 Enercon E-70 E4 2MW turbines, totaling 136 MW and 104 MW, respectively. The wind farm will produce 552 GWh annually, avoiding 370,000 tonnes of carbon dioxide emissions.

Other major wind farms include Arada-Montemuro Wind Farm (112 MW), Gardunha Wind Farm (106 MW), Pinhal Interior Wind Farm (144 MW), Ventominho Wind Farm (240 MW).

Other wind farms include the Pampilhosa Wind Farm (114 MW), which uses Vestas V90 turbines; the Caramulo Wind Farm, with a capacity of 90 MW, using Enercon E-70 E4 and E82/2000 turbines; and the Candeeiros Wind Farm, with a capacity of 111 MW, using Vestas V90 turbines.

== Offshore wind power ==
Portugal had a 2 MW experimental offshore windfarm in the floating wind turbine WindFloat near the Aguçadoura Wave Farm in Póvoa de Varzim. It achieved successful testing. It was transferred to Viana do Castelo in 2016 with planned expansion, and was renamed Windfloat Atlantic. The Póvoa de Varzim site will foster a new technology.

This experimental wind farm was replaced by a commercial grade wind farm by the very same company, using 3 wind generators from Vestas model V164, for a total of roughly 25MW, operating since July 2020.

== See also ==
- List of large wind farms
- Renewable energy in the European Union
- Renewable energy in Portugal
- Solar power in Portugal
- Geothermal power in Portugal
- Renewable energy by country
- Renewable energy commercialization
