= Alto Minho Wind Farm =

Wind farm in Portugal

- Country: Portugal
- Coordinates: 42°01′44″N 8°23′31″W

The Alto Minho Wind Farm in the Viana do Castelo district, of Portugal, became fully operational in November 2008, when Portugal's Economy Minister Manuel Pinho inaugurated it. At the time of completion, it was Europe's largest on-shore wind farm. The wind farm began generating electricity in 2007, with production increasing as more wind turbines came online, reflecting the modular nature of wind farms. The wind farm consists of 68 Enercon E-82 2MW wind turbines and 52 Enercon E-70 E4 2MW turbines, totaling 136 MW and 104 MW, respectively, for a grand total of 240 MW of nameplate capacity. The wind farm will produce 530 GWh annually, avoiding 370,000 tonnes (410,000 tons) of carbon dioxide emissions.

In December 2013, there were 4731 MW of Wind Power installed and operational in Portugal.

== See also ==
- Renewable energy in Portugal
- Wind power in Portugal
