= Trillo =

Trillo may refer to:

- Trillo, Italian for Trill (music), a musical ornament
  - In 17th century Italy "trillo" denotes the so-called 'Monteverdi trill' or 'goat's trill', a tremolo-like repetition of a single pitch, the term "gruppo" being used for the modern trill or shake.
- Trillo, a threshing-board used in some Spanish-speaking countries
- Trillo (Guadalajara), town in Spain with nearby Trillo Nuclear Power Plant

== People ==
- St. Trillo, 6th century Breton missionary to Wales after whom Llandrillo (Denbighshire) and Llandrillo yn Rhos are named
- John Trillo ( 1915 –1992), bishop of the Church of England
- Carlos Trillo (1943 – 2011), Argentine comic book writer
- Manny Trillo (b. 1950), former Major League Baseball second baseman
- Federico Trillo, former Minister of Defence of Spain
- Dennis Trillo (b. 1981), Filipino actor and star of My Husband's Lover
