= Lemoiz =

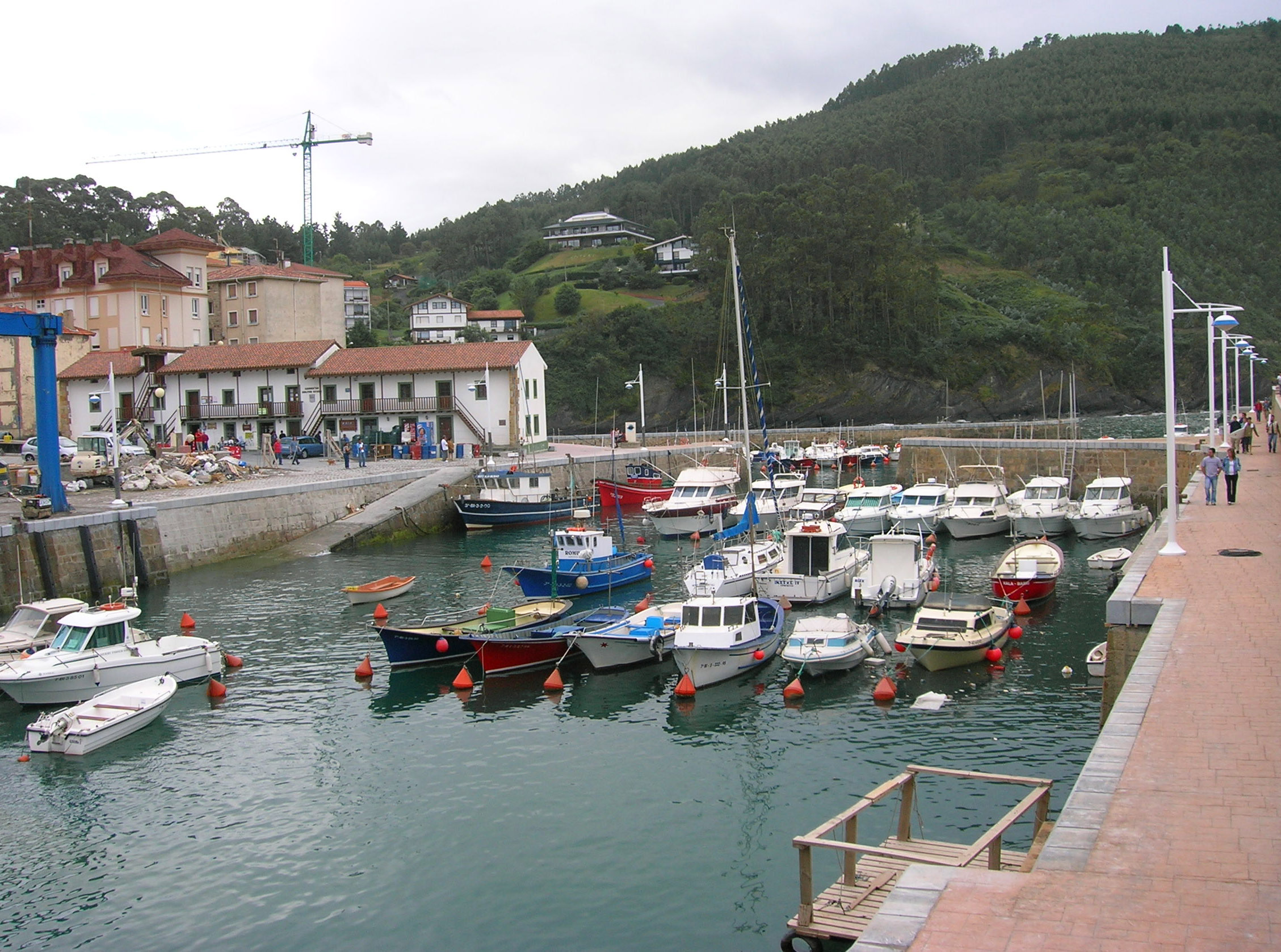
- The fishing port of Armintza

- Flag Coat of arms

- Location of Lemoiz within the Basque Country
- Coordinates: 43°24′41″N 2°54′8″W
- Country: Spain
- Autonomous community: Biscay

Area
  - Total: 13.40 km^{2} (5.17 sq mi)
- Elevation: 89 m (292 ft)

Population (2025-01-01)
  - Total: 1,347
  - Density: 100.5/km^{2} (260.4/sq mi)
- Time zone: UTC+1 (CET)
  - Summer (DST): UTC+2 (CEST)
- Website: www.lemoiz.net

Lemoiz (Spanish: Lemóniz) is a town and municipality located in the province of Biscay, in the autonomous community of Basque Country, northern Spain. It has a population of about 1243.

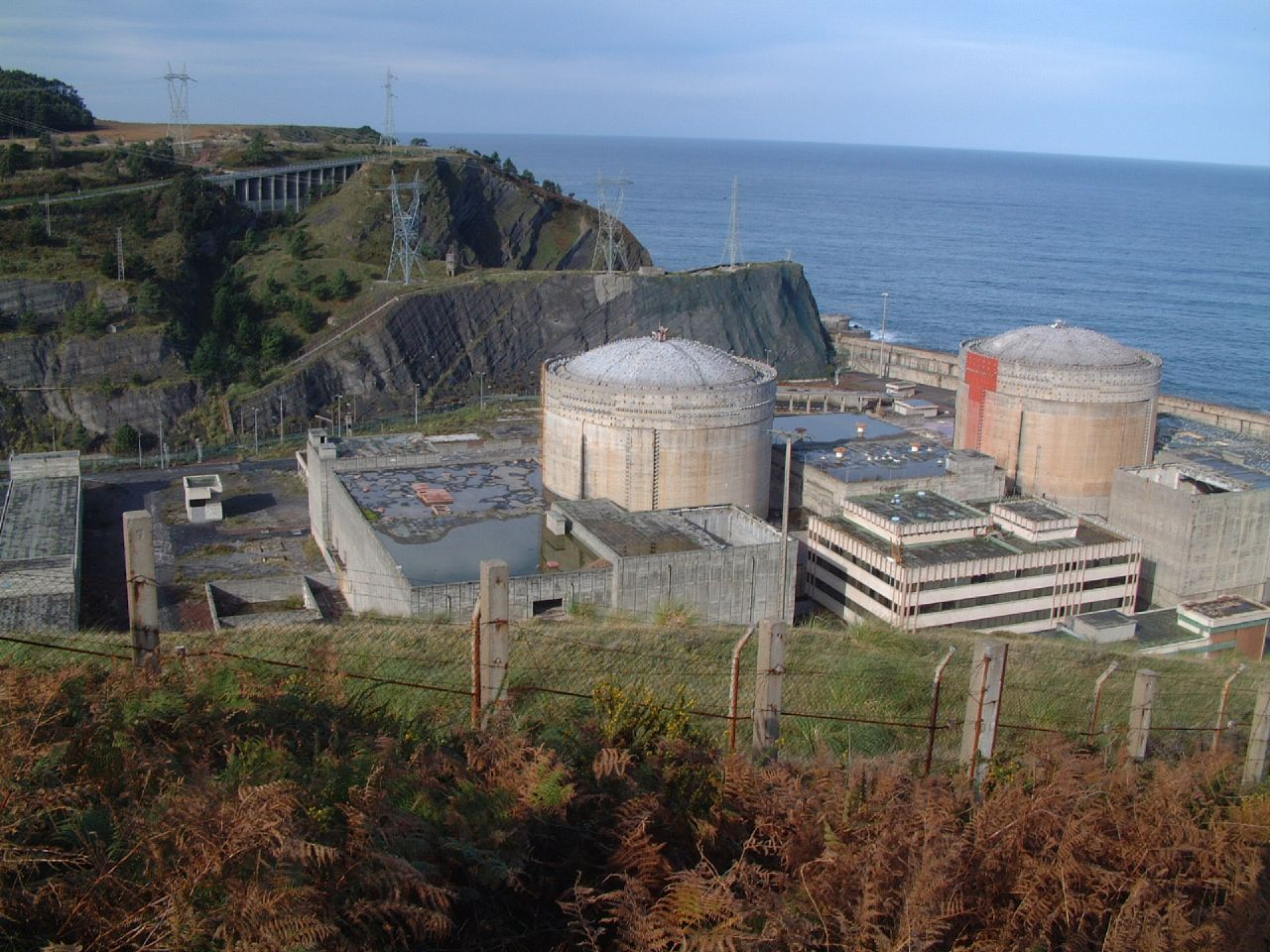
The unfinished power plant.

It was chosen as the site of the Lemoniz Nuclear Power Plant, but the construction was left unfinished after ecologist opposition and ETA attacks.
