= Lemóniz Nuclear Power Plant =

Unfinished nuclear power plant in Basque

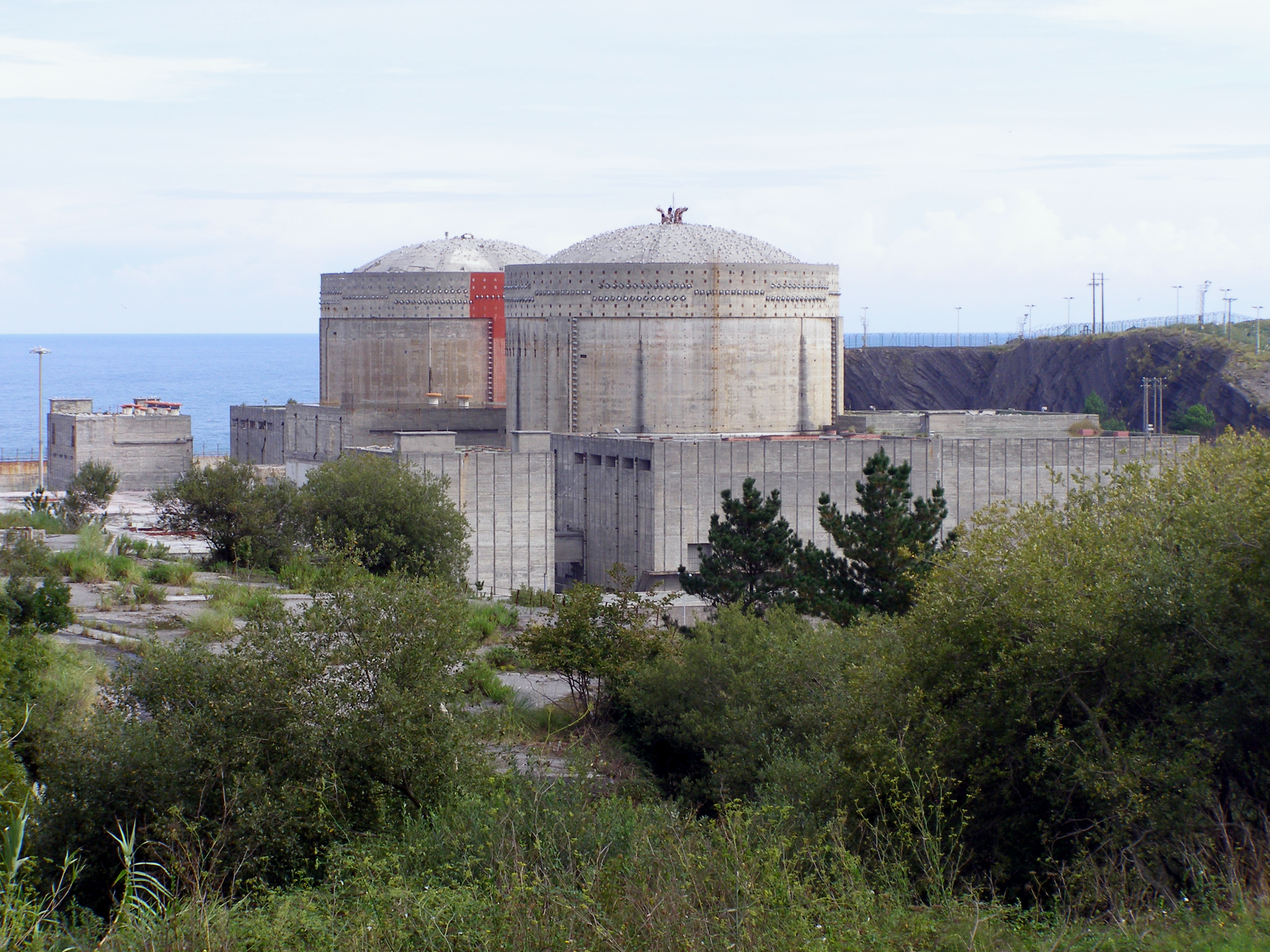
- Lemóniz NPP
- Country: Spain
- Coordinates: 43°26′0″N 2°52′21″W
- Status: Decommissioned
- Decommission date: 1 April 1984
- Owner: Basque Government

Power generation
- Units under const.: 2 x 900 MWe (stopped)

External links
- Commons: Related media on Commons

Lemóniz Nuclear Power Plant is an unfinished nuclear power plant in Lemoiz, in the Basque province of Bizkaia, Spain. Its construction stopped in 1983 when the Spanish nuclear power expansion program was cancelled following a change of government. Its two PWRs, each of 900 MWe, were almost complete but were never operated.

Conflict concerning the Lemóniz Nuclear Power Plant was one of the major anti-nuclear issues in the 1970s and 1980s in Spain. It faced major opposition from the Basque anti-nuclear movement and the Basque armed separatist organization ETA.

== ETA response ==
The building of the power station was opposed by ETA, a Basque separatist organisation proscribed as a terrorist group by the Spanish government. The first attack on the site took place on 18 December 1977, when an ETA commando unit attacked a Guardia Civil post guarding the station. One of the cell members, David Álvarez Peña, was wounded in the attack and died a month later. On 17 March 1978, ETA planted a bomb in the reactor of the station, causing the death of two workers (Andrés Guerra and Alberto Negro), and wounded another two. The explosion also caused substantial material damage to the facility, which set back construction.

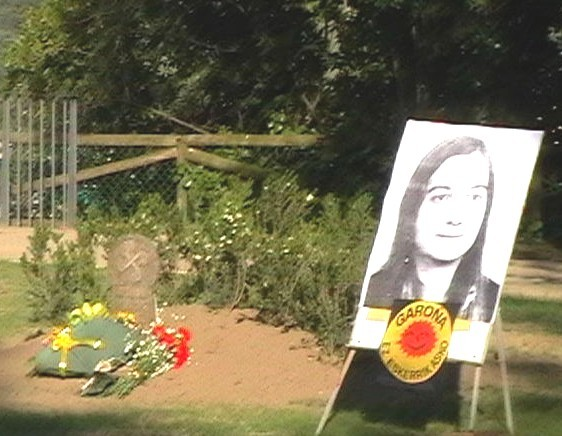
Gladys del Estal, anti-nuclear activist killed during the construction of the station.

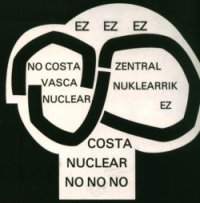
Logo created by the sculptor Chillida against the Lemóniz Nuclear Power Plant.

On 3 June 1979, the anti-nuclear activist Gladys del Estal from San Sebastián died after being hit by a bullet from the police force Guardia Civil during a demonstration in Tudela (Navarre) on the international day of action against nuclear power. Ten days later, on 13 June, ETA managed to get another bomb into the works on the facility, this time in the turbine area. The explosion caused the death of another worker, Ángel Baños. Meanwhile, numerous demonstrations, activities and festivals attended by thousands were being held across the southern Basque Country by ecologists and left leaning groups to demand the closure of the station.

The escalation of ETA's actions came to a head on 29 January 1981, when they kidnapped the chief engineer of the power station, José María Ryan, from Bilbao. Although a large demonstration was held in Bilbao for the release of the engineer, ETA killed Ryan after a week passed, causing an outcry and the first anti-ETA strike. However, by February 1982, a combination of factors brought construction to a halt. Stumbling blocks included popular doubts over the plant's safety and the interests behind it, ETA's violent action, and differing approaches of the Spanish and Basque autonomous government.

In May 1982 ETA assassinated Ángel Pascual, who had taken over the responsibilities from Ryan as chief project engineer. Following the 1982 Spanish general election of a PSOE government, in 1984 a moratorium on new nuclear power plants was put in place for the whole country, affecting Lemóniz as well, which at that point was virtually ready to run. The moratorium put an official end to the project.

== See also ==
- Nuclear power in Spain
