= José Cabrera Nuclear Power Station =

Nuclear power station in Almonacid de Zorita, Spain

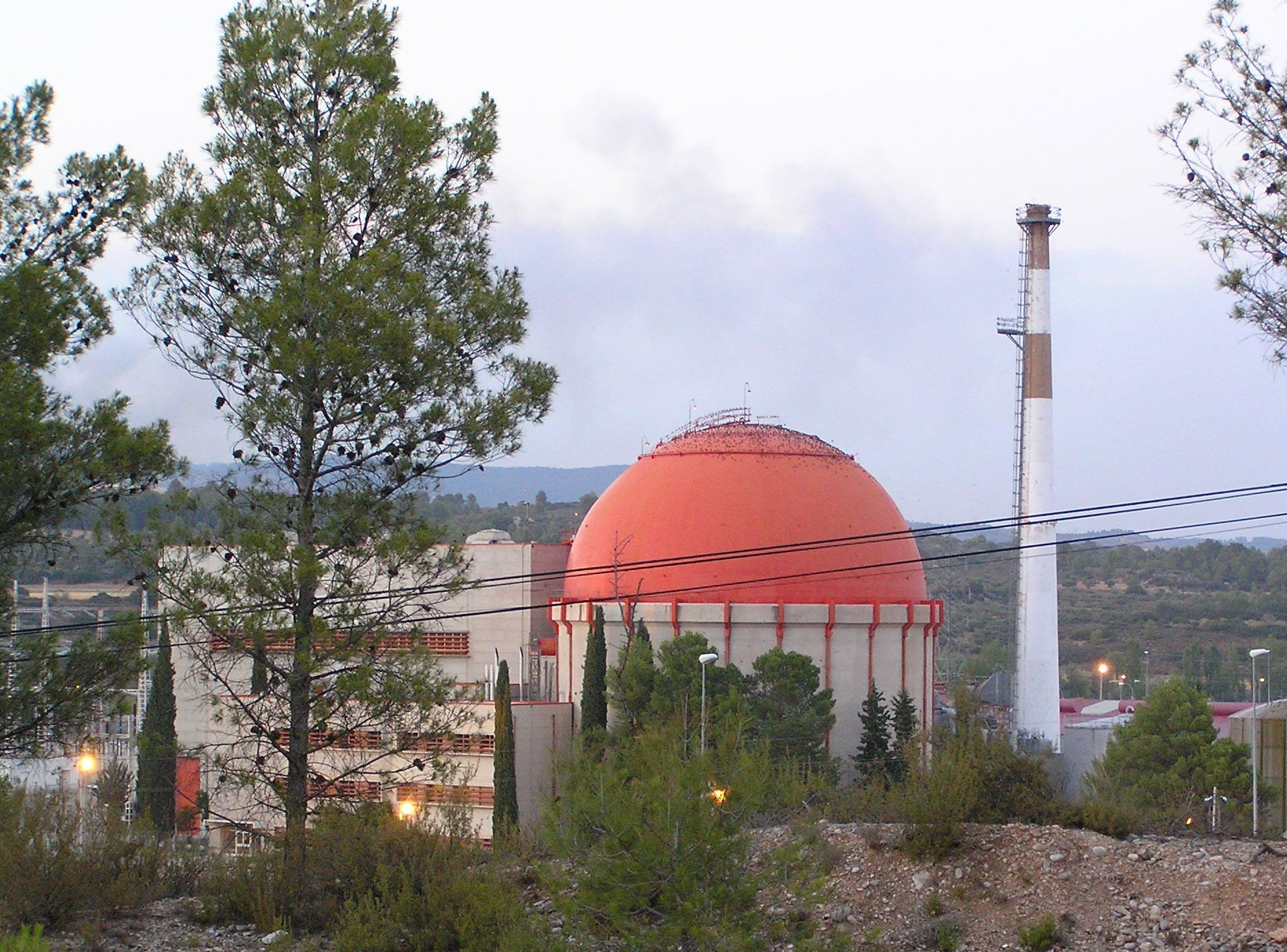
- Zorita NPP
- Country: Spain
- Coordinates: 40°20′57″N 2°53′4″W
- Status: Decommissioned
- Construction began: 1964
- Commission date: August 13, 1969
- Decommission date: April 30, 2006
- Owner: Enresa
- Operators: Union Electrica Fenosa, S.A.

Power generation
- Units decommissioned: 1 x 150 MW
- Nameplate capacity: 160 MW
- Annual net output: 952 GWh

External links
- Commons: Related media on Commons

The José Cabrera Nuclear Power Station (also known as Zorita) was a nuclear power station in Almonacid de Zorita, 70 kilometres (43 mi) east of Madrid, Spain.

The power plant consisted of one single-loop PWR of 160 MWe, built by Zachry Construction Corporation for the Westinghouse Electric Company. It was operated by Unión Fenosa.

== History ==
Construction of the power station started in 1964. It was commissioned in 1968 to Zachry Construction Corporation, and it operated from 1968 until 2006. In 2006, it was closed by ministerial order.

On 11 February 2010, Unión Fenosa transferred the site's ownership to Enresa, a Spanish company responsible for decommissioning the power station. Enresa planned to clear the site by the end of 2015.

In 2010, Westinghouse won a contract to dismantle the reactor internals, and another contract in 2013 to dismantle the reactor pressure vessel. In November 2019, dismantling of the containment building began, and by June 2022 the turbine building was also dismantled. By September 2023, the containment building void was filled with 9,500 cubic metres (340,000 cu ft) of soil. A final phase of site clean-up and testing will be carried out before declaration of the end of decommissioning.

== 2003 incident ==
The Spanish Nuclear Safety Council has investigated the plant's deficient safety system and a missing screw that prevented the reactor from resuming operations after a month-long refueling operation in December 2003.

== See also ==
- List of commercial nuclear reactors
- Nuclear power in Spain
