= ITN (disambiguation) =

ITN is Independent Television News, a British news producer.

ITN may also refer to:

- Independent Television Network, a Sri Lankan broadcaster
- Iran TV Network (Canada)

== Science and technology ==
- Integrated Transport Network, a British map dataset
- Interplanetary Transport Network, a set of gravitational pathways
- TomTom Itinerary file extension (.ITN)

== Other uses ==
- Initial Training Network, Marie Curie Actions research fellowship program
- In the Nursery, a musical group, with the label ITN Corporation
- Insecticide treated net, a type of mosquito net
- Integrated Tactical Network, a US Army network
- Internal Transaction Number
- There Is Such A People (Ima takav narod), Bulgarian political party
