= Gladys del Estal =

Gladys del Estal Ferreño
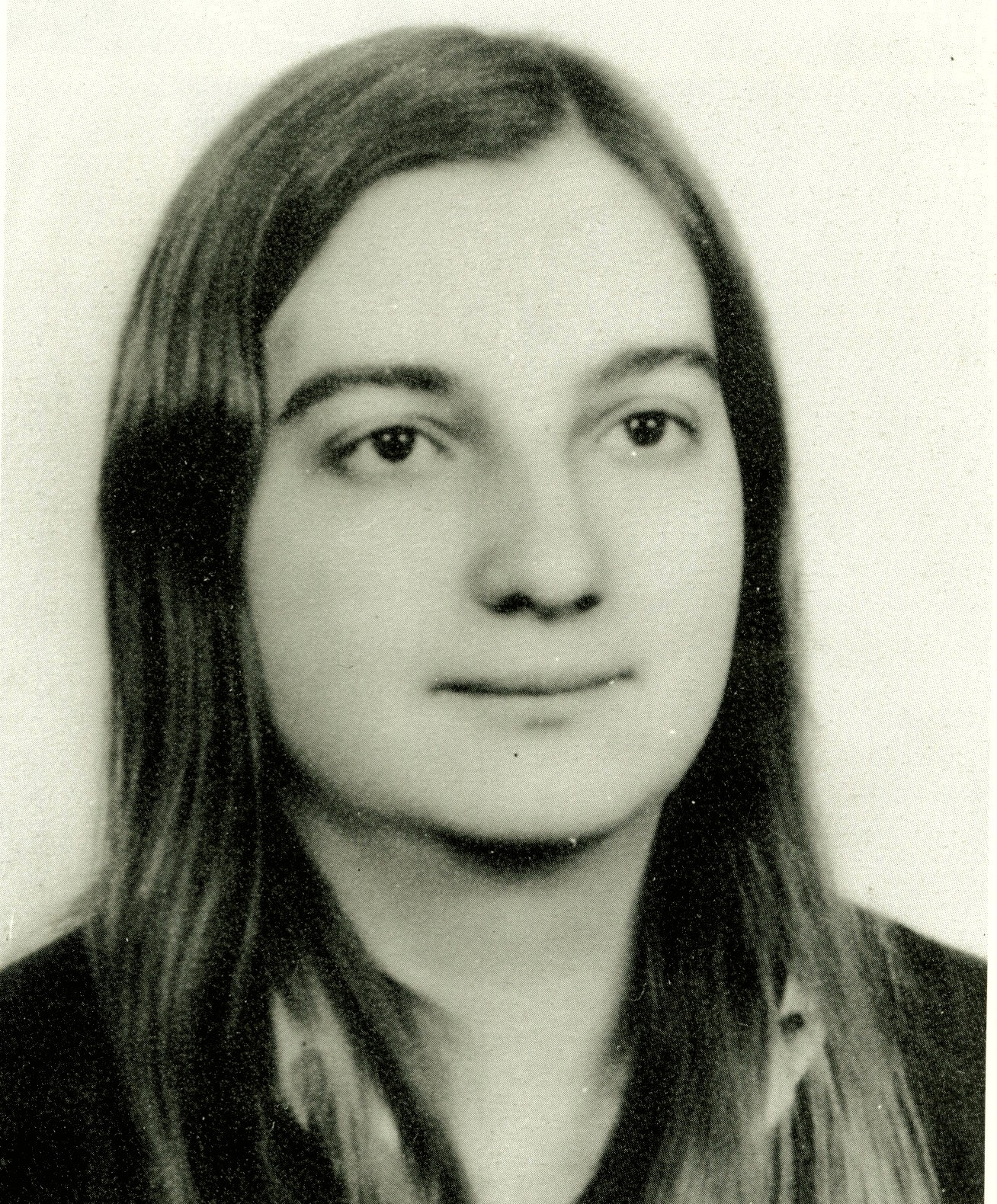
- Born: Gladys del Estal Ferreño; 1956; Caracas, Venezuela
- Died: 3 June 1979 (aged 23); Tudela, Navarre, Spain
- Citizenship: Spain
- Education: University of the Basque Country, 1978
- Occupations: Environmental activist; programmer

Gladys del Estal Ferreño (1956 – 1979) was a Basque environmental activist and programmer from San Sebastián. Killed by the Guardia Civil during an anti-nuclear protest, Del Estal become an important icon of the ecologist movement.

== Biography ==
Gladys del Estal Ferreño was born in 1956 in Caracas, Venezuela to Enrique del Estal Añorga and Eugenia Ferreño. Del Estal's parents were exiled during the Spanish Civil War (1936–1939).

The family later returned to Spain and settled in the district of Egia in San Sebastian. Del Estal was educated at the Colegio Presentación de María and later studied administration at the Centro Cultural Femenino Nazaret. In 1978, Del Estal graduated from the University of the Basque Country with a degree in computer science. and worked as a programmer in a small computers company.

== Death ==
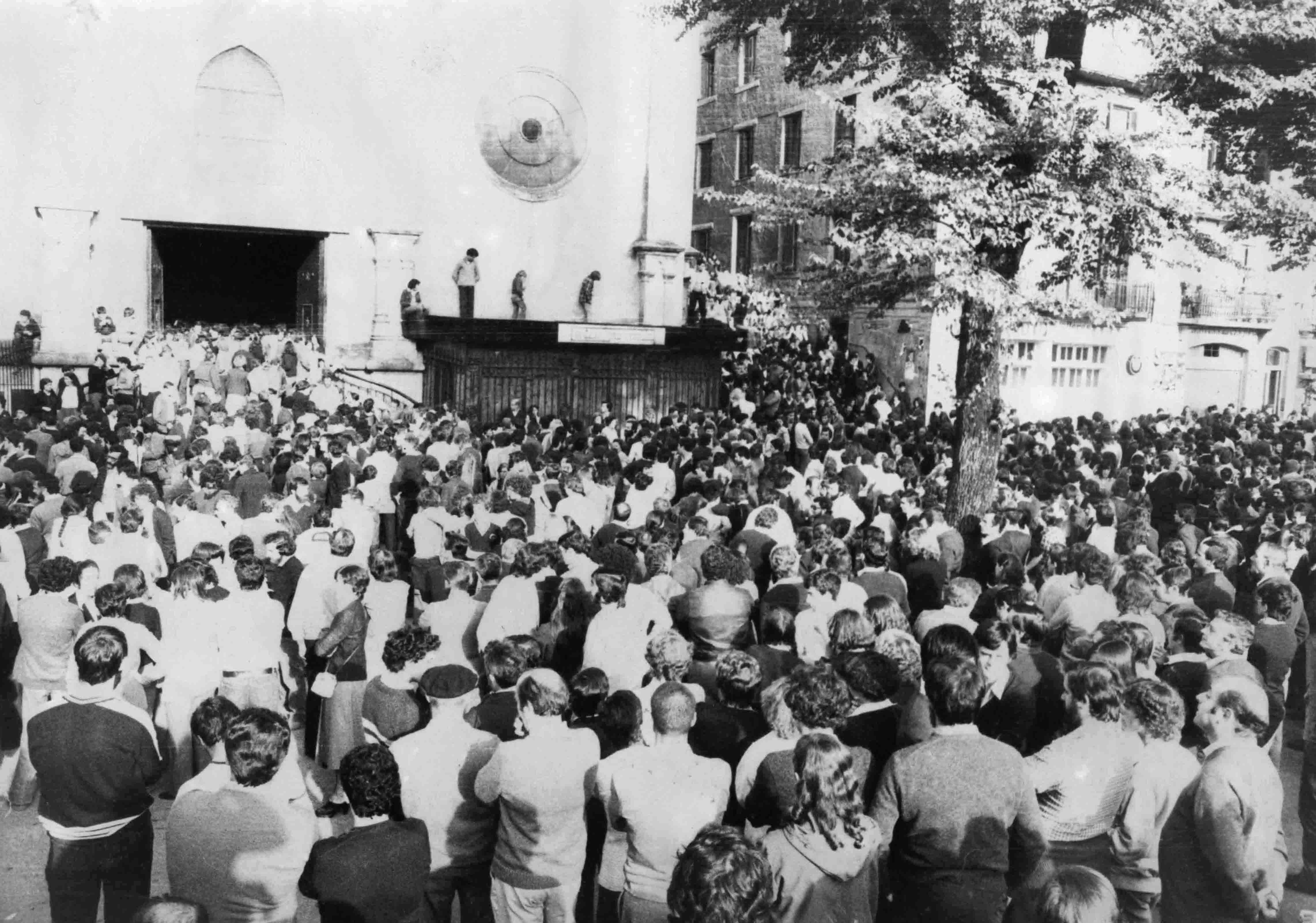
Funeral in Donostia-San Sebastián, attended by a large number of citizens (1979)

The anti-nuclear movement called a protest on 3 June 1979 at Tudela against the Basque Country nuclear station construction program. The protest converged with another against the Bardenas aircraft firing range. The Civil Guard took positions in Tudela and charged against the 4,000 marchers who turned out at the peaceful demonstration. As marchers fled, a number of them decided to sit down at the bridge against repression, with Gladys among them. A Civil Guard squad approach them, and the guardsman José Martinez Salas shot the young activist in the back of the head, causing her immediate death.

The author of the shot was judged, receiving a sentence of 18 months imprisonment in December 1981 for "reckless endangerment", since the tribunal in Pamplona deemed his action was 'unintended'. Just the opposite, fellow ecologist activists who prefer to remain anonymous state that the officer José Martínez Salas would direct an obscene comment at her, for which she insulted him. The officer retorted by shooting at her.

The Civil Guard officer responsible for the murder does not appear to have set foot in prison. Ten years later, he was decorated for his "impeccable behaviour" in Tudela, where Gladys del Estal was killed. Under Spanish premier Felipe González, the shooter was awarded the Cross of Military Merit.

== Memory ==
Tribute act and sing-along in memory of Gladys (2020)

A memorial was erected in remembrance of Gladys del Estal at the site where she was killed one year on; it read Gladys gogoan zaitugu (Basque for "Gladys we hold you in our memory"); still it was removed by the Civil Guard. A demonstration was held where protesters chanted slogans against the power company Iberduero and the police forces, at a time of intense violent activity pursued by ETA, police forces acting beyond official missions, and paramilitary groups. (Note: During this Spanish Transition period, a citizen fell dead every twenty days as a result of police forces acting beyond regular conduct, see The Huffington Post) The organizers planted a Basque flag with a black ribbon. The governmental authority reported the organizers for not sticking to the schedule and showing "punishable slogans and attitudes".

A memorial sculpture by Xabier Laka entitled Tribute to Gladys (Basque: Gladysen omenez) is located in Cristina Enea Park, San Sebastián. 38 years on after her death a tribute was staged at the site of her memorial. A footbridge in the city also bears her name.

== See also ==
- Lemóniz Nuclear Power Plant
- Three Mile Island accident
- Basque conflict
- Spanish transition
