= Ayoluengo oil field =

Oil field in Sargentes de la Lora, Spain

Ayoluengo
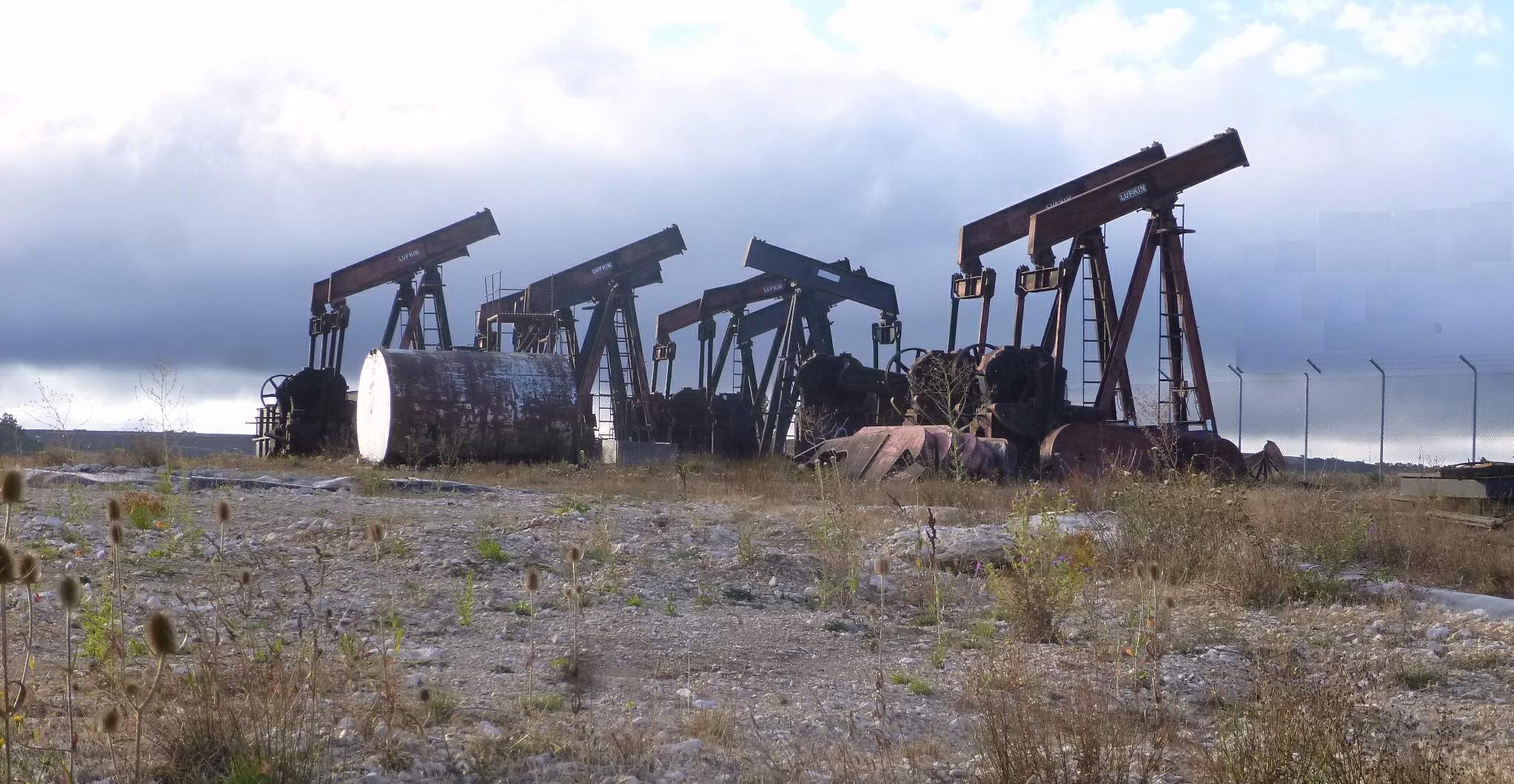
- Fuel treatment facility at the Ayoluengo Oil Field, Burgos (Station 5)
- Country: Spain
- Region: Province of Burgos
- Offshore/onshore: onshore
- Coordinates: 42°44′49″N 3°53′05″W
- Operator: Leni Oil & Gas

Field history
- Discovery: 1964
- Start of development: 1964
- Start of production: 1967
- Abandonment: 2017

Production
- Current production of oil: 150 barrels per day (~7,500 t/a)
- Estimated oil in place: 13.9 million tonnes (~ 16.5×10^{6} m^{3} or 104 million bbl)

The Ayoluengo oil field was an oil field located in Sargentes de la Lora, Province of Burgos. Ayoluengo was the only onshore commercial oil field of Spain (and the only one in the entire Iberian Peninsula).

== History ==
The Ayoluengo oil field was discovered in June 1964 by Amospain (joint venture Chevron, Texaco, Campsa). It was developed by Leni Oil & Gas. It began production in 1967 and produces oil. The total proven reserves of the Ayoluengo oil field are around 104 million barrels (13.9 million tonnes), and production is centered on 225 barrels per day (35.8 m^{3}/d).

The field produced 17 million barrels of oil from 1967 to 2017, year when the concession of the field expired and a new bid was to be organized. The output sometimes peaked at 5,000 barrels a day, but by 2014, it was around 100 barrels a day.

The lands for the oil production were expropriated from the local inhabitants. The region did not benefit economically from the Ayoluengo oil field.

== Geology ==
The 10 km^{2} field consisted of a Triassic salt-cored anticline with 200 m of vertical closure. Oil and gas were produced from more than 50 lenticular sandstone bodies of Late Jurassic to Early Cretaceous age. These sandstone bodies lay at a depth of at least 1300 m. The last well was drilled in 1990, making for a total of 52. Only 10 wells were active by 2016, when the cumulative production had reached 17 million barrels of oil.
