= Energy in Portugal =

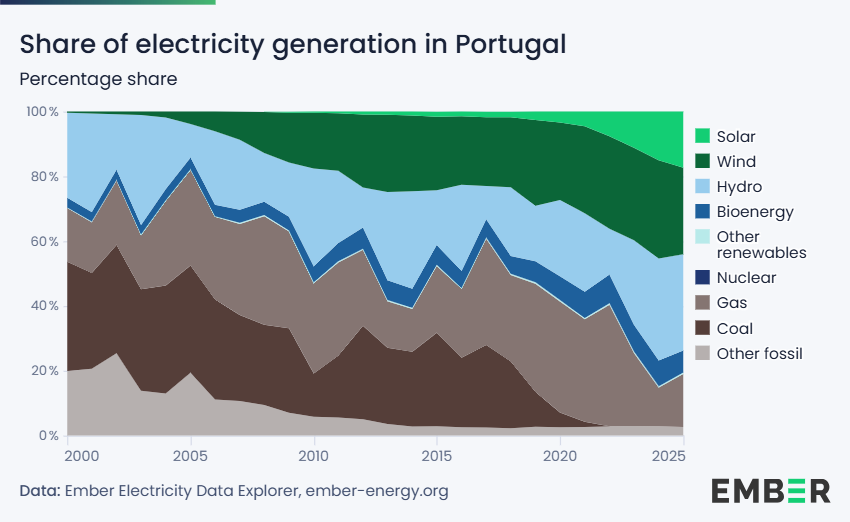
Share of electricity generation in Portugal - percentage share

Portugal electricity production 1980-2019

Energy in Portugal describes energy and electricity production, consumption and import in Portugal. Energy policy of Portugal will describe the politics of Portugal related to energy more in detail. Electricity sector in Portugal is the main article of electricity in Portugal.

In 2000, 85% of energy was imported, while in 2021 the last coal-fired power station closed and renewable energy was expanded to fill the gap. In 2023 Portugal was responsible for around 1% of the total global greenhouse gas emissions. Portugal's aim by 2030 is to cover 80% of its electricity consumption with renewable sources. Portugal has committed to carbon neutrality and net zero by 2050.

== Energy statistics ==
2020 energy statistics

Production capacities for electricity (billion kWh)
| Type | Amount |
|---|---|
| Fossil fuel | 76.40 |
| Hydro | 51.92 |
| Wind power | 45.65 |
| Biomass | 15.08 |
| Solar | 6.27 |
| Geothermal | 0.78 |
| Total | 196.10 |

Electricity (billion kWh)
| Category | Amount |
|---|---|
| Consumption | 48.41 |
| Production | 52.22 |
| Import | 7.55 |
| Export | 6.10 |

Natural Gas (billion m^{3})
| Consumption | 5.94 |
| Import | 6.09 |

Crude Oil (barrels per day)
| Consumption | 90,920,000 |
| Production | 2,920,000 |
| Import | 93,220,000 |

CO_{2} emissions:
38.97 million tons

== Energy plans ==
Portugal aims to be climate neutral by 2050 and to cover 80% of its electricity consumption with renewables by 2030. Portugal has also developed a hydrogen strategy to decrease natural gas imports and reduce greenhouse gas emissions by 2030.

== Greenhouse gas emissions ==
In 2023 Portugal emitted around 339 million tonnes of greenhouse gases (about 5 tonnes per person), equivalent to around 1% of global total emissions. As a EU member state, Portugal is part of their joint plan to reduce emissions by a minimum of 55% by 2030, compared to the level of emissions in 1990. Portugal has committed to carbon neutrality and net zero by 2050. As of 2023, oil made up 44% of Portugal's total energy supply. However the country phased out coal-fired generation in 2021 and has been developing renewable energies such as hydopower and wind power and investing in public transport and electric vehicles.

== Energy sources ==
=== Fossil fuels ===
==== Coal ====
Sines power plant (hard coal) started operation in 1985–1989 in Portugal. According to WWF its CO_{2} emissions were among the top dirty ones in Portugal in 2007. That coal power plant went offline in January 2021, with the one remaining coal power plant in the country, closing at 7h15 on the 19th of November 2021.

==== Natural gas ====
Maghreb–Europe Gas Pipeline (MEG) is a natural gas pipeline, from Algeria through Morocco to Andalusia, Spain.

Portugal has the Sines LNG import terminal to facilitate gas imports. There are three LNG storage tanks with a total capacity of 390,000 cbm and a regasification capacity of 5.6 mtpa. In 2021 Portugal imported 2.8 billion cubic meters of LNG from Nigeria, being almost 50% of the country's gas imports for the year.

=== Renewable energy ===
Portugal's renewable electricity production from 1980 until 2019

Years in which the last three renewable power levels achieved
| Achievement | Year | Achievement | Year | Achievement | Year |
|---|---|---|---|---|---|
| 20% | 2006 | 25% | 2010 | 30% | 2020 |

Renewable energy includes wind, solar, biomass and geothermal energy sources.

In 2025, renewable electricity generation in Portugal reached a record 37 TWh and supplied 68% of national electricity consumption. Hydropower accounted for 27% of consumption, wind power for 25%, solar power for 11% and biomass for 5%.

==== Solar power ====
Portugal has supported and increased the solar electricity (Photovoltaic power) and solar thermal energy (solar heating) during 2006–2010. Portugal was 9th in solar heating in the EU and 8th in solar power based on total volume in 2010.

==== Wind power ====
Wind energy capacity in Portugal is over 5,000 MW from onshore wind farms. In 2023, plans for the first floating offshore wind farm were announced.

==== Biomass ====
Biomass provides around 8% of electricity generation capacity.

=== Hydro power ===
Portugal has also been using water power to generate power for the country. In the 2010s, a local company, Wave Roller installed many devices along the coast to make use of the water power.

In 2021, 36% of Portugal’s total installed power generation capacity and 23% of total power generation came from hydro power.

Drought can seriously reduce hydro energy generation in the summer months.

=== Nuclear power ===
Portugal does not produce any electricity from nuclear sources.

== Transport ==
The sustainable strategy has been a shift from individual to collective transport within the Lisbon Metropolitan Area (Metro Lisbon (ML), collective buses, Companhia Carris de ferro de Lisboa).

== See also ==
- Renewable energy in Portugal
