= Trillo Nuclear Power Plant =

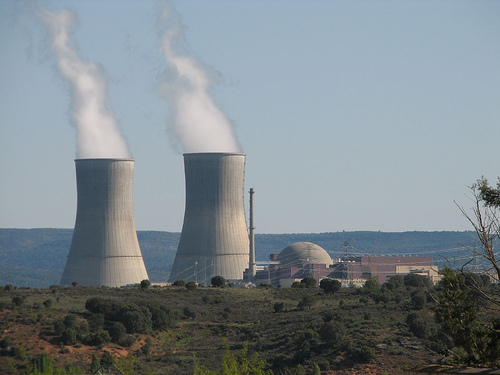
- Country: Spain
- Coordinates: 40°42′4″N 2°37′19″W
- Status: Operational
- Commission date: 1988
- Owner: Iberdrola (48%)
- Operator: CNAT

Nuclear power station
- Reactor type: PWR

Power generation
- Units operational: 1 × 1003 MW
- Nameplate capacity: 1,003 MW

External links
- Website: www.cnat.es/trillo-presentacion.php
- Commons: Related media on Commons

Trillo Nuclear Power Plant is a nuclear power station in Spain.

It was designed by Siemens for a cost of 280,000 million pesetas. It consists of one pressurized water reactor (PWR) of 1066 MWe. Construction of unit one began in 1979, after Unión Eléctrica (now Unión Fenosa) was permitted to build the plant. The first criticality was on 14 May 1988.

A planned second identical unit was cancelled soon after construction began following a change of government in 1983.

It is mainly owned by Iberdrola (49%) and Naturgy (34.5%).

== See also ==
- Nuclear power in Spain
