= Renewable energy in Portugal =

Portugal's renewable electricity production from 1980 until 2019

Renewable energy in Portugal was the source for 25.7% of total energy consumption in 2013. In 2014, 27% of Portugal's energy needs were supplied by renewable sources. In 2016, 28% of final energy consumption in Portugal came from renewable sources.

Portugal aims to be climate neutral by 2050 and to cover 80% of its electricity consumption with renewables by 2030.

In 2018, Portugal committed to close all of the country's coal producing facilities by 2030, making it almost completely reliant on renewable energy in the coming years. As of 2019, coal still provided 40% of Portugal's electricity needs. The last Portuguese coal power plant closed on 19 November 2021.

== Development ==
During February 2016, an equivalent to 95% of electricity consumed in Portugal was produced by renewable sources such as biomass, hydropower, wind power and solar power. A total of 4139 GWh was produced by these sources. In May 2016, all of Portugal's electricity was produced renewably for a period of over four days, a landmark achievement for a modern European country.

The renewable energy produced in Portugal fell from 55.5% of the total electricity produced in 2016 to 41.8% in 2017, due to the drought of 2017, which severely affected the production of hydro electricity. The sources of the renewable energy produced in Portugal in 2017 were wind power with 21.6% of the total (up from 20.7% in 2016), hydro power with 13.3% (down from 28.1% in 2016), bioenergy with 5.1% (same as in 2016), solar power with 1.6% (up from 1.4% in 2016), geothermal energy with 0.4% (up from 0.3% in 2016) and a small amount of wave power in the Azores. 24% of the energy produced in the Azores is geothermal.

On July 14, 2020, EDP announced it would be closing the country's largest coal-fired power station, in Sines, by January 2021. In effect, Sines's power plant was closed on 15 January 2021, nearly ten years earlier than initially forecasted. The plant was responsible for 12% of all greenhouse emissions in Portugal, and its closure meant the biggest decrease in polluting emissions in the country's history. The Pego coal plant was the only coal-fired facility functioning until 19 November 2021 when it too was shut down.

It is estimated that around 20,000 jobs will be created until 2030 in the solar-photovoltaic industry alone, with EDP having announced an investment of 24 billion Euros in the renewable industry until 2026, mostly directed at wind, solar and green hydrogen production.

== Hydro power ==
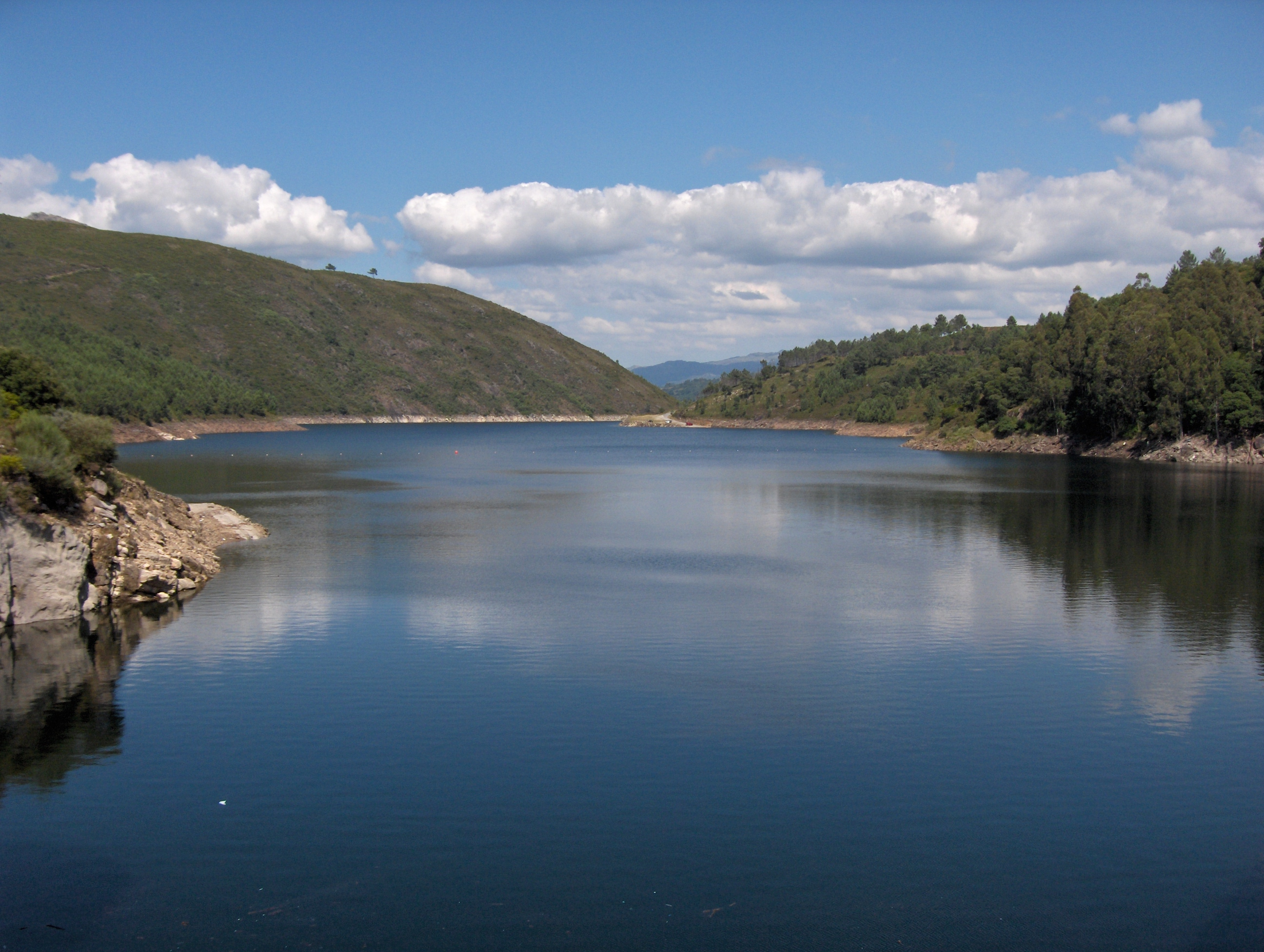
Alto Lindoso dam, serving the largest hydroelectric power station in the country

As of 2020, hydroelectricity accounted for 28% of the total amount of electricity produced in Portugal from renewable sources.

The largest hydroelectric power station is at the Alto Lindoso dam, with a capacity of 630 MW. Portugal has about 100 small hydro systems, with a capacity of 256 MW, which produce 815 GWh/year.

== Wind power ==
At the end of 2018, wind power capacity in Continental Portugal was 5,368 MW. In 2020, wind powered energy was responsible for 24% of electricity production.

Portugal combines wind and hydropower by using nighttime winds to pump water uphill and sending the water back through generators to produce power the next day, the so-called pumped-storage hydroelectricity.

== Solar power ==
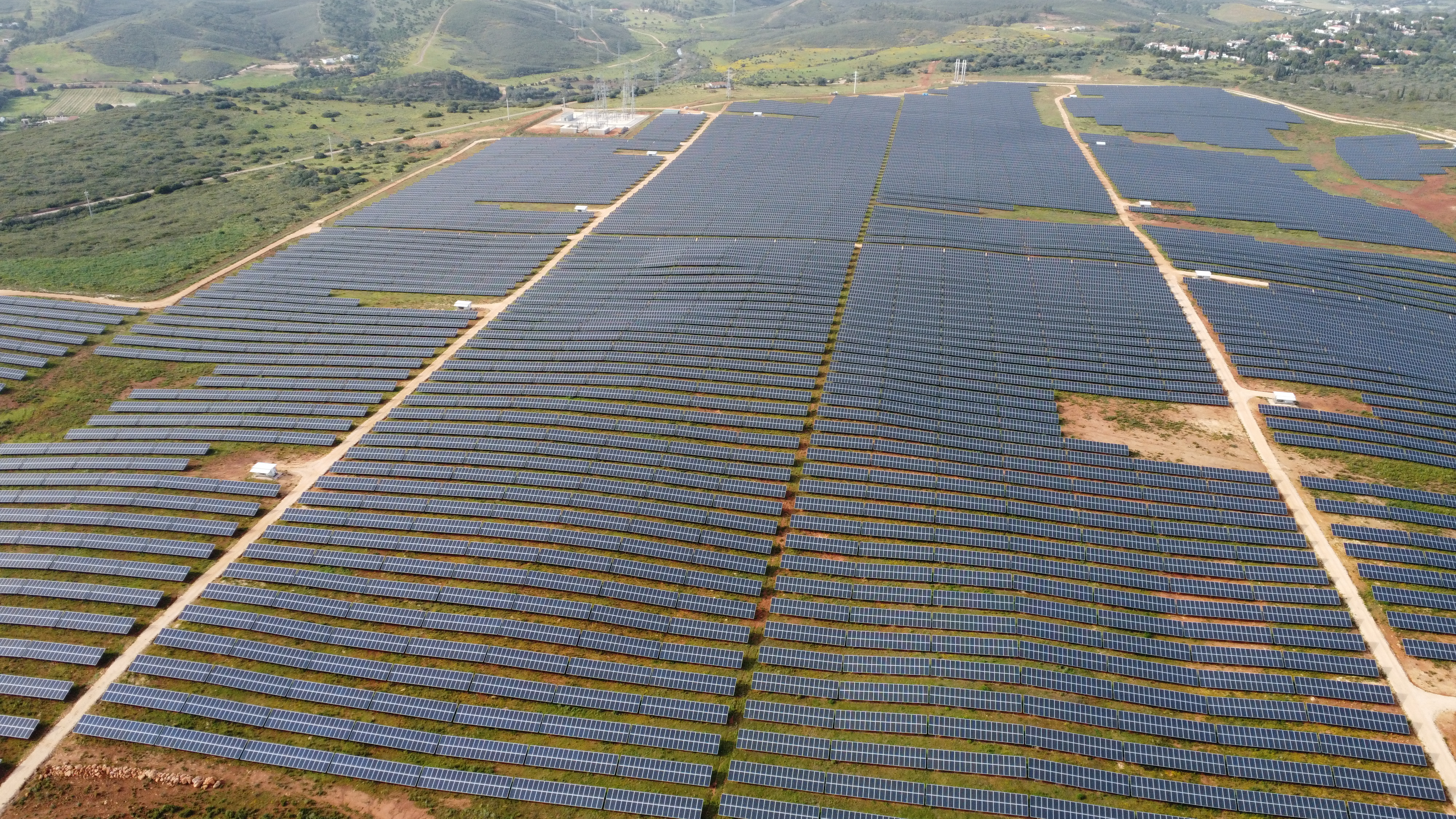
Solar power plant in Lagos - Algarve

At the end of 2018, solar power had a total installed capacity of 828 MW. It represented 2.2% of total power generation in 2019.

== Geothermal power ==
Portugal's main investment for the use of this type of energy is in the Azores. Small scale use of this energy source began in the 1980s in Chaves and S. Pedro do Sul, Continental Portugal providing 3 MWt.

In the Azores the use of geothermal energy is widespread, with production in eight of the nine islands, collectively producing some 235.5 MWt. In 2003, 25% of the electricity consumed in São Miguel was produced by geothermal energy.

== Wave power ==
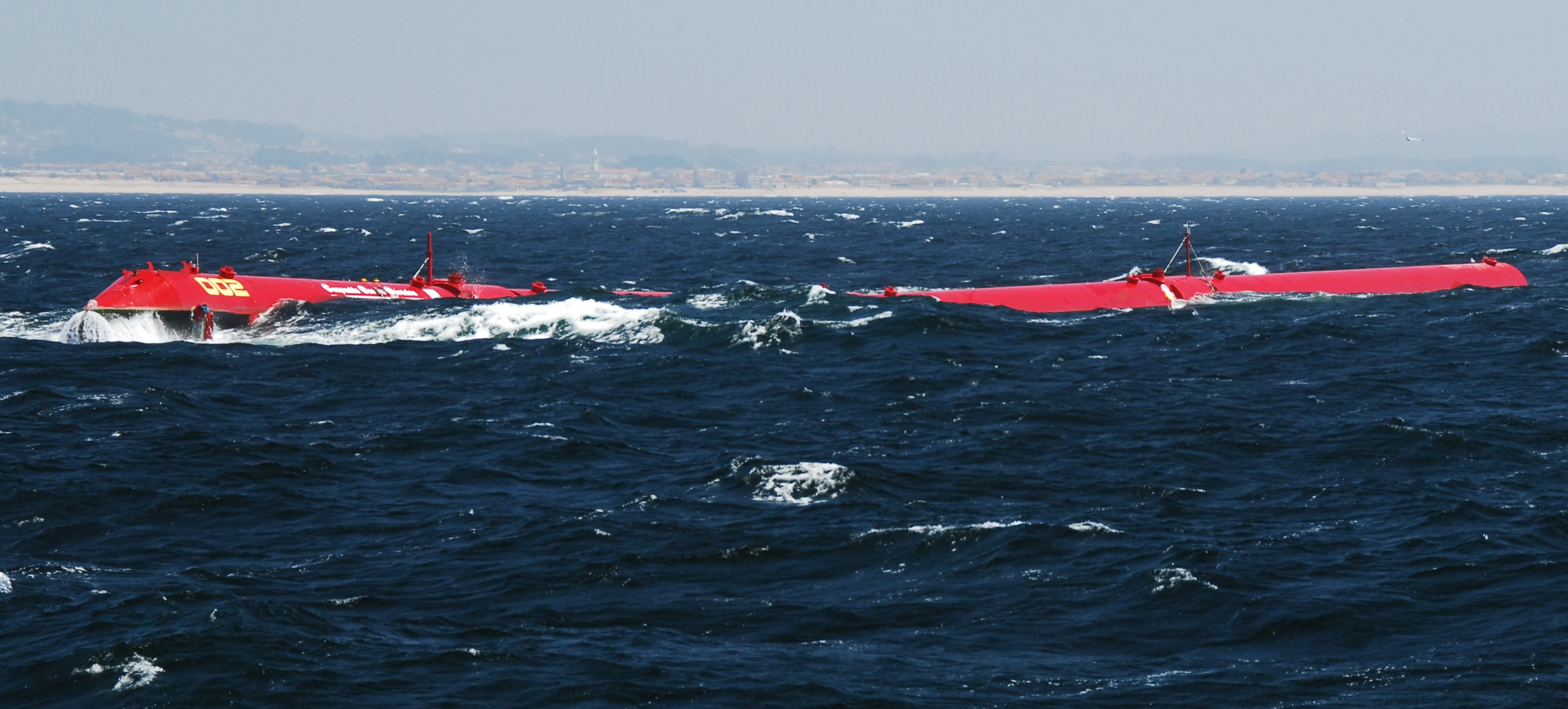
One of three Pelamis machines at the Aguçadoura Wave Park

Aguçadoura Wave Farm was the world's first commercial wave farm when it opened on 23 September 2008. It was located three miles (5 km) offshore near Póvoa de Varzim north of Porto. The farm used three Pelamis wave energy converters to convert the motion of the ocean surface waves into electricity. The wave farm was shut down in November 2008, just over two months after the official opening.

In the 2010s, a local company, Wave Roller, installed many devices along the coast to make use of the water power.

== Biogas ==
In 2011, Portugal produced 45 ktoe (kiloton of oil equivalent) of biogas.

== See also ==
- List of renewable energy topics by country
- Renewable energy in the European Union
- Energy policy of the European Union
- Renewable energy development
- Renewable energy commercialization
