= Silvia Calzón =

Spanish epidemiologist and politician

The Most Excellent Silvia Calzón
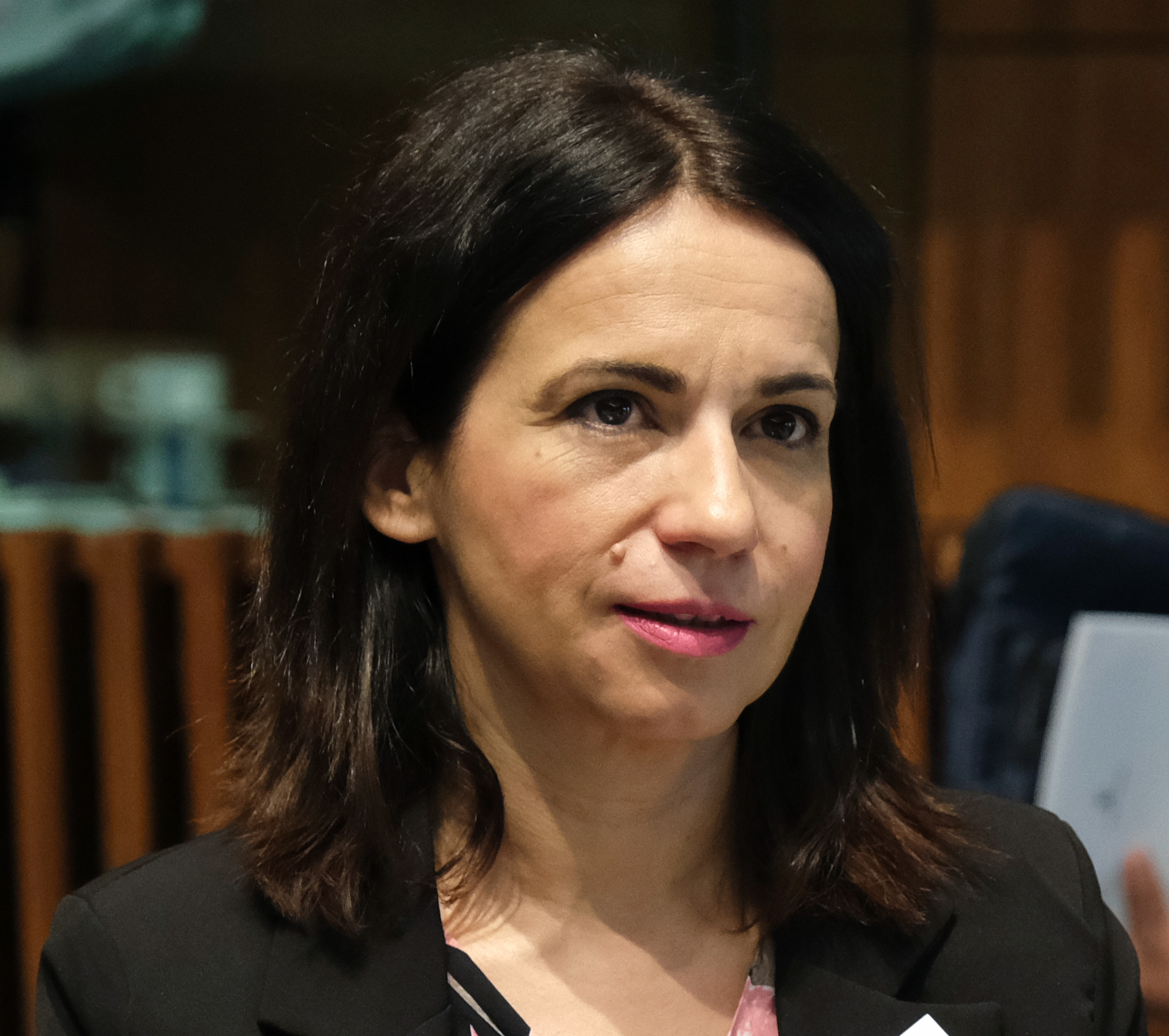
- Silvia Calzón in June 2022

Commissioner of the Nuclear Safety Council
- Incumbent
- Assumed office 16 April 2025
- Monarch: Felipe VI
- Prime Minister: Pedro Sánchez

Director of the Spanish Anti-Doping Agency
- In office 26 January 2024 – 2 October 2024
- Monarch: Felipe VI
- Prime Minister: Pedro Sánchez
- Preceded by: José Luis Terreros Blanco
- Succeeded by: Carlos Peralta Gallego

Secretary of State for Health
- In office 5 August 2020 – 29 November 2023
- Monarch: Felipe VI
- Prime Minister: Pedro Sánchez
- Preceded by: Position reestablished (previously, Luis Sánchez-Harguindey)
- Succeeded by: Javier Padilla Bernáldez

Director General of Juvenile Justice of the Regional Government of Andalusia
- In office 16 September 2008 – 5 May 2009

Member of the Parliament of Andalusia
- In office 5 May 2004 – 3 April 2008
- Constituency: Seville

Managing Director of the South of Seville Health Management Area
- In office 2017–2020

Member of the Utrera City Council
- In office 11 June 2011 – 6 February 2015
- In office 16 June 2007 – 16 September 2008
- In office 4 July 1999 – 14 June 2003

Personal details
- Born: Silvia Calzón Fernández; 3 June 1975 (age 50) Utrera, Province of Seville, Spain
- Party: Spanish Socialist Workers' Party (PSOE)
- Education: Álvarez Quintero; Ruiz Gijón; University of Seville (M.D.); University of Granada (PhD); Escuela Andaluza de Salud Pública; Pompeu Fabra University
- Occupation: Epidemiologist and politician

Silvia Calzón Fernández (born 3 June 1975) is a Spanish epidemiologist and politician who is currently serving as commissioner of the Nuclear Safety Council. She is also known for serving as secretary of state for health from 2020 to 2023 (Note: In Spain, Secretaries of State are junior ministers.) and, briefly, as director of the Spanish Anti-Doping Agency in 2024.

== Biography ==
Calzón was born in Utrera, Seville, Spain, on 3 June 1975. She was the second of three children. Her father worked as a builder, while her mother managed the family's affairs at home. Calzón studied at Álvarez Quintero and, later, Ruiz Gijón. She studied medicine at the University of Seville and completed her residency as a specialist in preventive medicine and public health. Calzón has also earned a number of other degrees. She earned a doctorate in economic and business sciences from the University of Granada, a masters in public health and health management from the Andalusian School of Public Health, a masters in the economics of health and medicine from Pompeu Fabra University, and, finally, a diploma of specialization in gender and health from the Andalusian School of Public Health.

== Professional career ==
=== Political work ===
As a child, Calzón was interested in medicine and politics, joining the Socialist Youth of Spain (the youth arm of the Spanish Socialist Workers' Party). In 1999, she was elected for the first time to the Utrera City Council, serving simultaneously as deputy mayor. In 2007, she ran for mayor of Utrera but lost to her opponent.

By 2020, Calzón was serving as the president of her political party's organization in Utrera.

=== Health-focused work ===
In October 2013, Calzón began working as a primary epidemiologist for the Málaga-Valle del Guadalhorce Health District. In 2015, she resigned from the Utrera City Council to serve as the Managing Director of the South of Córdoba Health Management Area; two years later, in 2017, she took up the same job for the South of Seville Health Management Area. Starting in 2019, Calzón served as the primary epidemiologist for the Health District of Seville as part of the Andalusian Health Service.

==== Secretary of State for Health ====
In August 2020, the then-Minister of Health, Salvador Illa, reestablished the Secretariat of State for Health as the highest governing body of the Ministry of Health, with the goal of reforming the health response of Spain in the face of the COVID-19 pandemic. Illa chose Calzón to lead the Secretariat, and she was officially named for the job on 5 August 2020, making her the second-in-command of the Ministry of Health.

She left the office in November 2023 and, in January 2024, she was appointed director of the Spanish Anti-Doping Agency. In September 2024 she joined the Office of the Prime Minister as director of the Department for Citizens Services.

In April 2025, she was appointed commissioner of the Spanish Nuclear Safety Council.
