= Consejo Superior de Deportes =

Spanish government agency for sport

National Sports Council
- Consejo Superior de Deportes
- Logo of the CSD

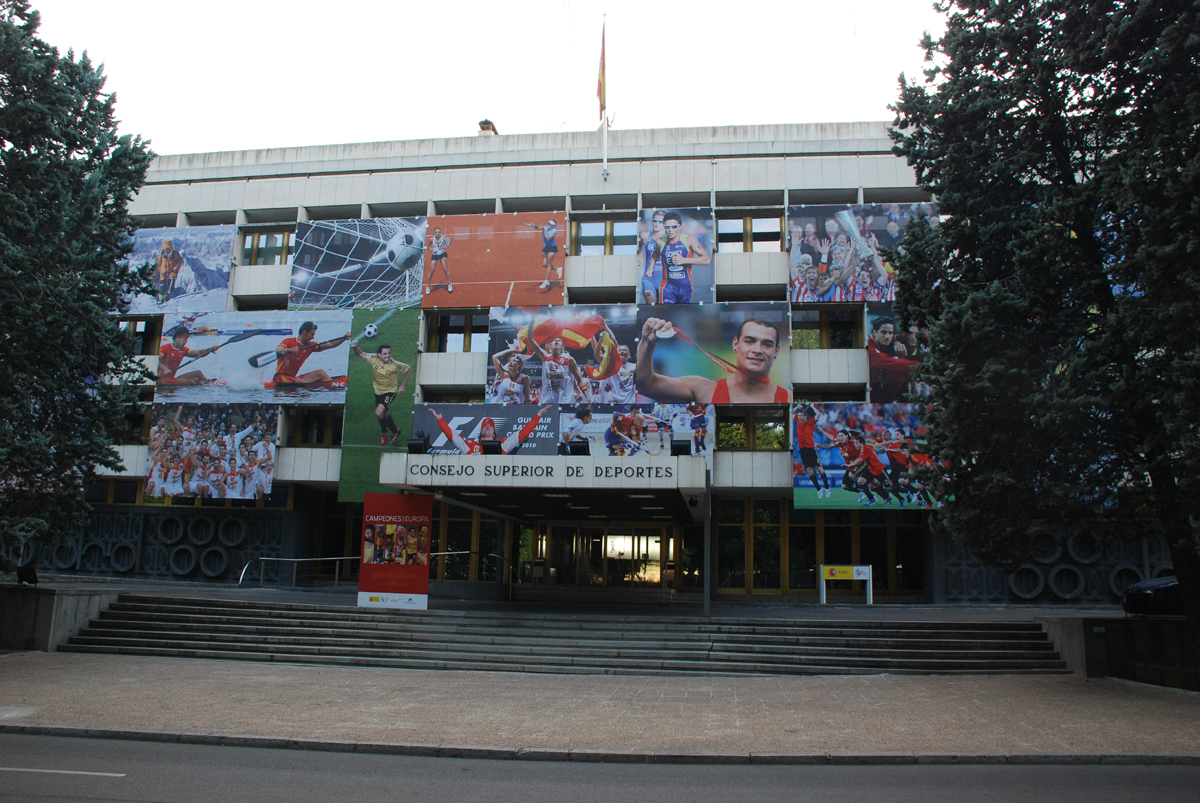
- Headquarters of the CSD within Complutense University

Agency overview
- Formed: 27 August 1977 (47 years ago)
- Preceding agency: National Sports Delegation (1941–1977)
- Jurisdiction: Spain
- Headquarters: Madrid, Spain
- Annual budget: € 381.8 million, 2023
- Agency executive: José Manuel Rodríguez Uribes, President
- Parent department: Ministry of Education, Vocational Training and Sports
- Child agency: Spanish Anti-Doping Agency
- Website: www.csd.gob.es

The National Sports Council, also called Supreme Sports Council or High Council for Sports (Spanish: Consejo Superior de Deportes, CSD) is a Spanish government autonomous agency responsible for the promotion, planning and development of physical culture and sports activities of any kind, the coordination and support to social entities dedicated to sports as well as the relations between the Government and the Spanish Olympic Committee.

It is also in charge of the management and promotion of centers and services intended for sports practice, the sports education in schools and the inspection of the sports activities. To control cheating in sport and ensure the good health of athletes, the CSD has attached the Spanish Commission for the Fight Against Doping in Sport, commonly known as the Spanish Anti-Doping Agency.

The agency is led by a senior official with the rank of Secretary of State that holds the title of President of the National Sports Council. Since 31 March 2021 the president of the agency is José Manuel Franco.

== Presidents ==
The executive officer of the agency is the President. The president is appointed by the Monarch, at the request of the minister responsible for sport affairs, and after hearing the Council of Ministers. He or she has the rank of Secretary of State (second highest rank after a Crown Minister).

Since its creation in 1977, 18 people have served as president:

1. Benito Castejón Paz (1977–1980)
2. Jesús Hermida Cebreiro (1980–1982)
3. Romá Cuyás Sol (1982–1987)
4. Javier Gómez-Navarro (1987–1993)
5. Rafael Cortés Elvira (1993–1996)
6. Pedro Antonio Martín Marín (1996–1998)
7. Santiago Fisas Ayxelá (1998–1999)
8. Francisco Villar García-Moreno (1999–2000)
9. Juan Antonio Gómez-Angulo (2000–2004)
10. Jaime Lissavetzky (2004–2011)
11. Albert Soler Sicilia (2011)
12. Miguel Cardenal Carro (2012–2016)
13. José Ramón Lete Lasa (2016–2018)
14. María José Rienda Contreras (2018–2020)
15. Irene Lozano (2020–2021)
16. José Manuel Franco (2021–2023)
17. Víctor Francos Díaz (2023)
18. José Manuel Rodríguez Uribes (2023–present)

== See also ==
- Sport in Spain
- Spanish Anti-Doping Agency
- Sports Administrative Court
