= Western European Nuclear Regulators' Association =

The Association of Regulators of Western Europe (WENRA), created on 4 February 1999, is an association of agencies or regulatory agencies in the field of nuclear countries of Western Europe (including Switzerland).

WENRA want to be a European network of chief regulators of EU countries with nuclear power plants (and Switzerland as well as of other interested European countries which have been granted observer status) to improve nuclear safety.

== Missions ==
The main purpose of WENRA are to develop:

- a European approach to nuclear safety;
- provide an independent capability to examine nuclear safety in applicant countries;
- to be a network of chief nuclear safety regulators in Europe;
- to be a place where exchanging experience and discussing significant safety issues for regulators.

== Members ==
They are the representatives of authorities or nuclear regulators from 10 countries (in 1999) brought to 17 countries (March 2003), including at least:

- Belgium – Federal Agency for Nuclear Control (FANC) (http://www.fanc.fgov.be)
- Belgium – BEL V (http://www.belv.be)
- Bulgaria – Nuclear Regulatory Agency (NRA) (http://www.bnsa.bas.bg)
- Czech Republic – State Office for Nuclear Safety (SÚJB) (http://www.sujb.cz)
- Finland – Radiation and Nuclear Safety Authority (STUK) (http://www.stuk.fi)
- France – DGSNR
- France – Agence de sûreté nucléaire (ASN) (http://www.asn.fr)
- France – Institute de Radioprotection et de sécurité nucléaire (IRSN) (http://www.irsn.fr)
- Germany – Federal Ministry for the Environment, Nature Conservation and Nuclear Safety (BMU) (http://www.bmu.de)
- Hungary – Hungarian Atomic Energy Authority (HAEA) (http://www.haea.gov.hu)
- Italy – Department of Nuclear, Technological and Industrial Risk National Agency for Environmental Protection and for Technical Services (ISPRA) (http://www.apat.gov.it)
- Lithuania – State Nuclear Power Safety Inspectorate (VATESI) (http://www.vatesi.lt)
- Netherlands – Inspectorate of Housing, Spatial Planning and the Environment (VROM) (http://www.vrom.nl/international)
- Romania – National Commission for Nuclear Activities Control (CNCAN) (http://www.cncan.ro)
- Slovak Republic – (Nuclear Regulatory Authority of the Slovak Republic (ÚJD) (http://www.ujd.gov.sk)
- Slovenia – SNSA (Ministry of Environment, Spatial Planning and Energy) (http://www.gov.si/ursjv)
- Spain – Spanish Nuclear Safety Council (CSN) (http://www.csn.es)
- Sweden – Swedish Radiation Safety Authority (SSM) (http://www.stralsakerhetsmyndigheten.se)
- Switzerland – Swiss Federal Nuclear Safety Inspectorate (ENSI) (http://www.ensi.ch)
- UK – Office for Nuclear Regulation (ONR) (http://www.onr.org.uk)
- Armenia – Armenian Nuclear Regulatory Authority (ANRA)
- Austria (observateur) – Ministry for Agriculture and Forestry, Environment and Water Management (BMLFUW) (http://www.lebensministerium.at/en)
- Ireland (observateur) – Radiological Protection Institute of Ireland (RPII) (http://www.rpii.ie)
- Luxembourg (observateur) – Radiological Protection Institute of Ireland (RPII) (http://www.ms.etat.lu)
- Norway (observateur) – Norwegian Radiation Protection Authority (NRPA) (http://www.nrpa.no)
- Poland (observateur) – Nuclear Atomic Energy Agency (PAA) (http://www.paa.gov.pl)
- Russian Federation – Federal Environmental, Industrial and Nuclear Supervision Service (Rostechnadzor) (http://www.gosnadzor.ru/)
- Ukraine – State Nuclear Regulatory Inspectorate of Ukraine (SNRIU) (https://snriu.gov.ua/en)

And three more observers invited (Armenia, Russian Federation and Ukraine) in 2009.

== Publications by WENRA ==
- RHWG Progress towards harmonisation of safety for existing reactors in WENRA countries (January 2011)
- WGWD Waste and spent fuel storage safety reference levels report (version 2.1, February 2011)
- WENRA statement on safety objectives for new nuclear power plants (November 2010)
- 2010: Revised WENRA Terms of Reference
- WGWD Waste and spent fuel storage safety reference levels report (version 2.0, March 2010)
- RHWG Safety Objectives for New Power Reactors (Study report December 2009, safety objectives in their final wording are presented in the statement November 2010)
- WENRA Presentation (August 2009)
- RHWG Safety Reference Levels (January 2008)
- RHWG Safety Reference Levels (Modifications of March 2007)
- RHWG PSA Explanatory Note (March 2007)
- WGWD - Waste and Spent Fuel Storage Safety Reference Levels Report (version 1.0, working document)
- WGWD - Decommissioning Safety Reference Levels Report (version 1.0, working document)
- WENRA Reactor Safety Reference Levels January 2007
- WENRA policy statement on harmonised safety approaches
- Harmonisation of Reactor Safety in WENRA countries (Main Report, January 2006)
- WENRA, 2003: Common views on the significance of national responsibility for nuclear safety
- WENRA, 2003: Pilot study on Harmonisation of Reactor Safety in WENRA Countries (pdf 71 kB)
- WENRA, 2000: WENRA Report on Nuclear Safety in the Candidate Countries to the EU (pdf 291 kB)
- WENRA, 2000: WENRA Report on Nuclear Safety in the Candidate Countries to the EU - Summary (pdf 101 kB)

== See also ==
- Global Initiative to Combat Nuclear Terrorism
- IAEA Areas
- Institute of Nuclear Materials Management
- Proliferation Security Initiative
- United Nations Atomic Energy Commission
- Nuclear Energy Agency
- International Energy Agency
- European Organization for Nuclear Research
- Lists of nuclear disasters and radioactive incidents
