= Arrocampo Reservoir =

- Embalse de Arrocampo (Spanish)
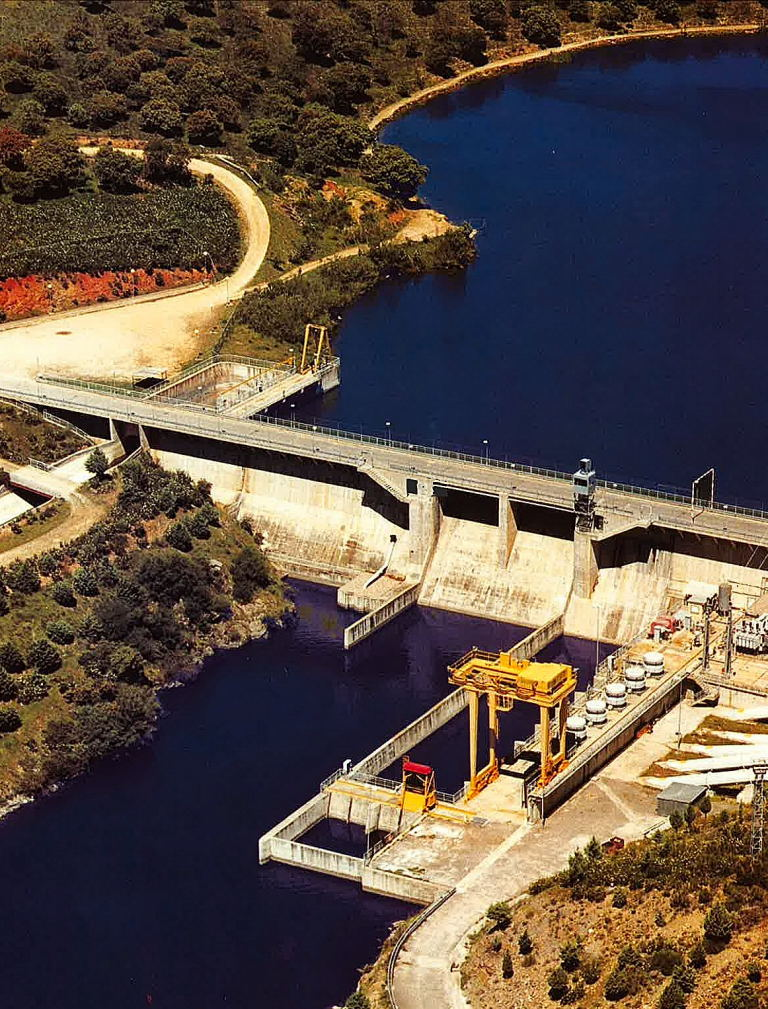
- Arrocampo reservoir dam

- Location within Spain
- Location: Almaraz, Romangordo, Saucedilla, Serrejón, Spain
- Coordinates: 39°49′N 05°42′W
- Type: reservoir
- Managing agency: Iberdrola, Endesa
- Built: 1976
- Surface area: 776 ha (1,920 acres)

(This article is a summary translation of Spanish article Embalse de Arrocampo of Wikipedia (es))

The Arrocampo Reservoir, (embalse de Arrocampo or embalse de Arrocampo-Almaraz in Spanish), is located in the province of Cáceres, Extremadura, Spain.

It was created at 1976 to refrigerate the turbines of the Almaraz Nuclear Power Plant. The nearest municipalities are Almaraz, Romangordo, Saucedilla and Serrejón. The dam is on the Arrocampo River (arroyo Arrocampo), very close to where this little river joins the Tagus.

== The Arrocampo reservoir as system to refrigerate the Almaraz Nuclear Plant ==
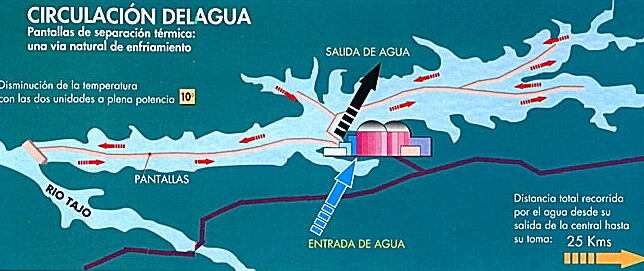
Water circulation in Arrocampo reservoir

The refrigeration of the Almaraz nuclear power plant was the first reason for the construction of the reservoir.
The water is taken from the Tagus and cover a U-shaped circuit of 25 km which allows the cooling of the heat generated by the two nuclear reactors of the plant. (See the illustration of the water circulation in Arrocampo) (...) The walls of thermic separation (pantallas de separación térmica in Spanish) (PST) are 11 km long and 8 m high (...). The tops of these walls are used by great cormorants and great egret as standing, resting and sleeping areas.

== The Arrocampo reservoir as a wetland ==
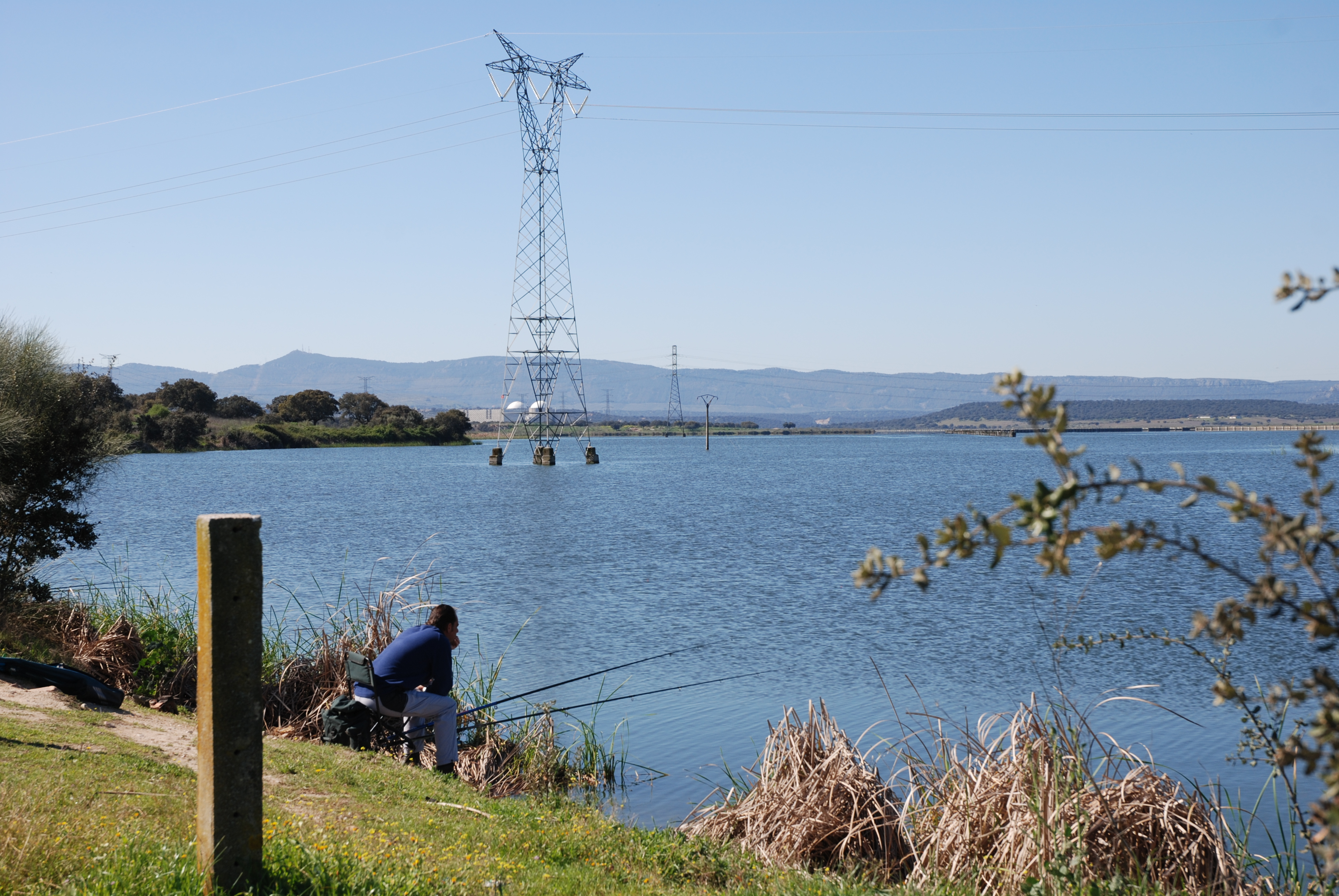
Arrocampo reservoir

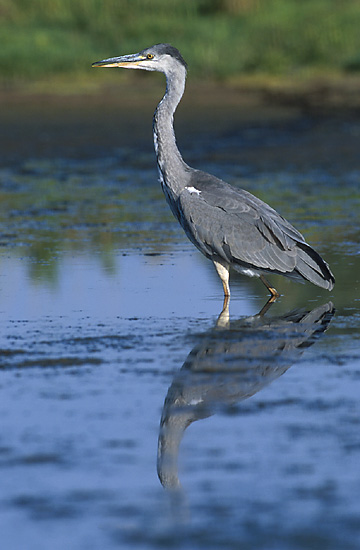
The grey heron can be watched in Arrocampo

- Biomass (ecology): biomass of reservoir waters is very important on all trophic levels, including Phytoplankton and zooplankton.
- Fish: Angling is often practiced on weekend and feast days. There are sometimes a lot of recreational fishermen at the principal access to the reservoir, near the local route Almaraz-Saucedilla. Species available include: Carps, Common barbel, Tench (Tinca tinca), Gambusia, Largemouth bass or black bass (this species is very common and the size is often spectacular), European eel.
- Birds: Before the creation of Arrocampo reservoir (1976), there were a lot of wild birds in lands of Almaraz, Saucedilla. White storks, cattle egrets, lesser kestrels ... are traditional birds of this area. Now there are two special protection areas: one is the parish church of Saucedilla (17 pairs of lesser kestrels on its walls and roofs) and the other one is all the Arrocampo reservoir.

== Gallery ==
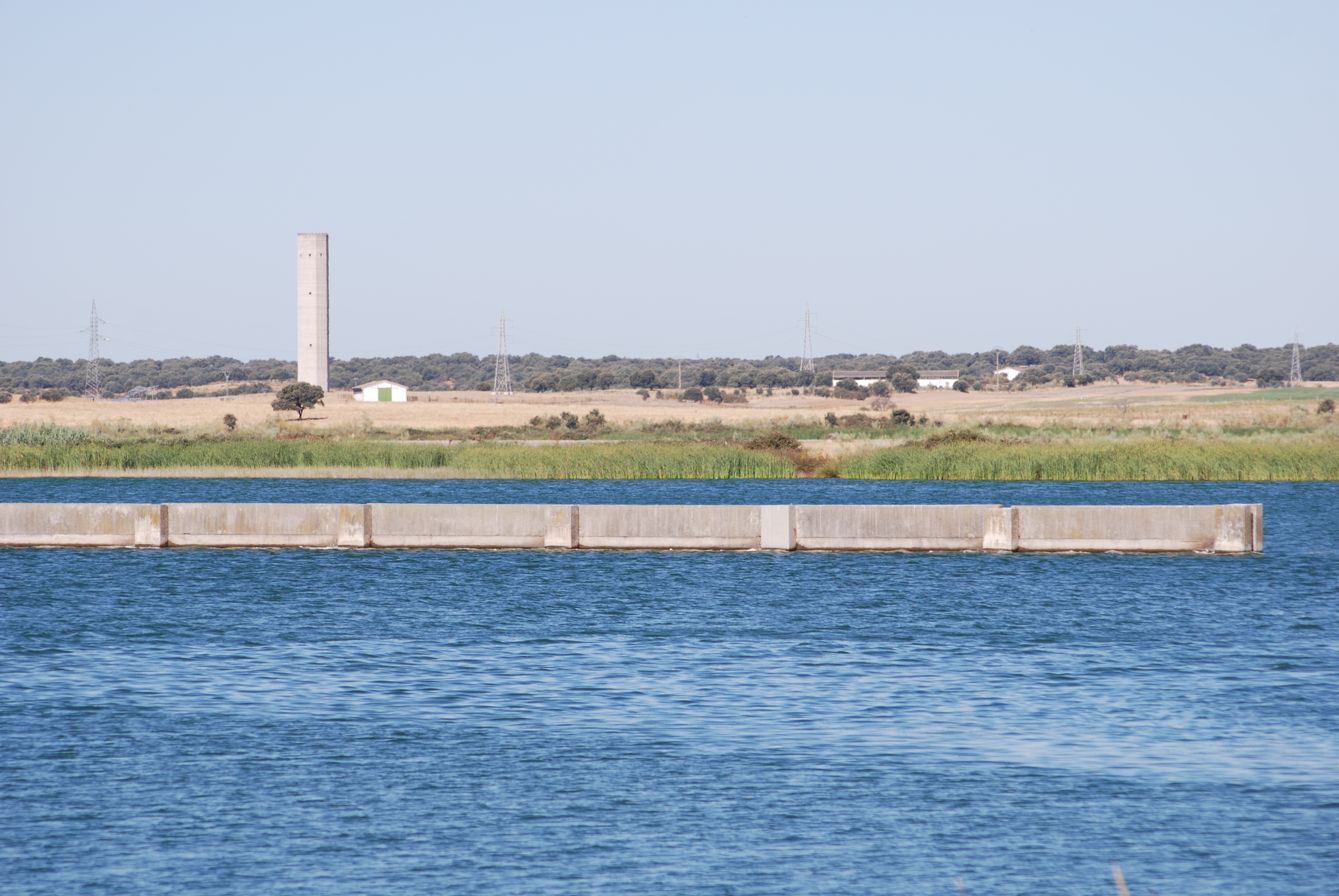
Wall of thermic separation in the reservoir

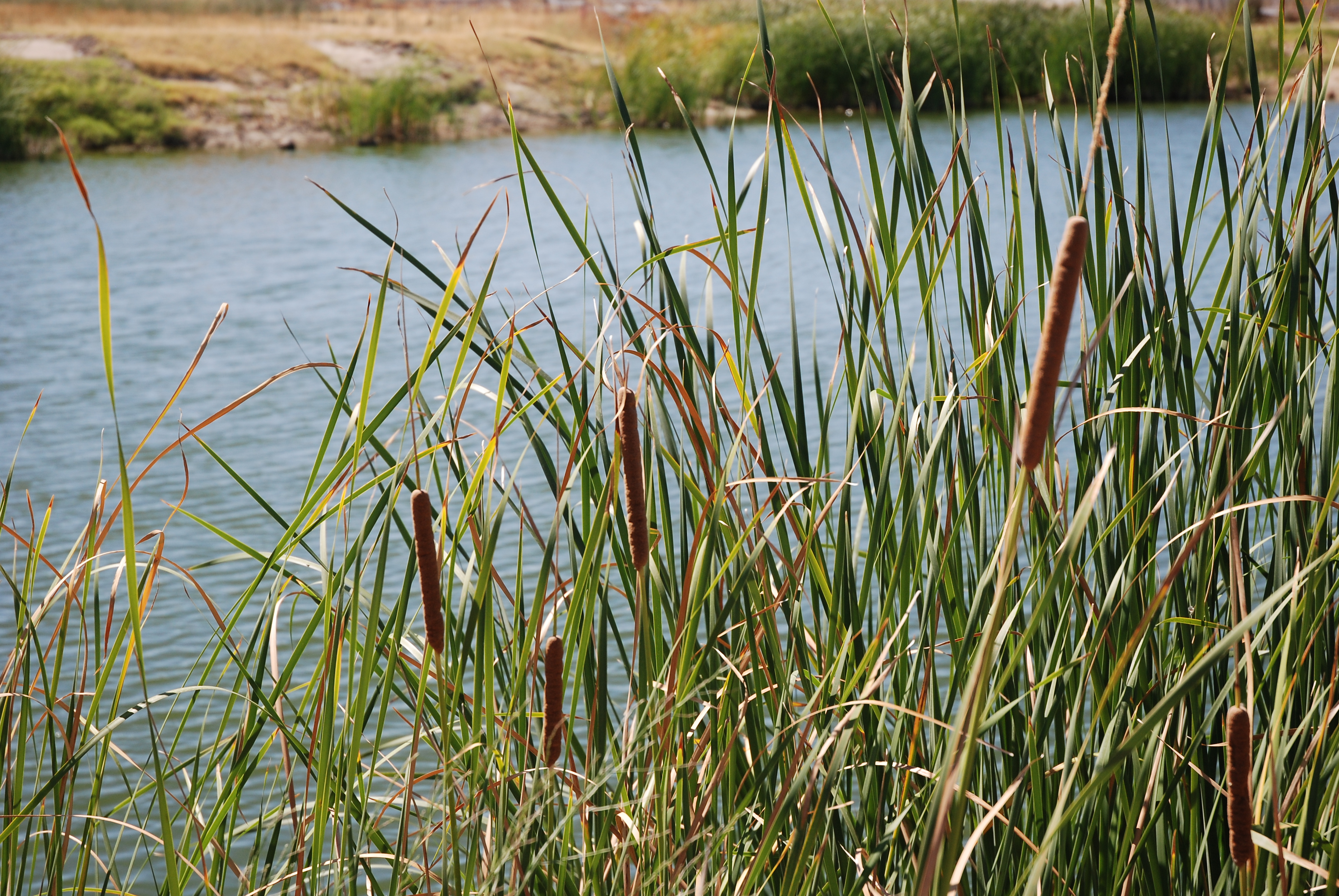
Typha plants (bulrush, cattail) in Arrocampo

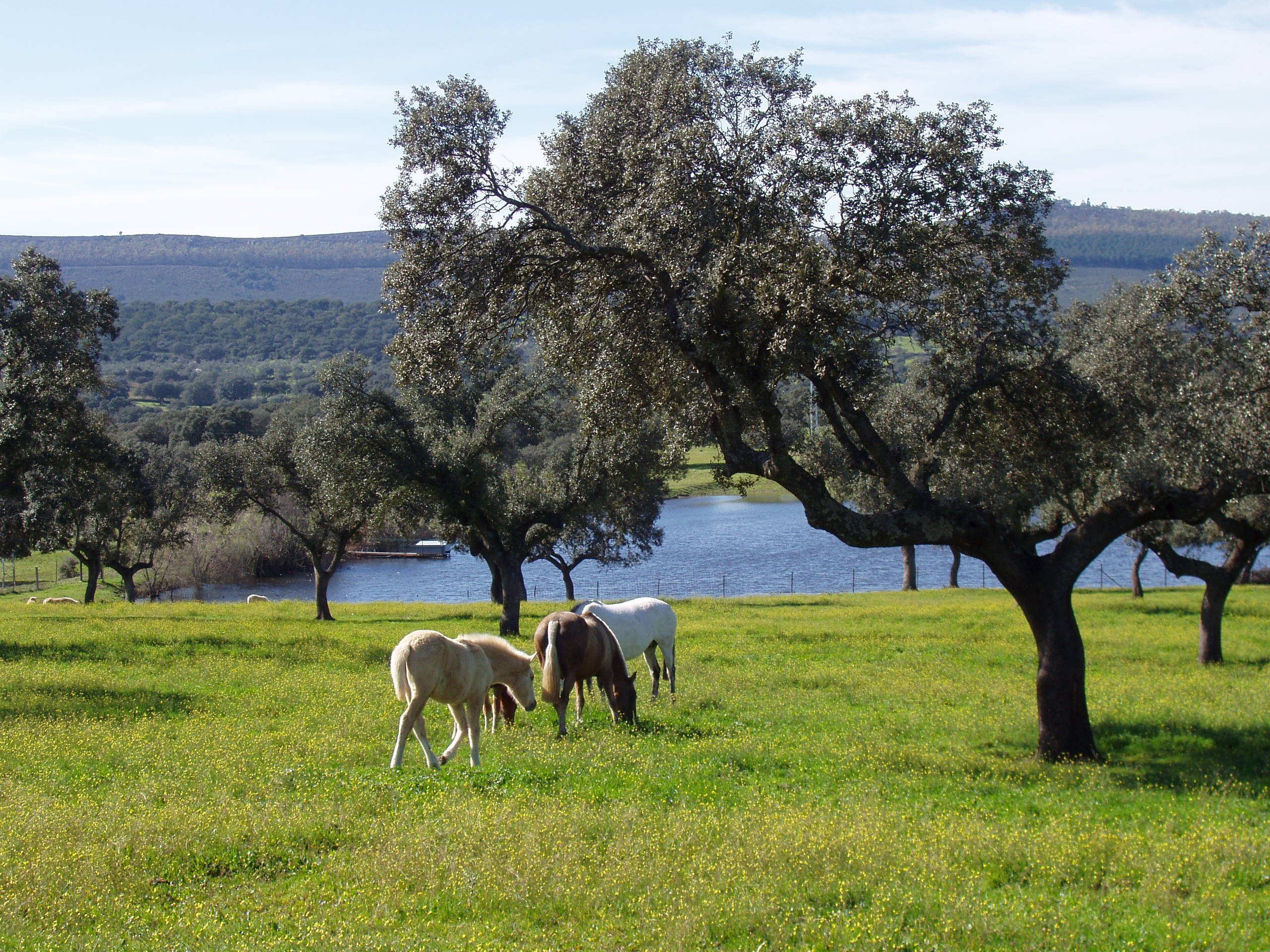
View of reservoir from a Saucedilla hill

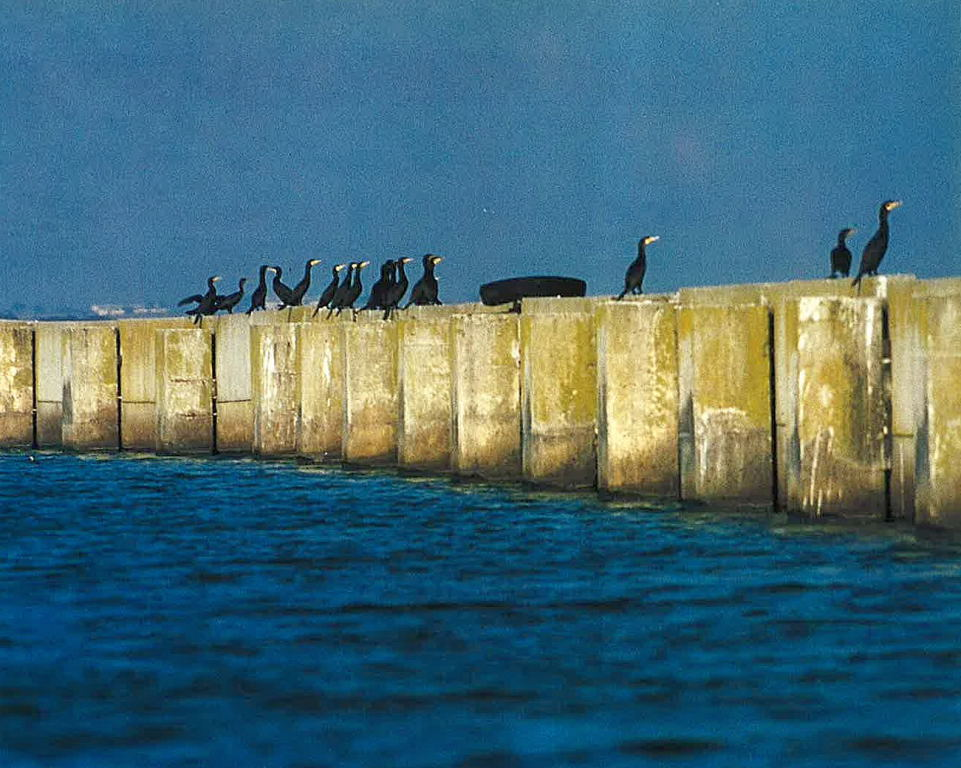
Great cormorants on the wall of thermic separation (CNA phot.)

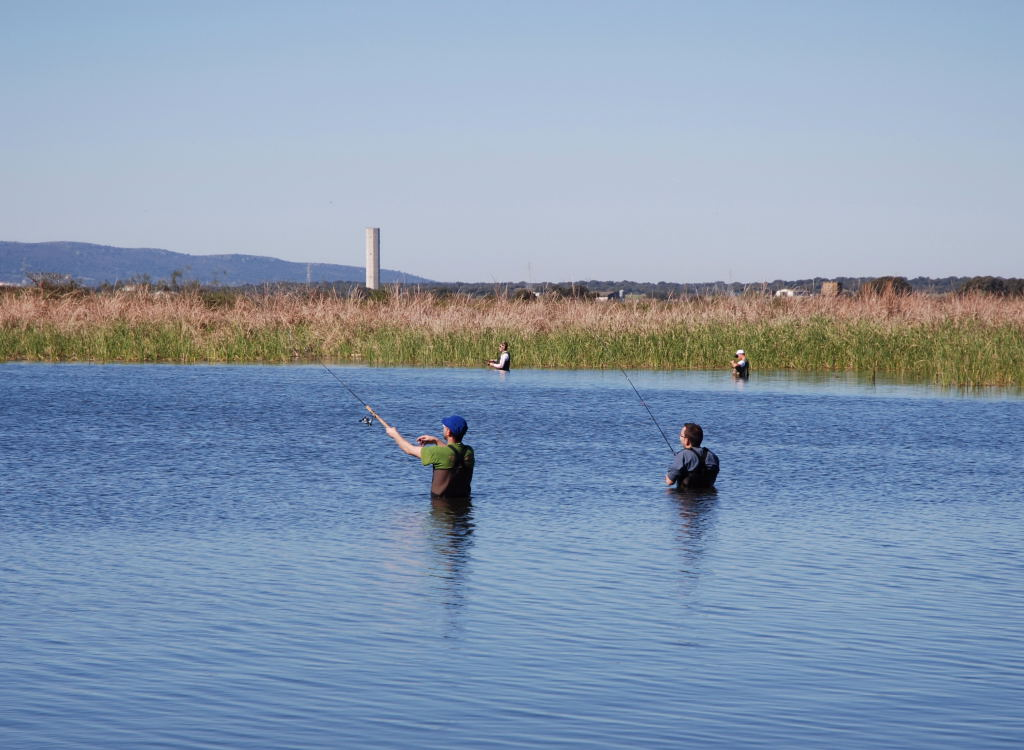
Anglers in Arrocampo

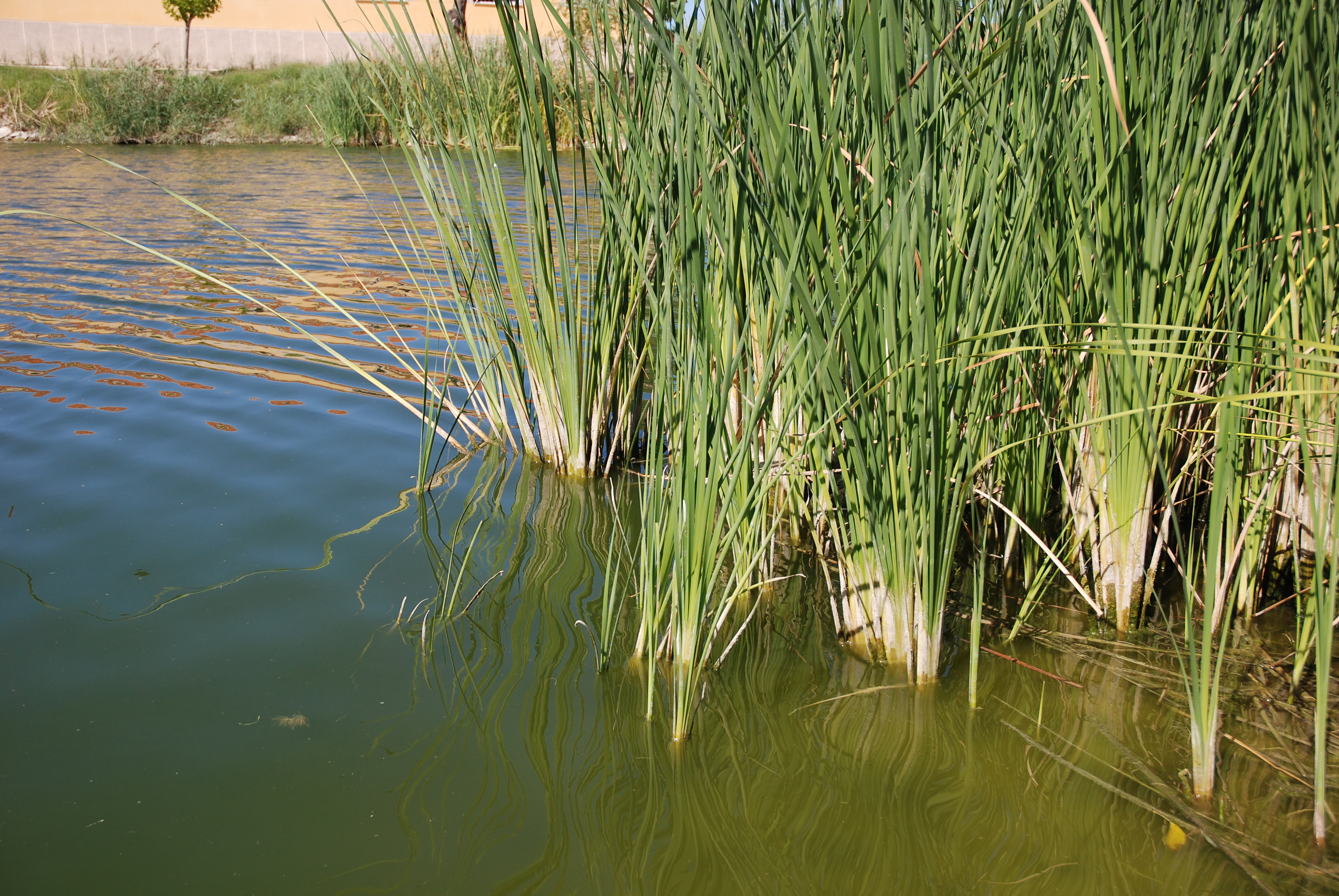
Cattail plants

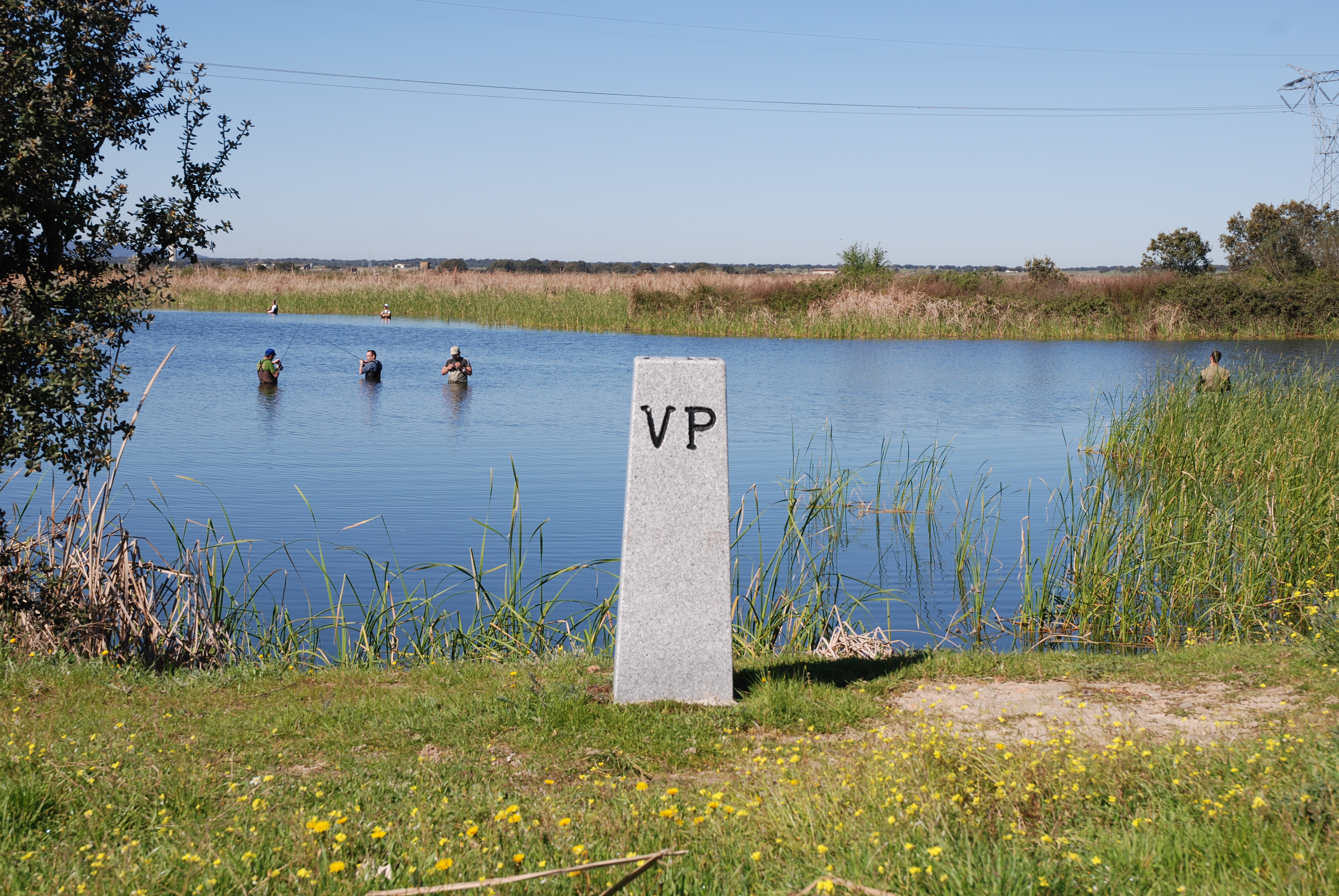
Angling

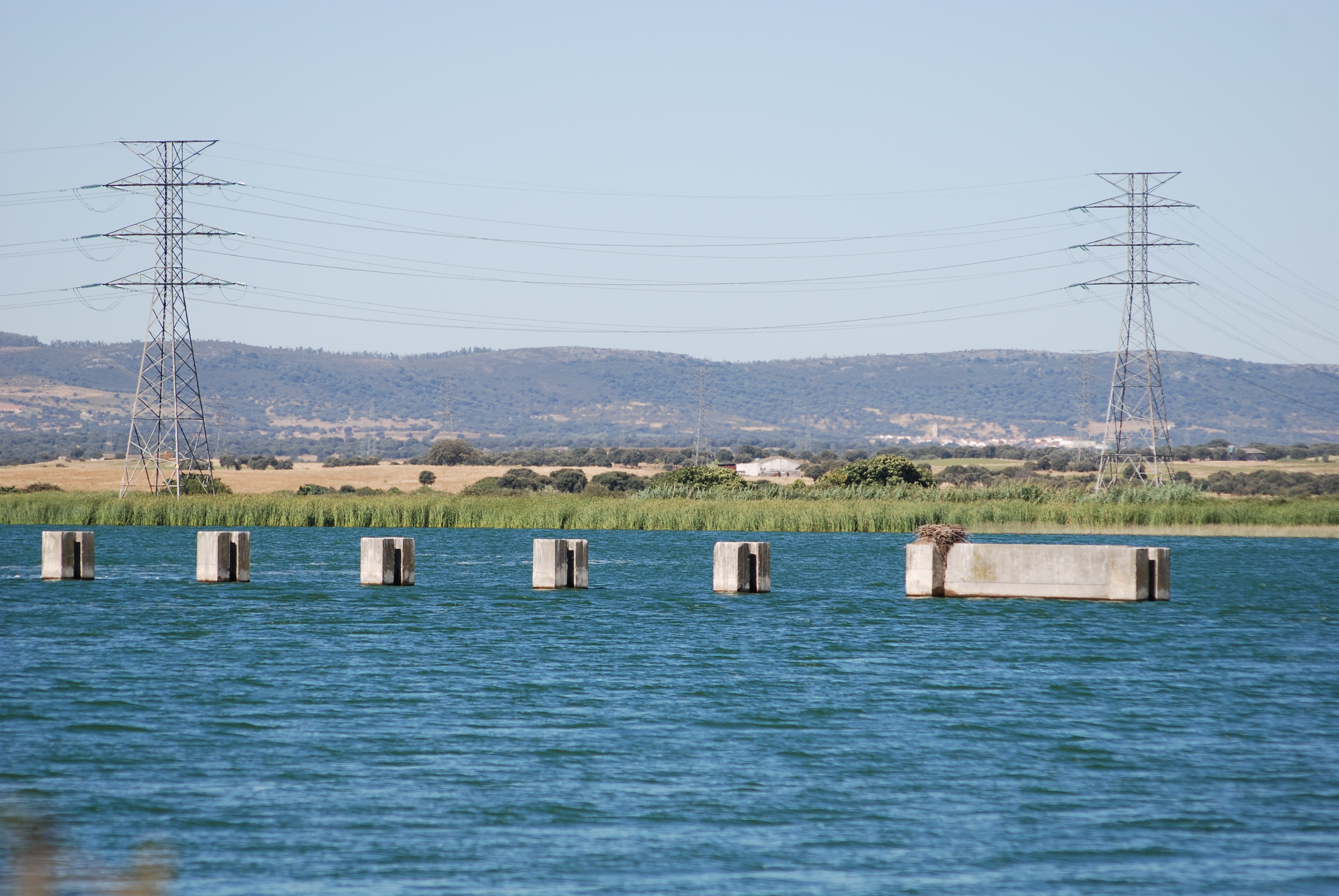
End of thermic separation wall

== The Arrocampo reservoir as a Special Protection Area (SPA) for wild birds ==
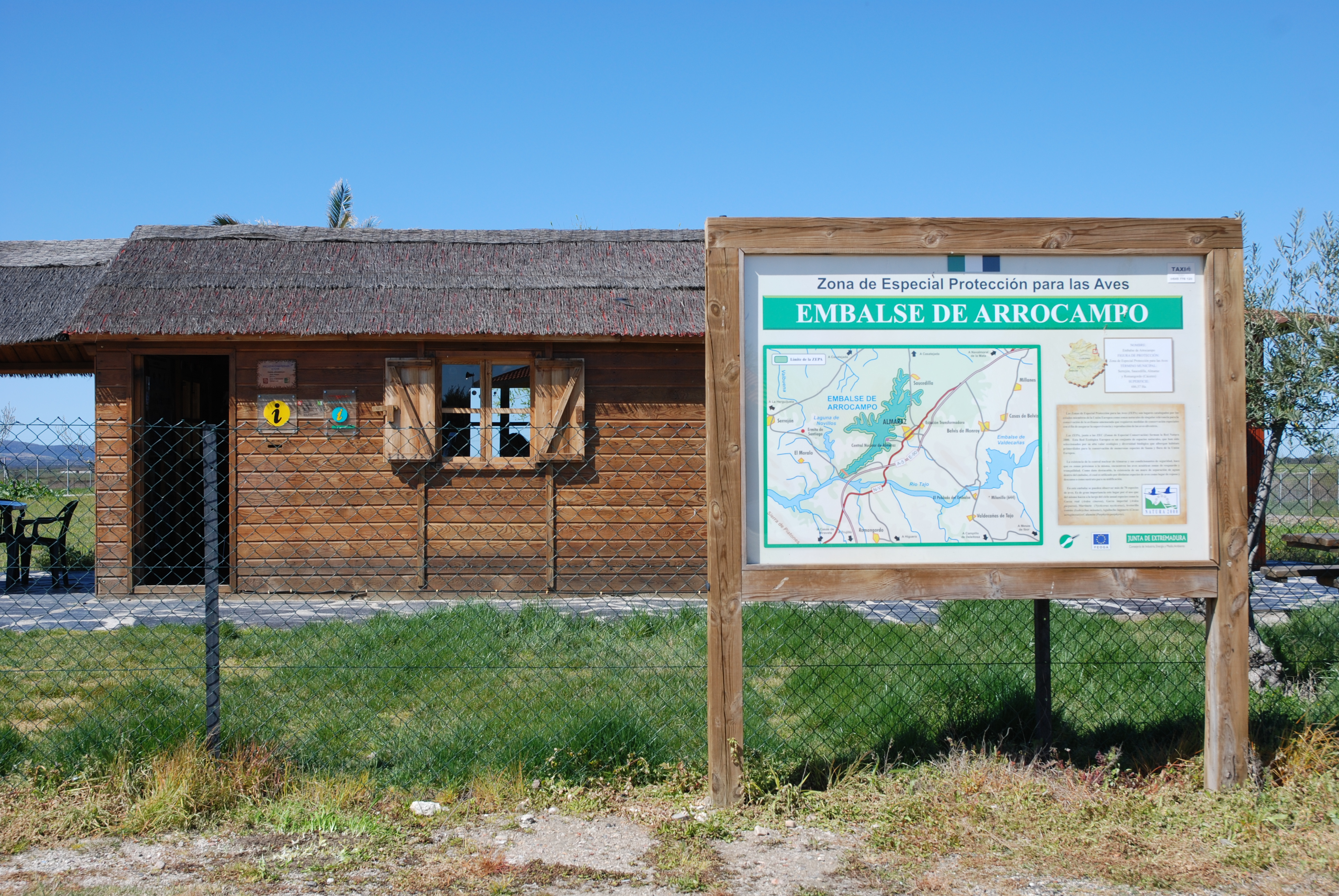
Information office of Arrocampo reservoir Special Protection Area at Saucedilla

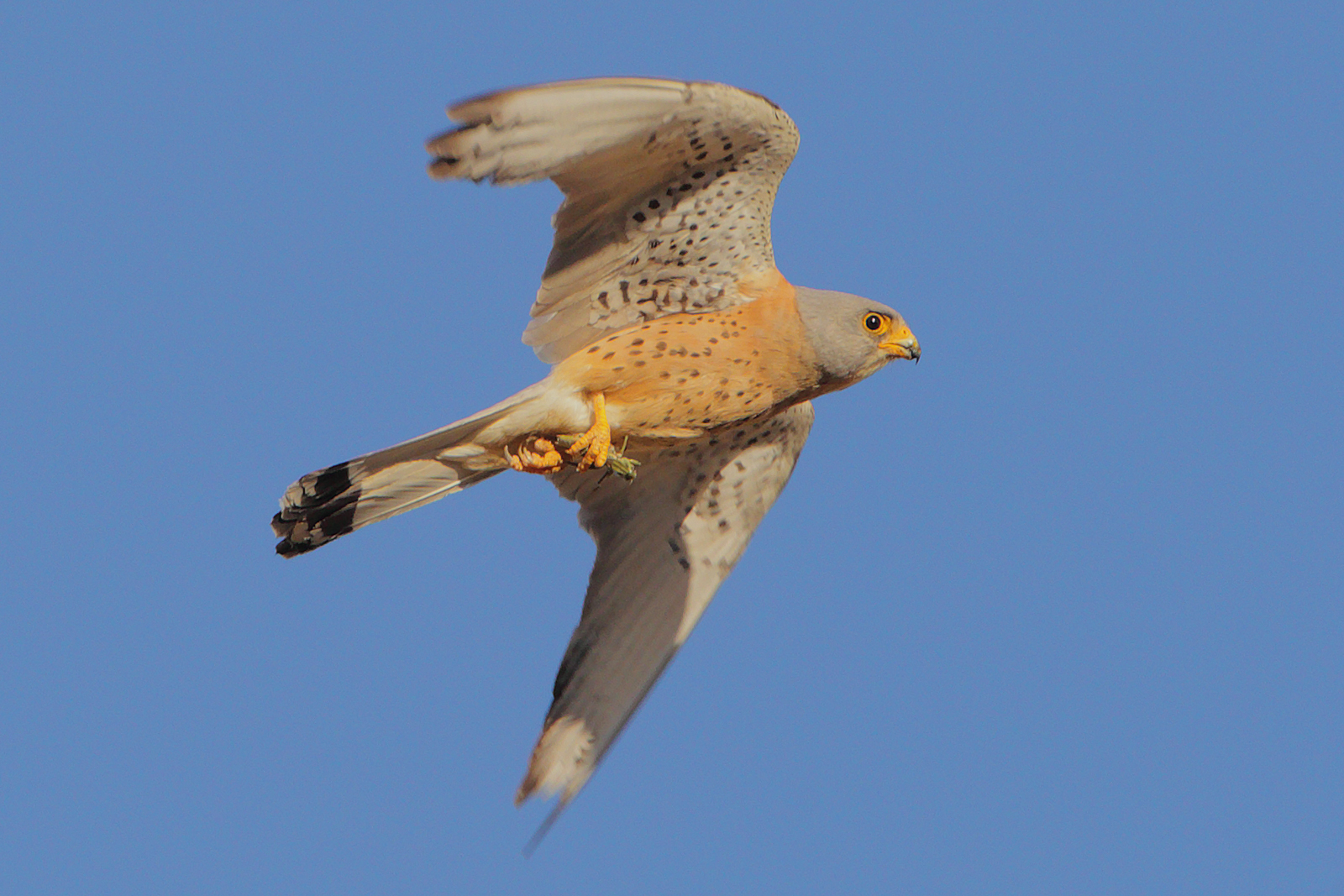
Lesser kestrel, protected in the walls and roofs of Saucedilla church

- White stork: nest & reproduction (n & r)
- Cattle egret:
- Great cormorant
- Lesser kestrel: (n & r)
- Purple heron: (n & r)
- Squacco heron: (n & r)
- Little grebe: (r & r)

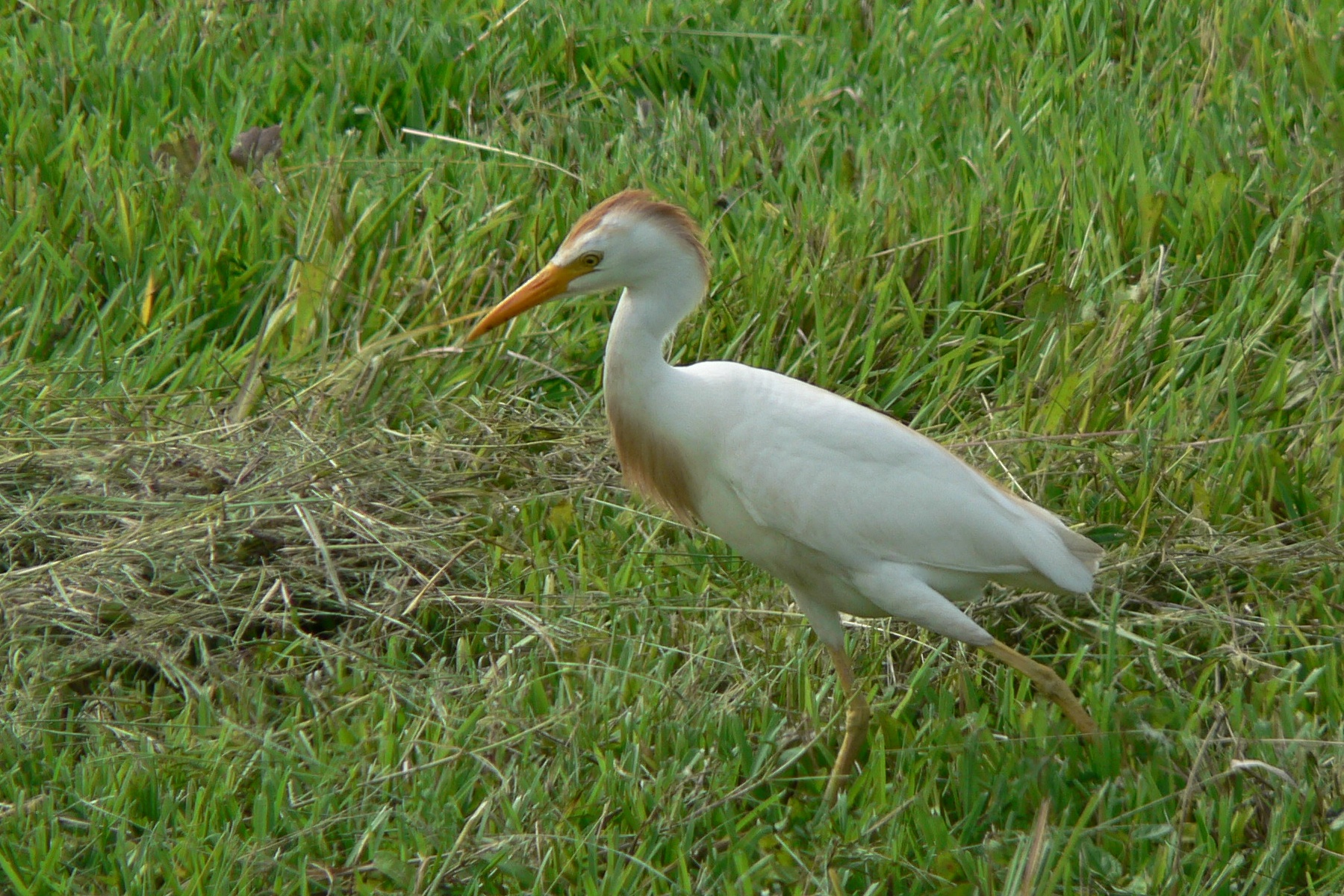
Cattle egret, very common in Arrocampo

- Great crested grebe: (n & r)
- Great bittern: (rare)
- Little bittern: (n & r)
- Night heron: (n & r)
- Little egret: (n & r)
- Great white egret
- Grey heron: (n & r)
- Eurasian spoonbill: (n & r)

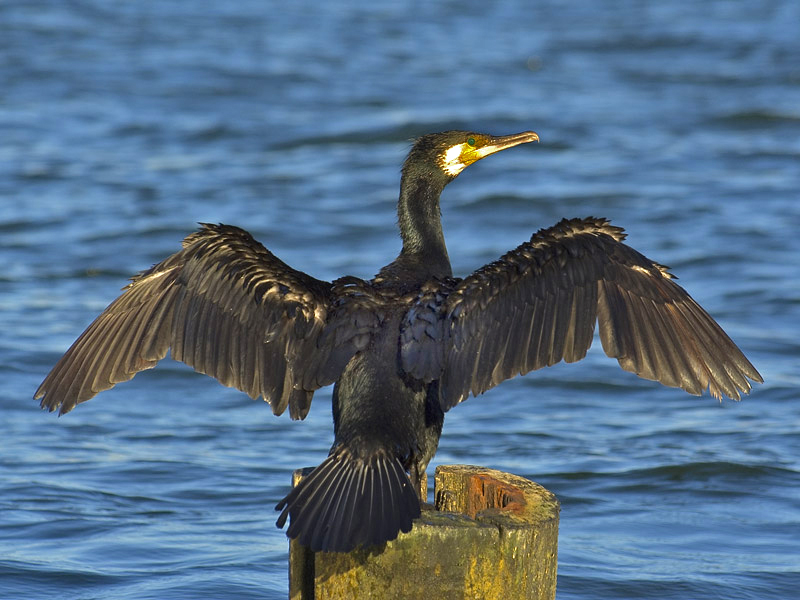
Great cormorant

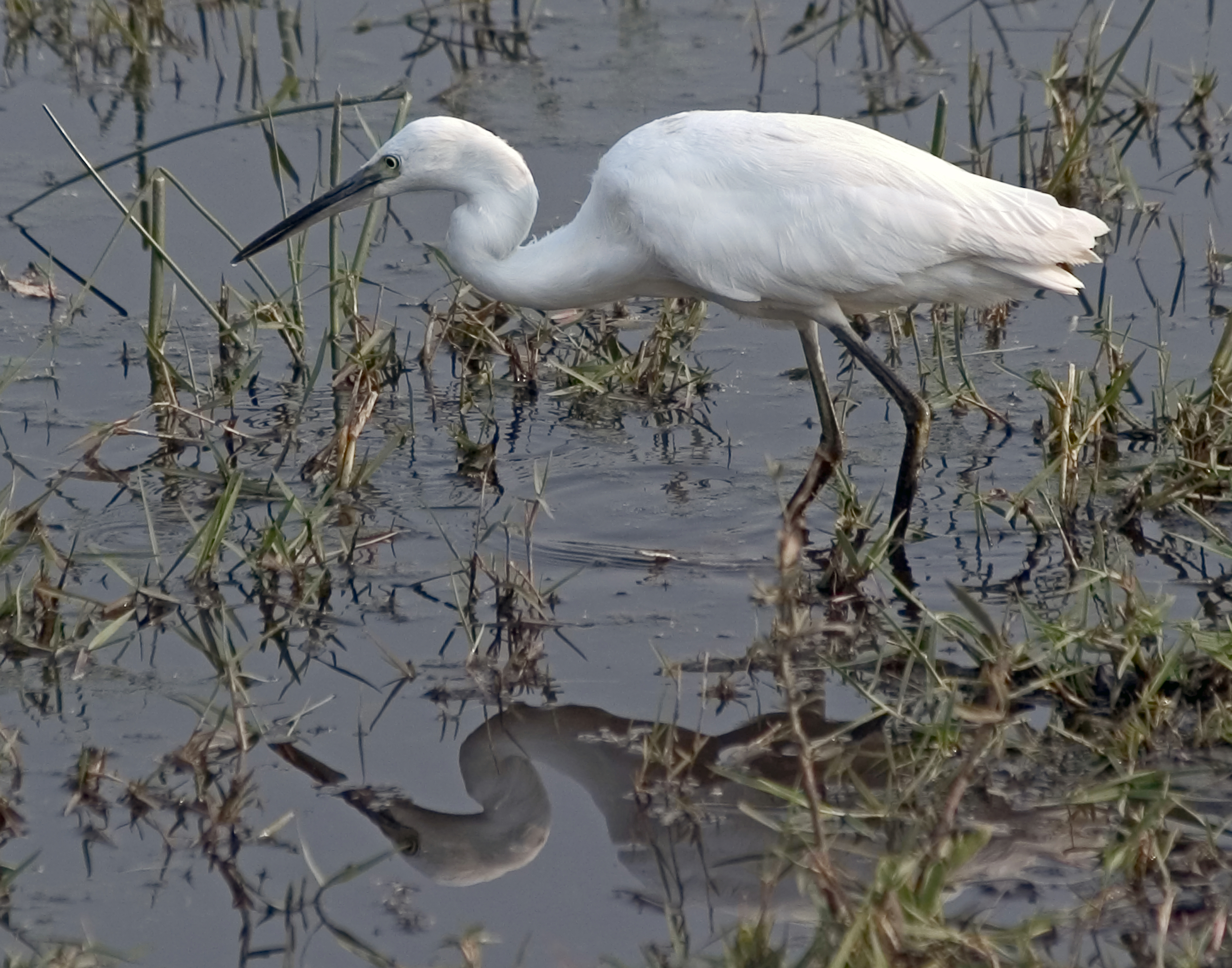
Little egret

- Greylag goose
- Egyptian goose: rare
- Ruddy shelduck: rare
- Eurasian wigeon
- Gadwall: (n & r)
- Common teal
- Mallard: (n & r)
- Northern shoveler

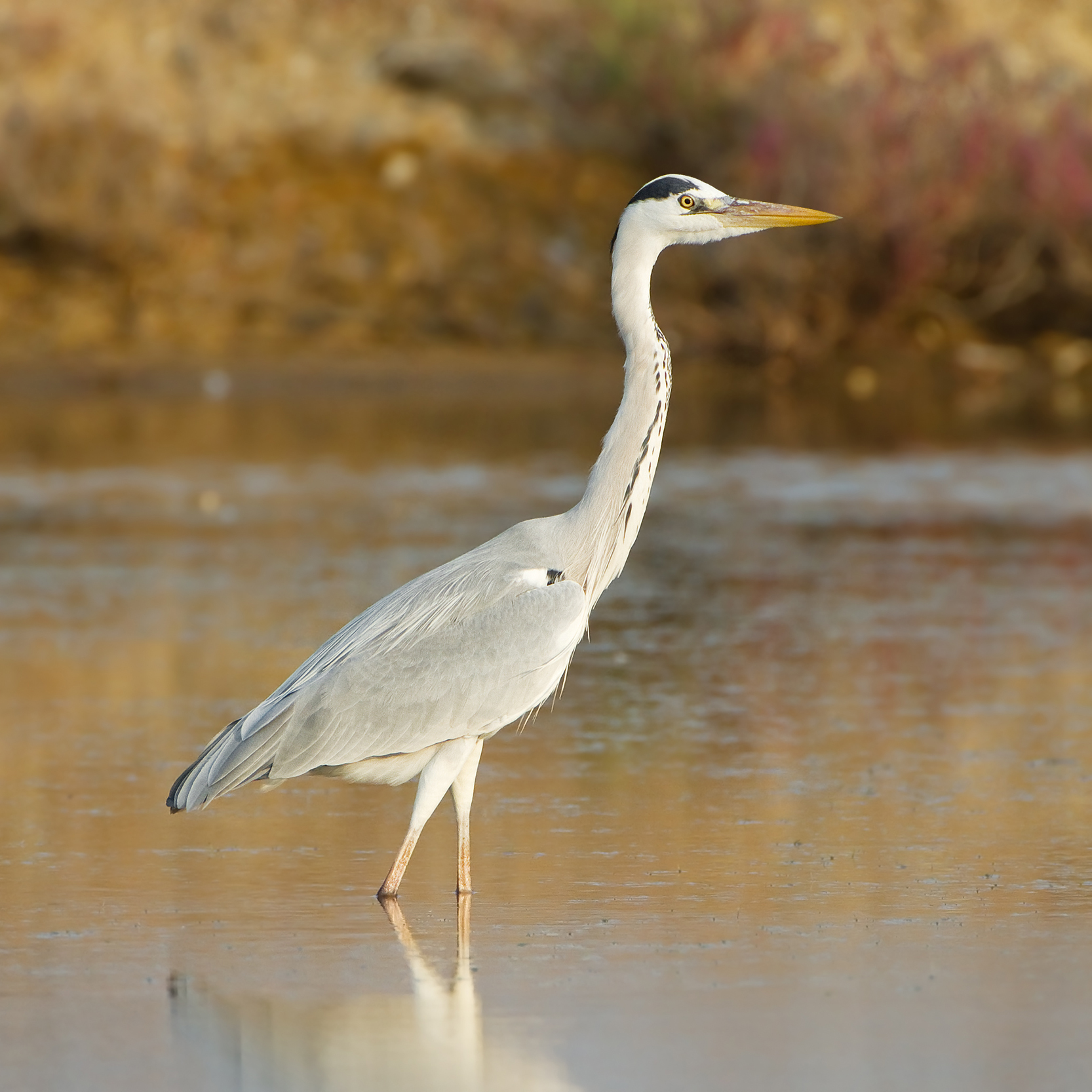
Grey heron

- Common pochard
- Tufted duck
- Black-winged kite: (n & r)
- Black kite
- Red kite
- Marsh harrier
- Hen harrier
- Montagus harrier
- Common buzzard
- Booted eagle
- Water rail
- Spotted crake
- Little crake
- Purple swamphen
- Northern lapwing
- Sanderling
- Dunlin
- Ruff
- Common snipe
- Black-tailed godwit
- Eurasian curlew
- Common redshank
- Moorhen
- Avocet
- Greenshank
- Wood sandpiper
- Common sandpiper
- Black-headed gull
- Lesser black-backed gull
- Gull-billed tern
- Whiskered tern
- Common kingfisher: (n & r)
- European bee-eater: (n & r)
- Sand martin: (n & r)
- Red-rumped swallow: (n & r)
- Yellow wagtail
- Grey wagtail

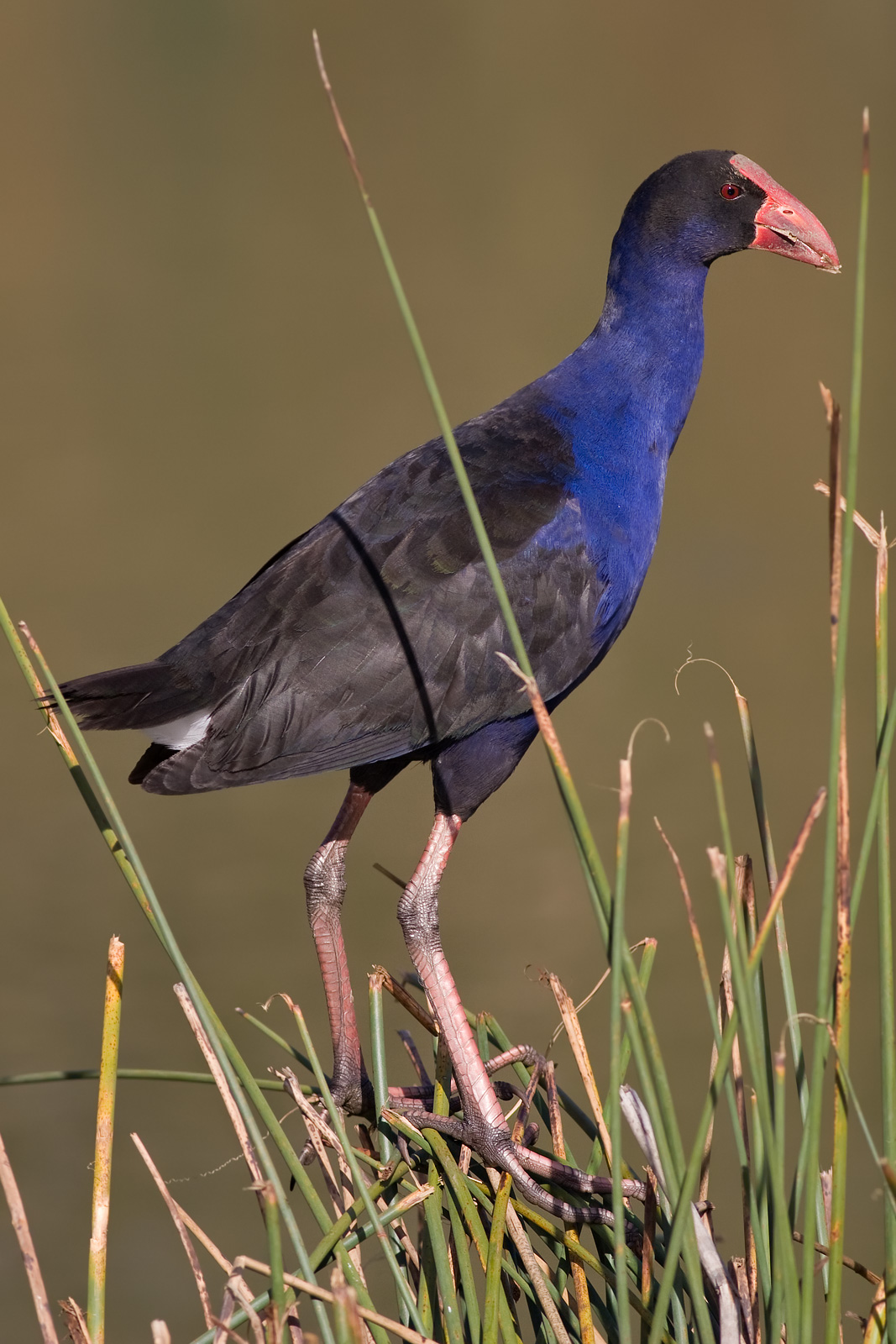
Purple swamphen: perhaps the symbol bird of Arrocampo reservoir

- Pied wagtail
- Bluethroat
- Cetti's warbler: (n & r)
- Zitting cisticola: (n & r)
- Savi's warbler: (n & r)
- Moustached warbler
- Sedge warbler
- Reed warbler
- Great reed warbler
- Bearded tit: rare
- Spanish sparrow: (n & r)
- Avadavat: (n & r)
- Collared pratincole
- Little ringed plover
- European golden plover

== The Arrocampo ornithologic park (Saucedilla) ==
The Arrocampo ornithologic park is located in the municipality of Saucedilla, near the reservoir. It was designed by the ornithologist Javier Briz.

- Monfragüe National Park: the proximity of this national park (...)
- Route 1: Arrocampo: (...)
- Route 2: Cerro Alto: (...)
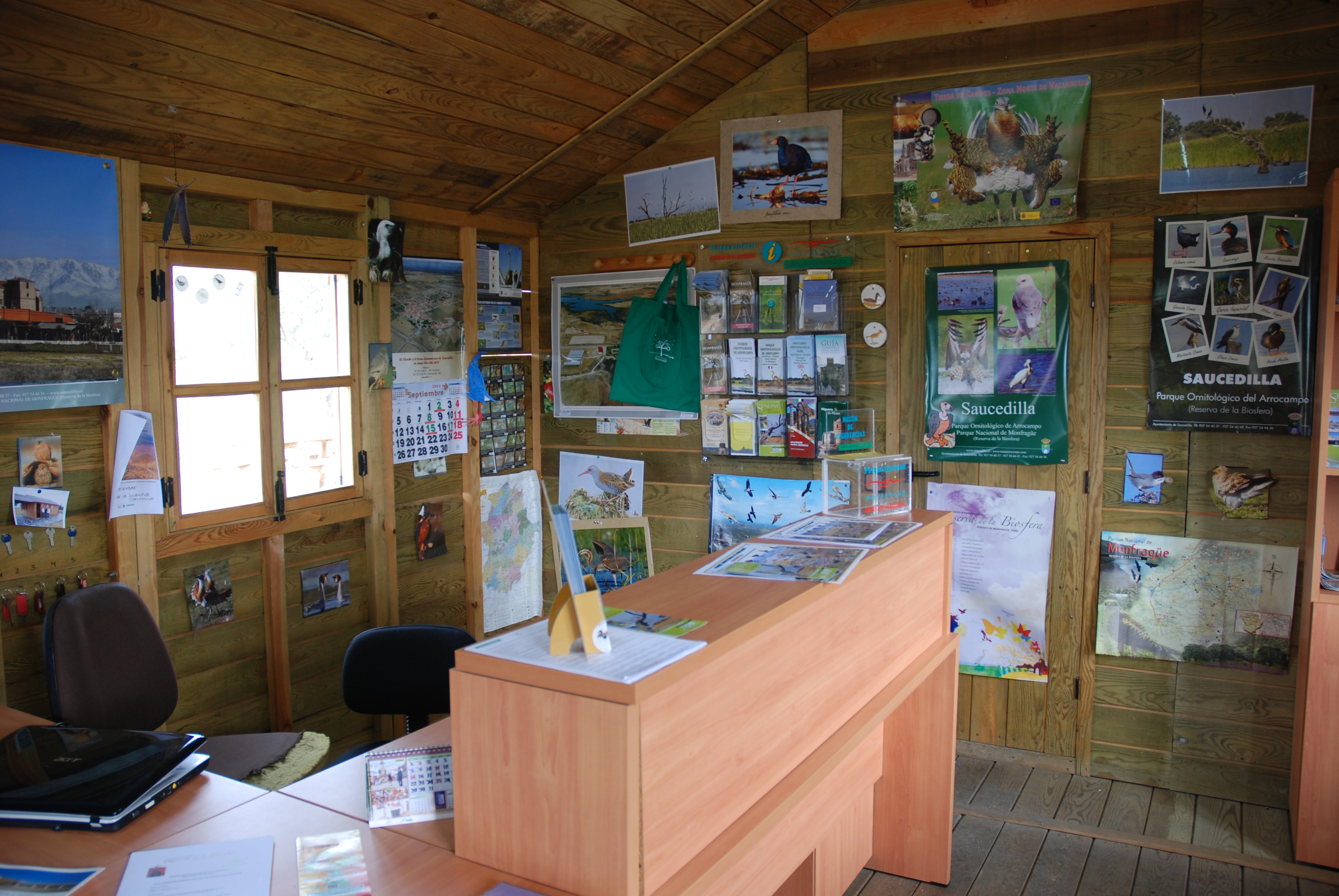
Interior of the Information Office of SPA Arrocampo reservoir

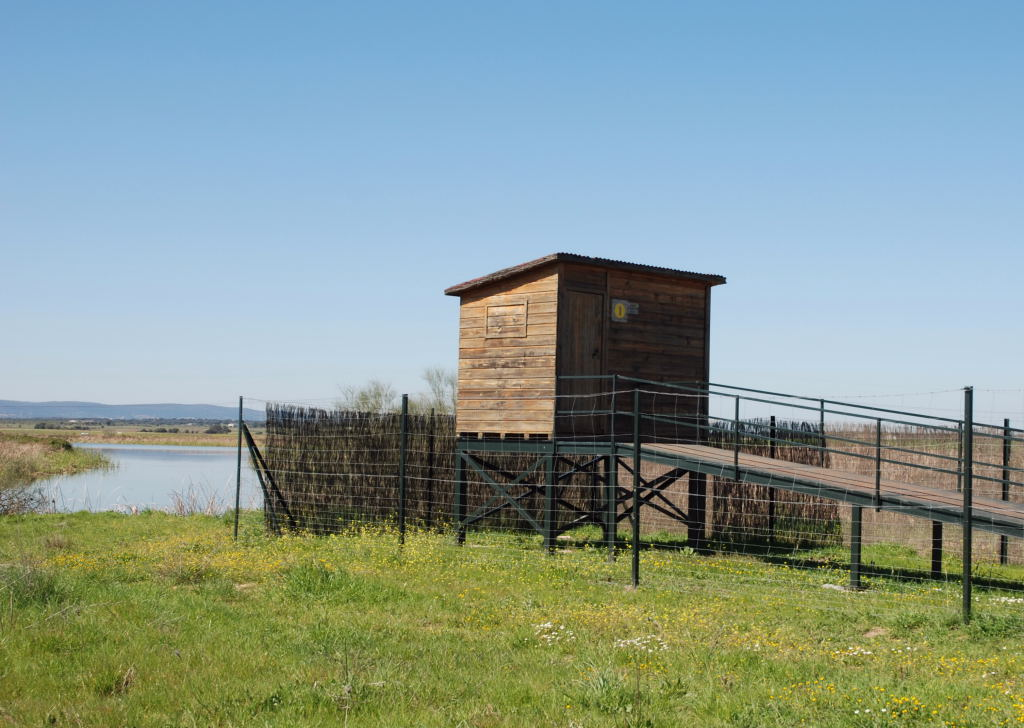
Bird hide

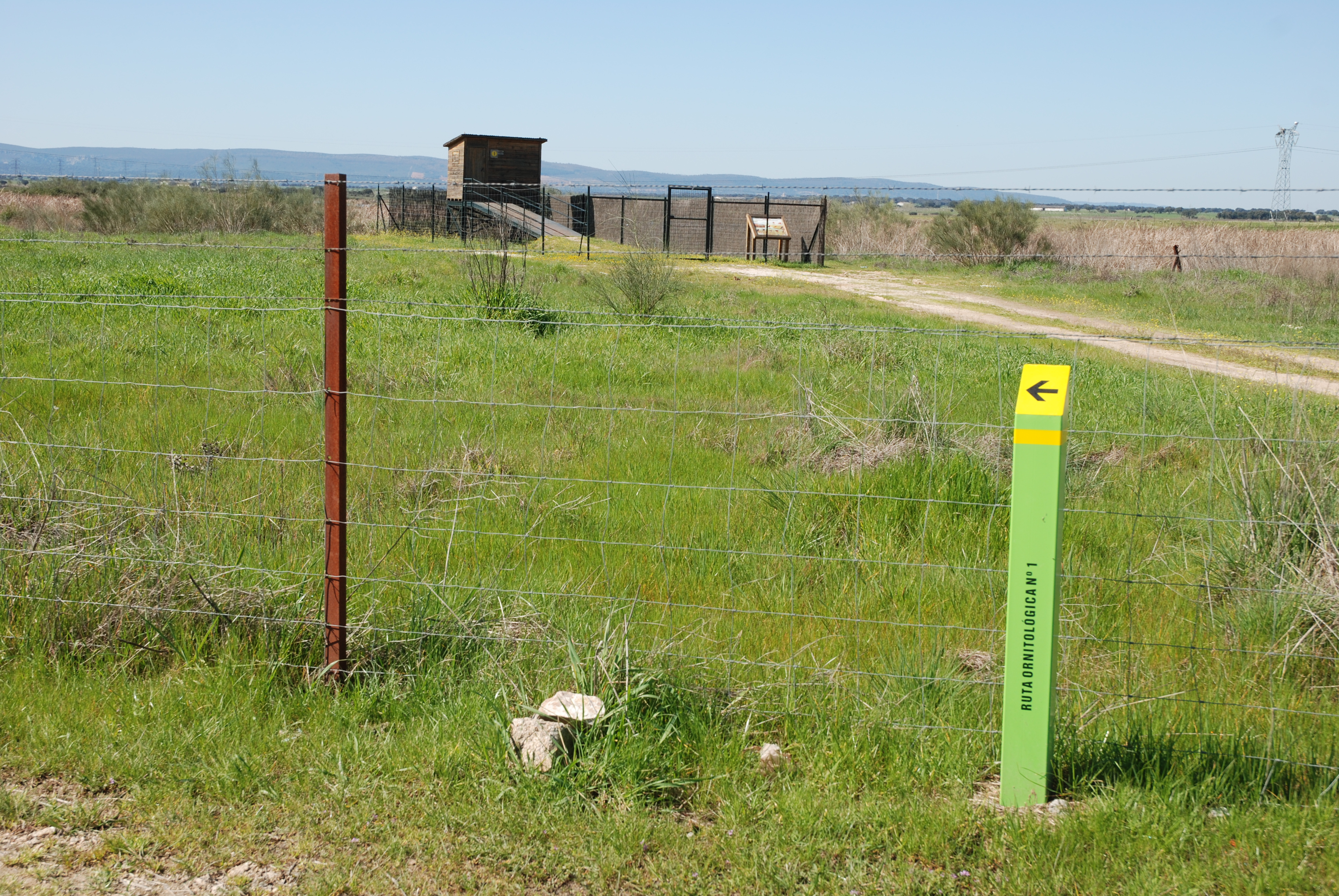
Route 1 marker

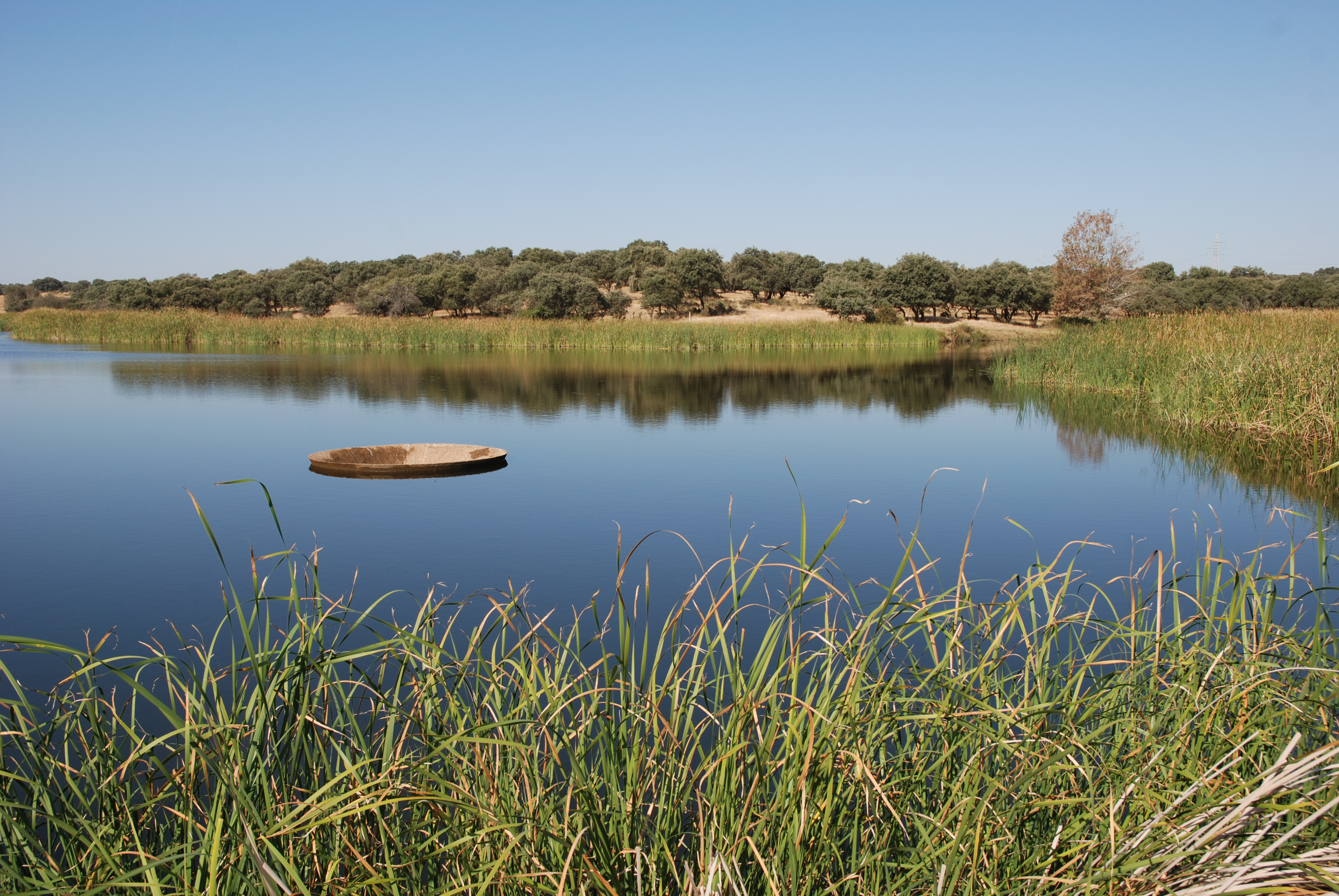
Pool on Route 2

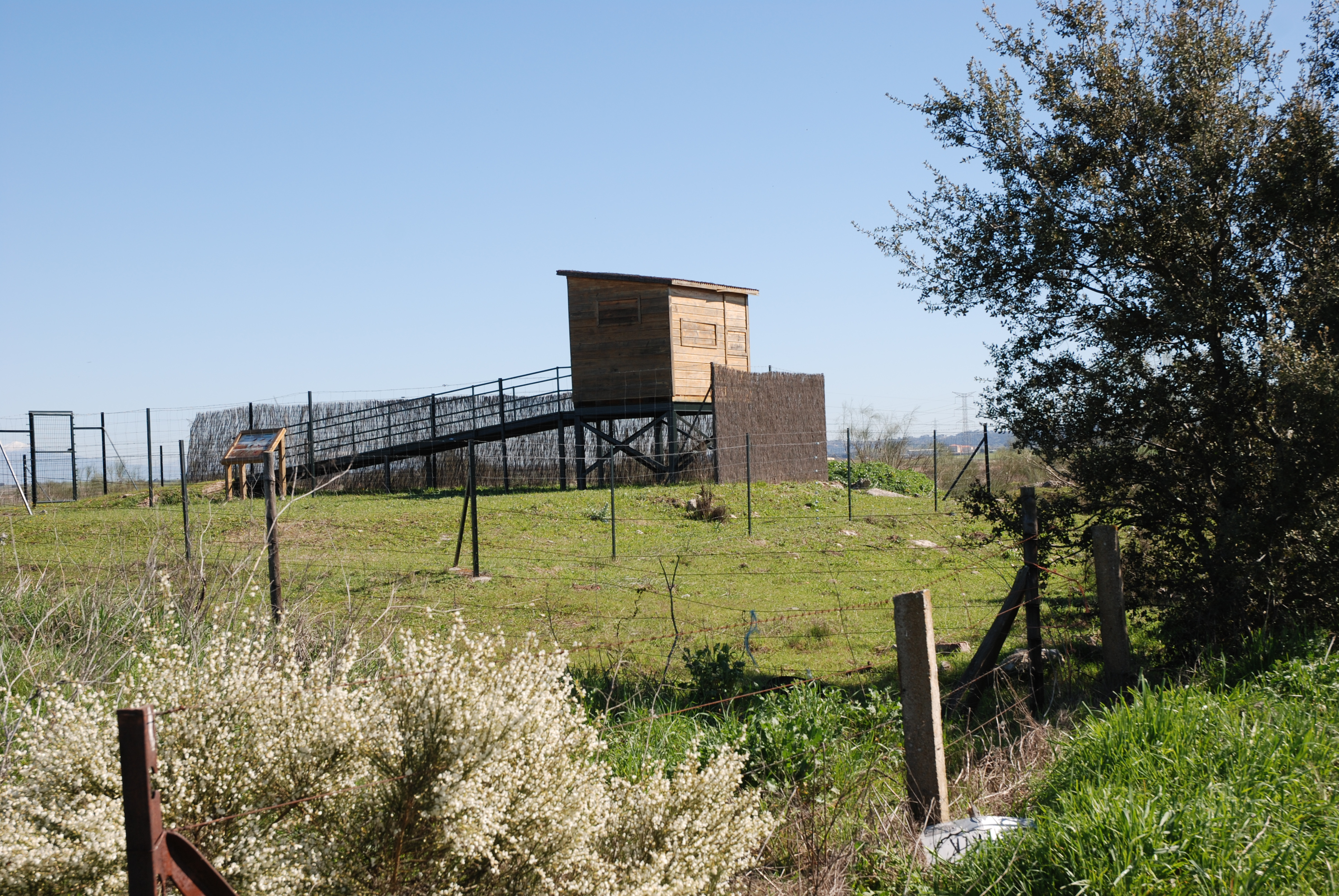
Bird hide

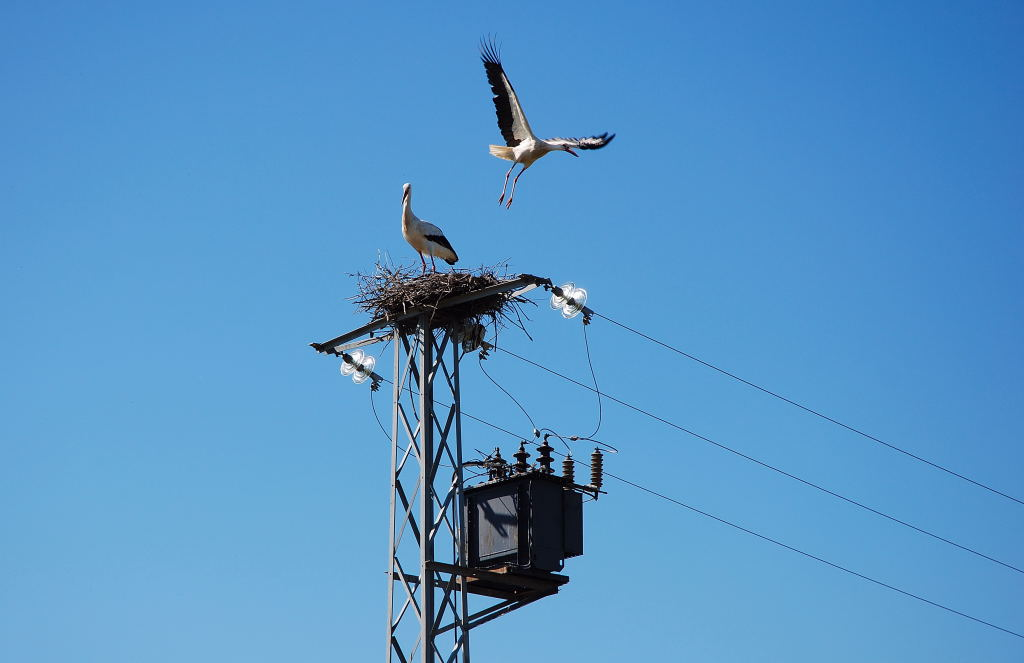
White storks near the reservoir

== Bibliography ==
- El embalse de Arrocampo, 1996, Ed. Central Nuclear Almaraz.
- Almaraz, un entorno para admirar, by Javier Briz and Óscar J. González; Madrid 2011; Ed. Centrales Nucleares Almaraz-Trillo. Photographs book with extraordinary birds pictures of Óscar J. González, photographer and biologist. This book is not sold in bookshops but it is possible to get it at Centrales Nucleares de Almaraz-Trillo, in: comunicacion@cnat.es
