= Romà Cuyàs i Sol =

Spanish sports executive

President of the Spanish Olympic Committee
- In office 1983–1984
- Preceded by: Jesús Hermida Cebreiro
- Succeeded by: Alfonso, Duke of Anjou and Cádiz

President of National Sports Council and State Secretary for Sports
- In office 1982–1987
- Preceded by: Jesús Hermida Cebreiro
- Succeeded by: Javier Gómez Navarro

Personal details
- Born: 24 November 1938 Barcelona, Catalonia, Spain
- Died: 27 December 2019 (aged 81) Barcelona, Spain
- Education: University of Barcelona
- Awards: Cross of Saint George (2017)

Romà Cuyàs i Sol (24 November 1938 – 27 December 2019) was a Spanish lawyer and sports and cultural executive, President of the Spanish Olympic Committee between 1983 and 1984 and commissioner of the 1992 Olympic Games in Barcelona.

== Career ==
Cuyàs i Sol graduated in Laws for the University of Barcelona and was an athlete of the CN Barcelona, of which he was also part of the board of directors as president of the athletics section. He entered the Catalan Athletics Federation in 1962 as a board member under the presidency of Miguel Arévalo, and was a member of the board of directors of the Royal Spanish Athletics Federation representing the first division clubs from 1980 to 1982.

Between 1982 and 1987, Cuyàs i Sol was Secretary of State for Sports of the Spanish Government and president of the National Sports Council where he had to lead the democratization of sport and sports federations after the dictatorship. He also chaired the Spanish Olympic Committee from 1983 to 1984, and was a member of life honor from 1984. He presided over the Catalan Athletics Federation from 2000 to 2012.

Cuyàs i Sol was also advisor-delegate of Ediciones 62, sole general director of the group of companies of Editorial Planeta and defender of the partner of Agrupació Mútua. As cultural promoter he was founder and first president of the Association of Publishers in Catalan Language between 1978 and 1982, vocal, accountant, treasurer and vice president of the Guild of Publishers of Catalonia between 1971 and 1982, and general director of Cultural promotion of the Generalitat of Catalonia between 1996 and 1997. He had an important role in the system of Catalan culture at the end of the Franco dictatorship and during the transition to democracy.

== Olympic Games in Barcelona ==
Cuyàs i Sol was the author of the feasibility study of the 1992 Olympic Games commissioned by the Barcelona City Council and published on 14 January 1982; first commissioner of the Barcelona 92 Olympic Project and first vice president of the Barcelona Olympic bid on behalf of the Spanish Government; member of the executive committee of COOB 92; Delegated Vice President of the Cultural Olympiad, and director of the Official Memory of the Barcelona Olympic Games 92.

== Decorations ==
- Gold medal for sporting merit of the City Council of Barcelona in 2014.
- Silver necklace of the International Olympic Committee.
- The Catalan Government awarded him in 2017 Creu de Sant Jordi by the hands of President of Catalonia Carles Puigdemont.
