= Luis E. Echávarri =

Spanish engineer

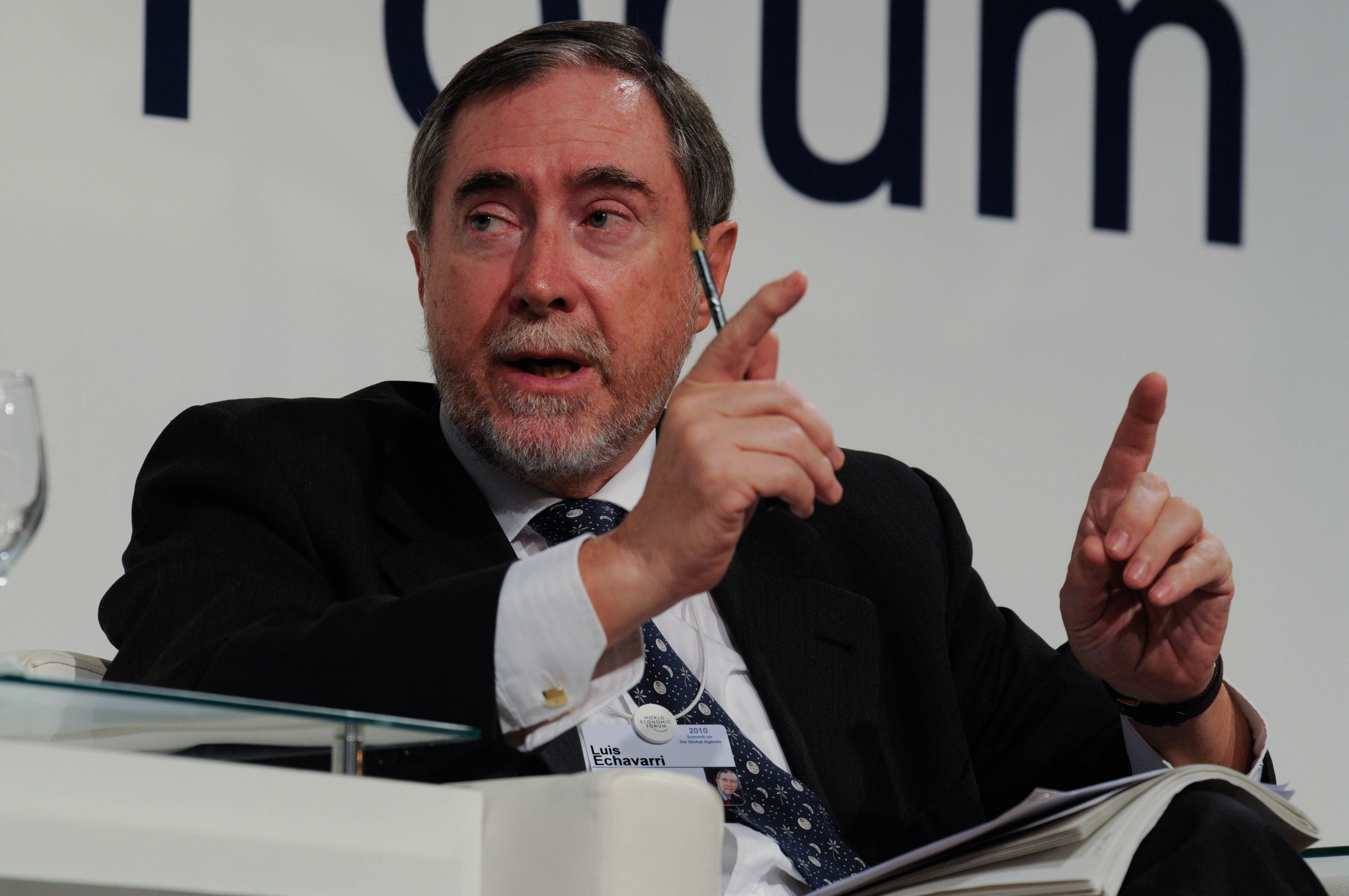
Luis Echávarri at the World Economic Forum Summit on the Global Agenda in 2010

Luis Echávarri is the former Director-General of the OECD Nuclear Energy Agency (NEA). He was born in 1949 in Bilbao, Spain. Mr. Echávarri has master's degrees from the Superior Technical School of Industrial Engineering of Bilbao University, and from the Faculty of Information Sciences of the Complutense University of Madrid. He is post-graduated from the Industrial Organization School of Madrid in Management, and is a Fellow of the College of Industrial Engineers of Madrid.

In 1975 Luis Echávarri joined Westinghouse Electric Company in Madrid, served also as a project manager of the Lemoniz, Sayago and Almaraz Nuclear Power Plant. In 1985 he became Technical Director of the Spanish Nuclear Safety Council (CSN), and in 1987 he was named Commissioner of the CSN. In 1995-1997 he held post of Director-General of the Spanish Nuclear Industry Forum.

In 1997 Luis Echávarri was appointed Director-General of NEA. He also represents the NEA on the Governing Board of the International Energy Agency (IEA), and he is a member of the International Atomic Energy Agency's International Nuclear Safety Advisory Group.

In 2009, Luis Echávarri run for the post of Director General of the International Atomic Energy Agency, but was not elected.
