= Spanish Anti-Doping Agency =

Spanish state agency

- Agencia Estatal Antidopaje
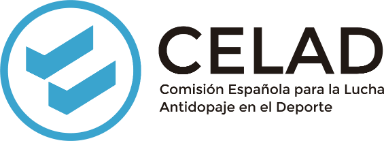

Agency overview
- Formed: February 8, 2008; 18 years ago
- Jurisdiction: Spain
- Headquarters: Madrid, Spain
- Annual budget: € 11.2 million, 2023
- Agency executive: Carlos Peralta Gallego, Director
- Parent department: Ministry of Education, Vocational Training and Sports
- Parent agency: Consejo Superior de Deportes
- Website: www.celad.gob.es

The Spanish Anti-Doping Agency, officially Spanish Commission for the Fight Against Doping in Sports (CELAD), is a Spanish state agency responsible for the protection of the right to health of all athletes and the protection of the right to participate in a competition without cheats.

For the purposes provided in the World Anti-Doping Code and in the internal regulations of the World Anti-Doping Agency, the commission is considered the National Anti-Doping Organization (NADOs).

Also, in its capacity as a body specialized in the investigation, control and execution of the policy against doping in sport, the commission is configured as the state public body for advice and collaboration with the law enforcement agencies, the judicial police and other public administrations with powers related to their scope of action and, if requested, with the judges and courts.

== History ==
=== Background ===
The first steps in the fight against doping in Spain were taken in the 1960s. The adoption of initiatives in this field by the Council of Europe and the International Olympic Committee (IOC), promoted the participation of Spain in the first meeting of the special study group on doping of athletes, which was held in 1963 at the proposal of the European body. Almost thirty years later, in October 1990, the Sports Act was passed, which was the starting point in the establishment of a framework for the repression of doping in sport unknown in the Spanish legal system until then. The application and development of the 1990 Act also meant the entry into operation of the National Anti-Doping Commission (CNA), the immediate predecessor of the current agency.

In 1999, the World Conference on Doping in Sport was held in Lausanne (Switzerland), and the need to deepen collaboration between public authorities and sports organizations was highlighted. This also meant the need to vary the doping eradication policies followed until then, directing them towards the creation and strengthening of an independent international body, which would establish common standards to combat doping and coordinate the efforts of sports organizations and public powers. As a result of this, the World Anti-Doping Agency (WADA) was created that same year and, in 2003, WADA drew up the first World Anti-Doping Code (WCA) and the international procedural standards that complement it, which constitute a set of rules and guidelines mandatory for the international sports movement.

On February 22, 2007, Organic Act 7/2006, of November 21, on health protection and the fight against doping in sport came into force, introducing a whole new set of measures to improve the prevention system and fight against doping in sport, highlighting the creation of a State Anti-Doping Agency (AEA). Among other responsibilities, this law entrusted the agency with carrying out controls on doping in sport and competencies on research policy in the area of prevention, doping control and protection of the health of athletes, with the aim of facilitating up-to-date knowledge of scientific and technological advances in this field, thus allowing an efficient approach to the fight against this phenomenon. Likewise, a previous law, the State Agencies Act of 18 July 2006, already provided for the creation of a State agency.

=== State agency ===
One year later, on February 8, 2008, the Spanish Anti-Doping Agency was officially created with the approval by the Council of Ministers of its internal rules. The internal rules, as established in the Organic Act 7/2006, it attached the Agency to the National Sports Council (Spanish: Consejo Superior de Deportes, CSD), whose head holds the Presidency of the Agency.

In 2013, Organic Act 3/2013, of June 20, on the protection of the health of athletes and the fight against doping in sports activity, was approved, a legislation that replaced the previous one from 2006. This law reformed the doping prevention system in accordance with the requirements of the new World Anti-Doping Code, toughening the sanctions and, in addition, renamed the agency as the Spanish Agency for Health Protection in Sport (AEPSAD). The law was modified in 2017 by Royal Decree-Law 3/2017, of February 17, which, adapting the law to the new World Anti-Doping Code of 2015, withdrew powers from the Agency in relation to health protection in sport, passing these directly to the National Sports Council (CSD) and leaving the Agency solely with pure anti-doping powers.

Thus, in mid-2021, the Council of Ministers approved and submitted to the Cortes Generales a new draft bill to combat doping in sport. Again, this project was aimed at adapting national legislation to the new World Anti-Doping Code of 2021 and, among other things, renamed the State Agency as the Spanish Commission for the Fight Against Doping in Sport, since the current name did not correspond with its real powers, which were modified in 2017. The law, approved by the Cortes Generales at the end of the year, entered into force on December 30, 2021.

== How the Agency acts ==
The main objective of the Agency is to ensure that the sport is carried out in a healthy and untrammeled way, for this purpose:

- It has a system of health protection in sport and in sports activity.
- It dissuades traps and doping through education, doping control and the agency impulses projects that help in the understanding of this social scourge and its eradication.
- It detects anti-doping policy violations through doping control programs and drug research programs.
- It enforces the anti-doping rules sanctioning any infraction of the same, applying the current legislation.

== Structure ==
- Director of the Agency.
  - Secretary of direction.
  - Director of the anti-doping control laboratory.
  - Department of Education and Scientific Research.
  - Department of anti-doping control.
  - Department of sport and health.

== Directors ==
1. Francisco Javier Martín del Burgo (2008–2013)
2. Ana Muñoz Merino (2012–2013)
3. Manuel Quintanar Díez (2013–2014)
4. Enrique Gómez Bastida (2014–2017)
5. José Luis Terreros Blanco (2017–2024)
6. Silvia Calzón (2024)
7. Carlos Peralta Gallego (2024–present)

== See also ==
- World Anti-Doping Agency
- Spanish National Health System
- Ministry of Health
- Spanish National Research Council
- State Research Agency
