= Carlos Peralta (swimmer) =

Spanish swimmer

Director of the Spanish Anti-Doping Agency
- Incumbent
- Assumed office 2 October 2024
- Monarch: Felipe VI
- Prime Minister: Pedro Sánchez
- Preceded by: Silvia Calzón

Personal details
- Born: Carlos Peralta Gallego; 30 January 1994 (age 32)
- Occupation: Swimmer; Physician

Carlos Peralta Gallego (born 30 January 1994) is a Spanish swimmer and physician. He competed in the men's 200 metre butterfly event at the 2016 Summer Olympics. Peralta is openly gay. Since October 2024, he has been the director of the Spanish Anti-Doping Agency. He graduated in Medicine from the Complutense University of Madrid.
