= Almaraz Nuclear Power Plant =

Nuclear power station at Almaraz in Spain

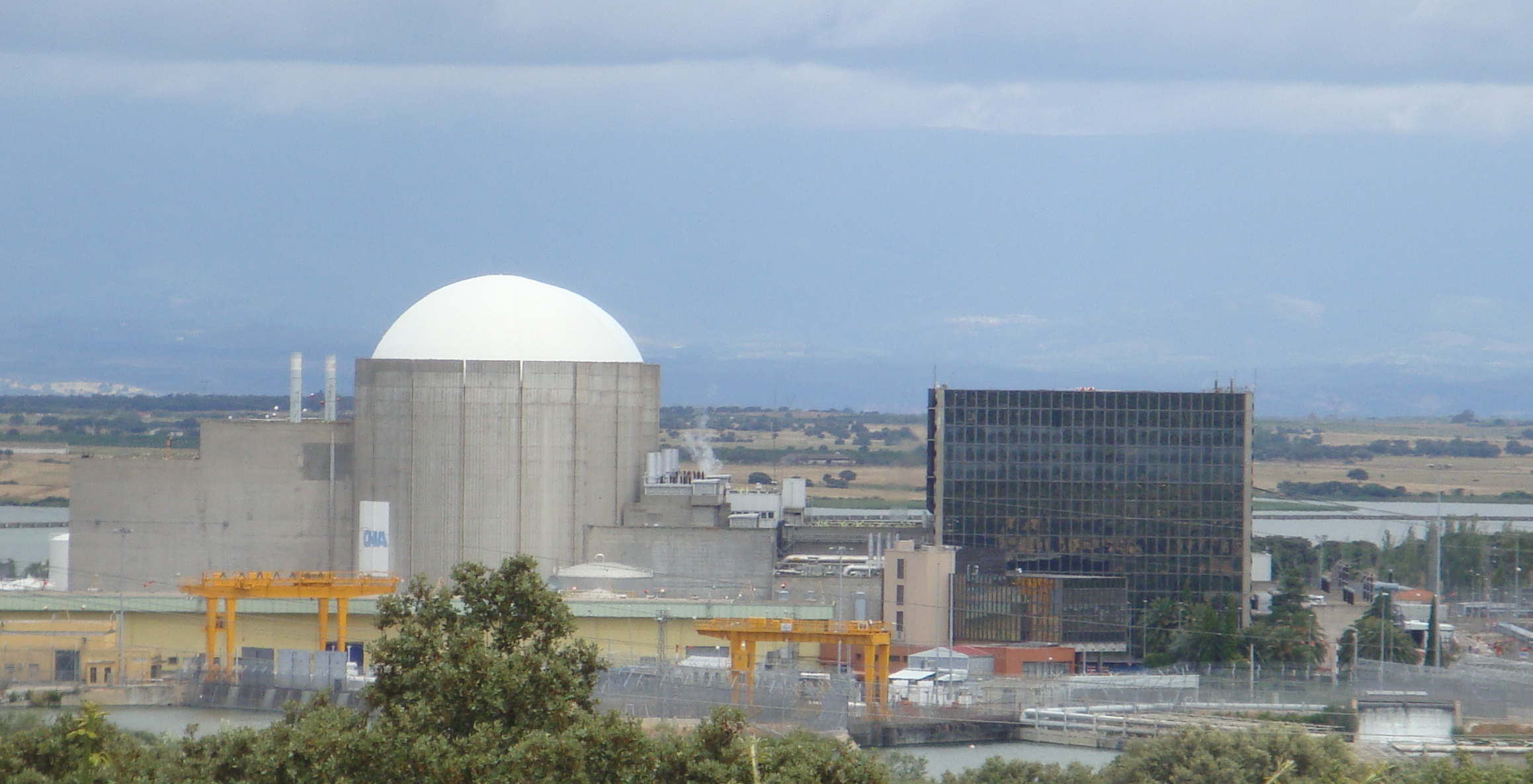
- The Almaraz Nuclear Power Plant
- Country: Spain
- Coordinates: 39°48′29″N 5°41′49″W
- Status: Operational
- Construction began: 1973
- Commission date: 1 September 1983
- Decommission date: 8 June 2030
- Owners: Iberdrola (53% of both), Endesa, Union Fenosa
- Operator: CNAT
- Thermal capacity: 2 × 2947 MW_{th}

Power generation
- Units operational: 1 × 1011 MW; 1 × 1006 MW
- Make and model: 2 × WH 3-loop
- Nameplate capacity: 2017 MW
- Capacity factor: 85.88%
- Annual net output: 15,174 GW·h (2016)

External links
- Website: https://www.cnat.es/almaraz-presentacion.php
- Commons: Related media on Commons

Almaraz Nuclear Power Plant is a nuclear power station at Almaraz in Spain which uses the Tagus River, that runs into Portugal, for cooling.

It consists of two pressurized water reactors (PWRs) of 1011 and 1006 MWe.

== Arrocampo reservoir ==
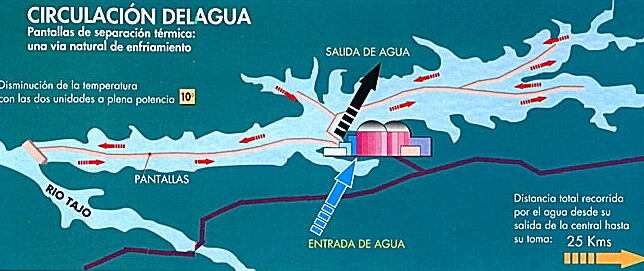
Water circulation in Arrocampo Reservoir

Cooling for the Almaraz nuclear power plant was the principal reason for the construction of the Arrocampo Reservoir in 1976.

The water is taken from the Tagus River and covers a U-shaped circuit of 25 km which allows the cooling of the heat generated by the two nuclear reactors of the plant. (See the illustration of the water circulation in Arrocampo)

The walls separating the hot and cold flows (pantallas de separación térmica in Spanish) (PST) are 11 km long and 8 m high.

== History ==
Late 1960 - 1970s: Initial planning for the facility began in the late 1960s. Ground movement started in 1972, and the first concrete was poured in 1973. Spanish companies accounted for roughly 81% of its construction and setup.

On September 1, 1983 Unit I began commercial operation. Unit II followed in 1983/1984. The reactors occupied an area of 1683 hectares.

In 1975 Luis E. Echávarri was made project manager of the plant. In 1985 he became technical director of the Spanish Nuclear Safety Council (CSN), and in 1987 he was named Commissioner of the CSN.

As of 2017 Spain had approved a nuclear waste warehouse at Almaraz without carrying out any consultations or impact studies. Portugal has taken the matter to the EU, protests planned on 12 January at Spanish consulates were organised by Movimiento Ibérico Antinuclear, which coincided with a meeting between Portuguese and Spanish delegates in Madrid, which ended in deadlock and Portugal to complain to the EU that Spain ignored the potential cross-border impact with no studies being carried out, which is against European Union rules.

Spanish secretary of State for the EU Jorge Toledo Albiñana has said work will start regardless of Portugal's complaints, and uranium fuel assemblies that will remain radioactive for the next 300 years will be stored on site.

In May 2017 the Portuguese Parliament approved the Ecologist Party "The Greens" motion to request the closure of Spain's Almaraz nuclear plant during the next Iberian summit. Stating that after 2020 the plant should be shut down, the Greens asked the government to take a "resolute position, for the facility, located 100 kilometres from the Portuguese border. Environmentalists have warned that the plan to build a nuclear waste warehouse site next to the power plant almost certainly indicates that Spain plans to extend the life of the Almaraz power plant beyond the year 2020.

In August 2026, the spanish Government authorised an extension of Almaraz's operational licence through the Ministry for Ecological Transition, publishing the resolution in the Official State Gazette. Under the extension, Unit I may continue operating until June 2030,while Unit II receives a 19-month extension beyond its 2028 deadline. The Nuclear Safety Council had issued a favourable report on 16 July 2026 following a formal request submitted by the plant's co-owners (Iberdrola, Endesa and Naturgy) in October 2025. The government cited geopolitical instability in the Middle East and the resulting volatility in natural gas prices as the primary justification, noting that the extension is projected to reduce gas-fired generation by approximately 7% while having a minimal impact on renewable energy output, an estimated 1.4% reduction by 2030. Spain's overall nuclear phase-out deadline remains set for 2035.

== Safety record ==
On the 28 January 2016, the Spanish Nuclear Safety Council inspectors found serious failings in the water pump engines at the plant, which have potential operational issues of the cooling system and could pose a serious risk to local people and the environment in Spain and in neighboring Portugal. These two incidents were "classified at [INES] level 1, both relating to inoperabilities on one train of the components heat exchangers". Greenpeace has labelled the plant as an "extreme case" in its study on the application of minimum safety standards introduced in Europe after the Fukushima accident. Miguel Arias Cañete responded that the CSN "carried out an assessment and reached the conclusion that the Almaraz power plant is operated safely."

On 21 September 2016, defective parts were used on unit 1's second and third steam generators and on unit 2's third steam generator, as well as the rim of the reactor lid in unit 2. It had already been reported that the water pump engines had been stopped twice, the plant's cooling system was reported as not 100% reliable.

On 10 April 2017, the Spanish Nuclear Safety Council issued a statement stating there was an unscheduled stoppage of the main number two pump at 9:57 am Spanish time (8:57 am Lisbon time).

== See also ==
- Nuclear power in Spain
