= Nuclear Energy Agency =

Intergovernmental agency under the OECD

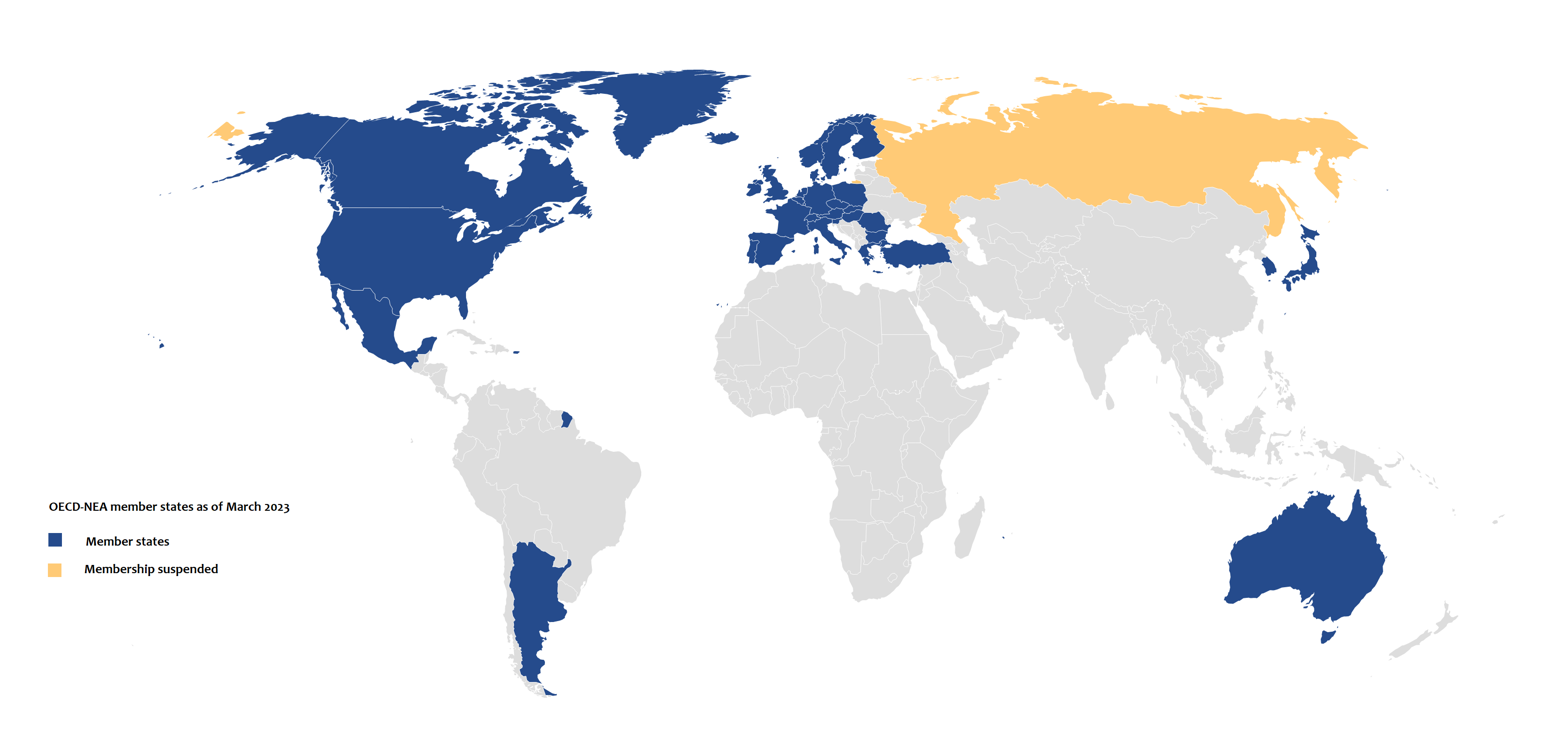
- NEA member countries
- Secretariat: Paris, France
- Membership: 33 member countries

Leaders
  - Director-General: William D. Magwood, IV
- Establishment: 1 February 1958; (as the ENEA)
- Website www.oecd-nea.org

The Nuclear Energy Agency (NEA) is an intergovernmental agency that is organized under the Organisation for Economic Co-operation and Development (OECD). Originally formed on 1 February 1958 with the name European Nuclear Energy Agency (ENEA)—the United States participated as an Associate Member—the name was changed on 20 April 1972 to its current name after Japan became a member.

The mission of the NEA is to "assist its member countries in maintaining and further developing, through international co-operation, the scientific, technological and legal bases required for the safe, environmentally friendly and economical use of nuclear energy for peaceful purposes."

== History ==
The creation of the European Nuclear Energy Agency (ENEA) was agreed by the OEEC Council of Ministers on December 20, 1957.

== Members ==
NEA currently consists of 33 countries from Europe, North America and the Asia-Pacific region. In 2021, Bulgaria accessioned to NEA as its most recent member. In 2022, following Russia's invasion of Ukraine, Russia's membership was suspended.

- Argentina
- Australia
- Austria
- Belgium
- Bulgaria
- Canada
- Czech Republic
- Denmark
- Finland
- France
- Germany
- Greece
- Hungary
- Iceland
- Ireland
- Italy
- Japan
- Luxembourg
- Mexico
- Netherlands
- Norway
- Poland
- Portugal
- Romania
- Slovakia
- Slovenia
- South Korea
- Spain
- Sweden
- Switzerland
- Turkey
- United Kingdom
- United States

Together they account for approximately 85% of the world's installed nuclear capacity. Nuclear power accounts for almost a quarter of the electricity produced in NEA Member countries. The NEA works closely with the International Atomic Energy Agency (IAEA) in Vienna and with the European Commission in Brussels.

Within the OECD, there is close co-ordination with the International Energy Agency and the Environment Directorate, as well as contacts with other directorates, as appropriate.

== Areas of work ==
- Nuclear safety and regulation
- Nuclear energy development
- Radioactive waste management
- Radiation protection and public health
- Nuclear law and liability
- Nuclear science
- Data bank
- Information and communication
- European Nuclear Energy Tribunal

== Structure ==
Since 1 September 2014, the Director-General of the NEA is William D Magwood, IV, who replaced Luis E. Echávarri on this post. The NEA Secretariat serves seven specialised standing technical committees under the leadership of the Steering Committee for Nuclear Energy—the governing body of the NEA—which reports directly to the OECD Council.

The standing technical committees, representing each of the seven major areas of the Agency's programme, are composed of member country experts who are both contributors to the programme of work and beneficiaries of its results. The approach is highly cost-efficient as it enables the Agency to pursue an ambitious programme with a relatively small staff that co-ordinates the work. The substantive value of the standing technical committees arises from the numerous important functions they perform, including: providing a forum for in-depth exchanges of technical and programmatic information; stimulating development of useful information by initiating and carrying out co-operation/research on key problems; developing common positions, including "consensus opinions", on technical and policy issues; identifying areas where further work is needed and ensuring that NEA activities respond to real needs; organising joint projects to enable interested countries to carry out research on particular issues on a cost-sharing basis.

== NEA Annual Report ==
The NEA Annual Report, issued in English and French, is a definitive guide to the agency's yearly undertakings, major publications, and the evolving global nuclear energy sector. It aims to equip governments, stakeholders, and industry specialists with in-depth analysis and foresight on nuclear technology developments.

The 2022 edition highlights that there were 423 nuclear reactors in operation worldwide, providing a total of 379 GWe. NEA member countries manage 312 of these reactors, constituting roughly 80% of the global capacity. Additionally, the year witnessed the grid connection of six new reactors, contributing 7,360 MWe, and the construction of 57 reactors, reflecting a dynamic and expanding nuclear industry.

== See also ==
- International Energy Agency
- International Atomic Energy Agency
- European Organization for Nuclear Research
