= Andalusian School of Public Health =

Public institution

Coordinates: 37.19017°N 3.59403°W

Location
- Cuesta del observatorio. Campus de Cartuja. Granada 18011; España; Granada; Spain

Information
- Established: 1985
- Website: Official website

The Andalusian School of Public Health (Spanish: Escuela Andaluza de Salud Pública, EASP) is a Spanish public institution which provides training, consultancy and research services for the health care sector. It is located in Granada (Spain), on the University campus. It is a state-owned enterprise, promoted by the Regional Government of Andalusia.
