= Nuclear Safety Council (Spain) =

Nuclear regulatory agency in Spain

- Consejo de Seguridad Nuclear
- Abbreviation: CSN
- Type: Nuclear regulatory agency
- Purpose: Nuclear safety and radiation protection
- Location: Spain

The Nuclear Safety Council (Spanish: Consejo de Seguridad Nuclear; CSN) is the independent Spanish institution of the General State Administration, whose main purpose is to ensure nuclear safety and the radiation protection of people and the environment. Its structure, functions, competencies and organization were extensively modified in October 2007 with law reforms. It is also a member of the Western European Nuclear Regulators' Association.

It also provides the operational data of nuclear power plants located in Spanish territory, reporting the mode of operation, thermal power, electric power, primary pressure, primary temperature, nuclear reactors, among others. All relevant facts relating to incidents in these facilities are registered.

== History ==
In 1975 Luis E. Echávarri was made project manager of the Almaraz Nuclear Power Plant. In 1985 he became technical director of the Spanish Nuclear Safety Council (CSN), and in 1987 he was named Commissioner of the CSN.

Professor Elvira Romera became a member of the council in.March 2019.

In 2024 senior staff of the council met the king.
