= Francisco Villar García-Moreno =

Spanish politician

Francisco José Villar Garcia-Moreno (February 25, 1948, in Madrid – October 26, 2011, in Madrid) was a Spanish politician of the People's Party (Spanish: Partido Popular).

== Biography ==
Although born in Madrid, much of his career was spent in Galicia. He earned a Bachelor of Medicine and Surgery degree from the University of Santiago de Compostela.

His political career was closely linked to that of Mariano Rajoy. In 1990, he was appointed Provincial Delegate of the Ministry of Health of the Government of Galicia in Pontevedra and 1991-1996 served as Director General of the Galician Health Service. In 1996, after the victory of the People's Party in the general election, he was appointed Secretary of State for Public Administration in the Ministry of Public Administration, which was led by Rajoy. In subsequent years, he was appointed to several departments of the Central Government, where Rajoy was in charge.

He died on October 26, 2011, after a long illness.

== Awards ==
- Gold Medal of Sporting Merit (2002).
