= Campo Arañuelo =

- Comarca
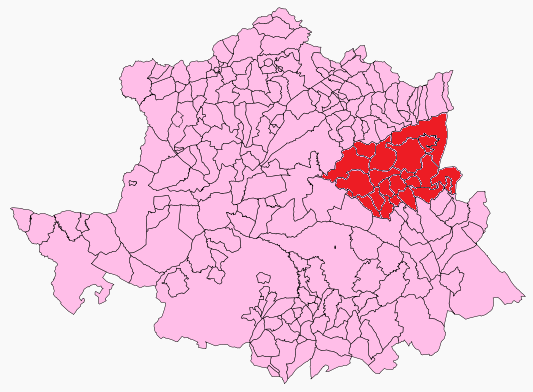
- Coordinates: 39°50′46″N 5°36′28″W
- Country: Spain
- Autonomous community: Extremadura
- Province: Cáceres

Area
  - Total: 1,491 km^{2} (576 sq mi)

Population (2008)
  - Total: 37,644
  - Density: 25.25/km^{2} (65.39/sq mi)

Campo Arañuelo is a comarca in Cáceres, Extremadura, Spain. It contains the municipalities of Almaraz, Belvís de Monroy, Berrocalejo, Bohonal de Ibor, Casas de Miravete, Casatejada, El Gordo, Higuera de Albalat, Majadas, Mesas de Ibor, Millanes, Navalmoral de la Mata, Peraleda de la Mata, Romangordo, Rosalejo, Saucedilla, Serrejón, Talayuela, Tiétar, Toril, Valdecañas de Tajo, Valdehúncar. Notable for the Dolmen de Guadalperal, the "Spanish Stonehenge".

== Sources ==
- La Gaceta del Arañuelo - Las noticias del Campo Arañuelo
- Web oficial de la comarca del Campo Arañuelo
- Web oficial de la Mancomunidad de Municipios del Campo Arañuelo
- Noticias del Campo Arañuelo en NavalmoralDigital.com
