= Higuera =

Higuera Higuera de Albalat
- Municipality
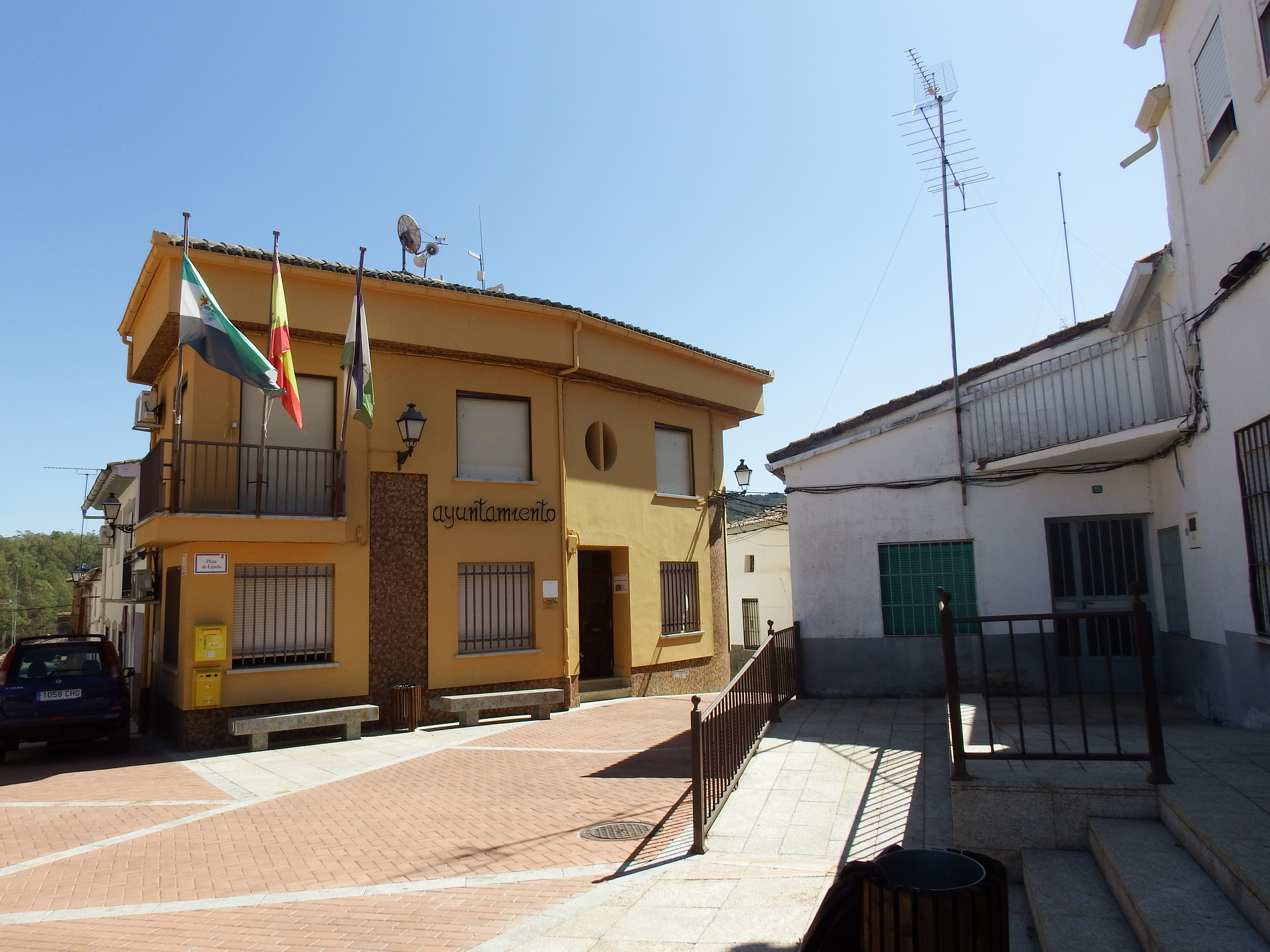
- Town hall

- Flag Coat of arms

- Location in Extremadura
- Coordinates: 39°43′40.78″N 5°39′17.47″W
- Country: Spain
- Community: Extremadura
- Province: Cáceres
- Comarca: Campo Arañuelo

Government
  - Mayor: Victorino González Fernández

Area
  - Total: 40.54 km^{2} (15.65 sq mi)
- Elevation: 480 m (1,570 ft)

Population (2025-01-01)
  - Total: 102
  - Density: 2.52/km^{2} (6.52/sq mi)
- Demonym: Higuereño/a
- Postal code: 10359
- Website: Official website

Higuera, also known as Higuera de Albalat, is a Spanish municipality of the Province of Cáceres, in the autonomous community of Extremadura. The municipality covers an area of 40.54 square kilometres (15.65 sq mi) and as of 2011 had a population of 115 people.

== History ==
Its name comes from the old Arab medina of Makhada Albalat (or Madinat Albalat, meaning "way" or "road"), an archaeological site located next to the town. Among its historical attractions, Higuera has the ruins of an Islamic watchtower and its citadel, dating back to the 10th/11th centuries, located on Castil Oreja mountain.

== Geography ==
The municipality, part of the judicial district of Navalmoral de la Mata, is located in the Monfragüe National Park and crossed by the river Tagus in its northern corner. It borders with the municipalities of Almaraz, Campillo de Deleitosa, Casas de Miravete, Deleitosa, Romangordo and Valdecañas de Tajo.

The town is 55 km far from Trujillo, 79 from Plasencia, 82 from Guadalupe, 100 from Cáceres, 141 from Mérida and 216 from Madrid.

== See also ==
- List of municipalities in Cáceres
