= Saucedilla =

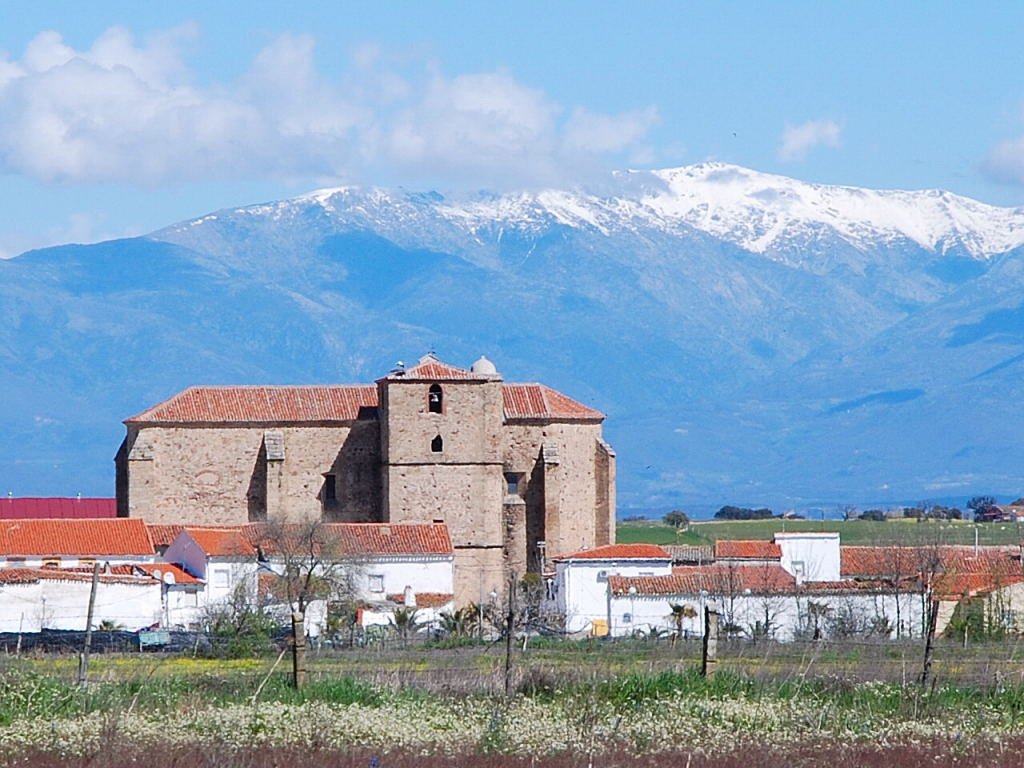
- Church of St John the Baptist, Saucedilla with the Sierra de Gredos snow-covered behind

- Coat of arms

- Location in Spain
- Coordinates: 39°51′08.46″N 5°40′40.82″W
- Country: Spain
- Autonomous community: Extremadura
- Province: Cáceres
- Comarca: Campo Arañuelo
- Municipality: Saucedilla

Government
  - Mayor: Urbano García Díaz (Independent)

Area
  - Total: 60 km^{2} (23 sq mi)
- Elevation: 258 m (846 ft)

Population (2025-01-01)
  - Total: 1,002
  - Density: 17/km^{2} (43/sq mi)
- Demonym: naveros
- Time zone: UTC+1 (CET)
  - Summer (DST): UTC+2 (CEST)
- Website: http://www.saucedilla.es

Saucedilla (Spanish pronunciation: [sawθeˈðiʎa]) is a municipality located in the province of Cáceres, Extremadura, Spain. It belongs to the Campo Arañuelo County (Comarca del Campo Arañuelo), the capital of which is Navalmoral de la Mata.

According to the 2010 census (INE), it had a population of 859 inhabitants.

== Geography and nature ==
The situation of Saucedilla is impressive. In the north, the vast bulk of the Sierra de Gredos and the Tiétar River; in the south and west, the Miravete Sierra (Casas de Miravete), the Tagus River (Tajo in Spanish) and the Serrejón Sierra. The climate is Mediterranean. The village stands in an extensive plain of clayey grounds.

=== Dehesa ===
The municipality is surrounded by immense dehesas. A dehesa is a light wood of holm oaks (Quercus ilex) or cork oaks (Quercus suber). There, the breeding (animal husbandry) of cattle, sheep (for meat and wool), goats (for meat and cheese), and pigs, (Iberian pig) for meat like jamón ibérico (Iberian ham) and jamón serrano, are common. The breeding of fighting bulls (toro bravo in Spanish) is also widespread. There are some ganaderías of these wild bulls in Saucedilla (Cerro Alto, La Anguila) and others nearby villages like Casatejada or Toril.

=== Arrocampo Reservoir ===
Arrocampo Reservoir was created at 1976 to cool the turbines of the Almaraz nuclear power plant, which is near Saucedilla. With a system of dams and dikes, the water, taken from Tagus river, covers a circuit of 11 km which allow the cooling of these turbines.

- Biomass (ecology): there are a considerable masses of phytoplankton and zooplankton thanks to the eutrophication and oxygenation of waters. The bulrush (Typha latifolia) vegetation is dominant in Arrocampo. It allows the proliferation of birds and little mammals.

- Fishes: barbels (Barbus barbus), common carps (Cyprinus carpio), tenches (Tinca tinca), big largemouth bass (Micropterus salmoides) (almost 50 cm).

- Actually, it is an important Special Protection Area (SPA) for wild birds. (In Spanish: Zona Especial de Protección para las Aves, ZEPA.) Many migrating as well as permanent birds can be watched in the reservoir waters and their vicinity: white stork (Ciconia ciconia), lesser kestrel (Falco naumanni), purple heron (Ardea purpurea), squacco heron (Ardeola ralloides), black-crowned night heron (Nycticorax nycticorax), little bittern (Ixobrychus minutus), osprey (Pandion haliaetus), cattle egret (Bubulcus ibis), great cormorant (Phalacrocorax carbo), purple swamphen (Porphyrio porphyrio). This is, perhaps, the bird symbol of Arrocampo Reservoir SPA). The list is practically endless.

=== Cañada Real Leonesa Occidental (main droveway of Western León) ===
Saucedilla was always a land of sheep. (Its coat of arms has a head of ram.) Extremadura (and Saucedilla), was a passing and transhumance land from the Middle Age. In medieval Spain, there were droving flocks of sheep on the largest scale, which were carefully organized by the system of the Mesta, crossing Extremadura and other Spanish regions. These long distance movements of sheep and cattle were made along drovers road called cañadas reales in Castile, cabañeras in Aragon, carreradas in Catalonia. The Cañada Real Leonesa Occidental cross Saucedilla by the south, near the cemetery. There is a country house, close the graveyard, for shepherds and cowherds who cover the droveway still today.

=== Irrigated lands ===
- Long ago, the economic activity of Saucedilla was based only on traditional agriculture. During centuries, there was a subsistence farming (dry farming), with also the breeding of sheep, goats, cattle and pigs. This agriculture has produced cereals for years and years in Saucedilla lands: wheat, barley, oats, rye, chickpeas, broad beans and root vegetables like turnips. Also olives and wine.

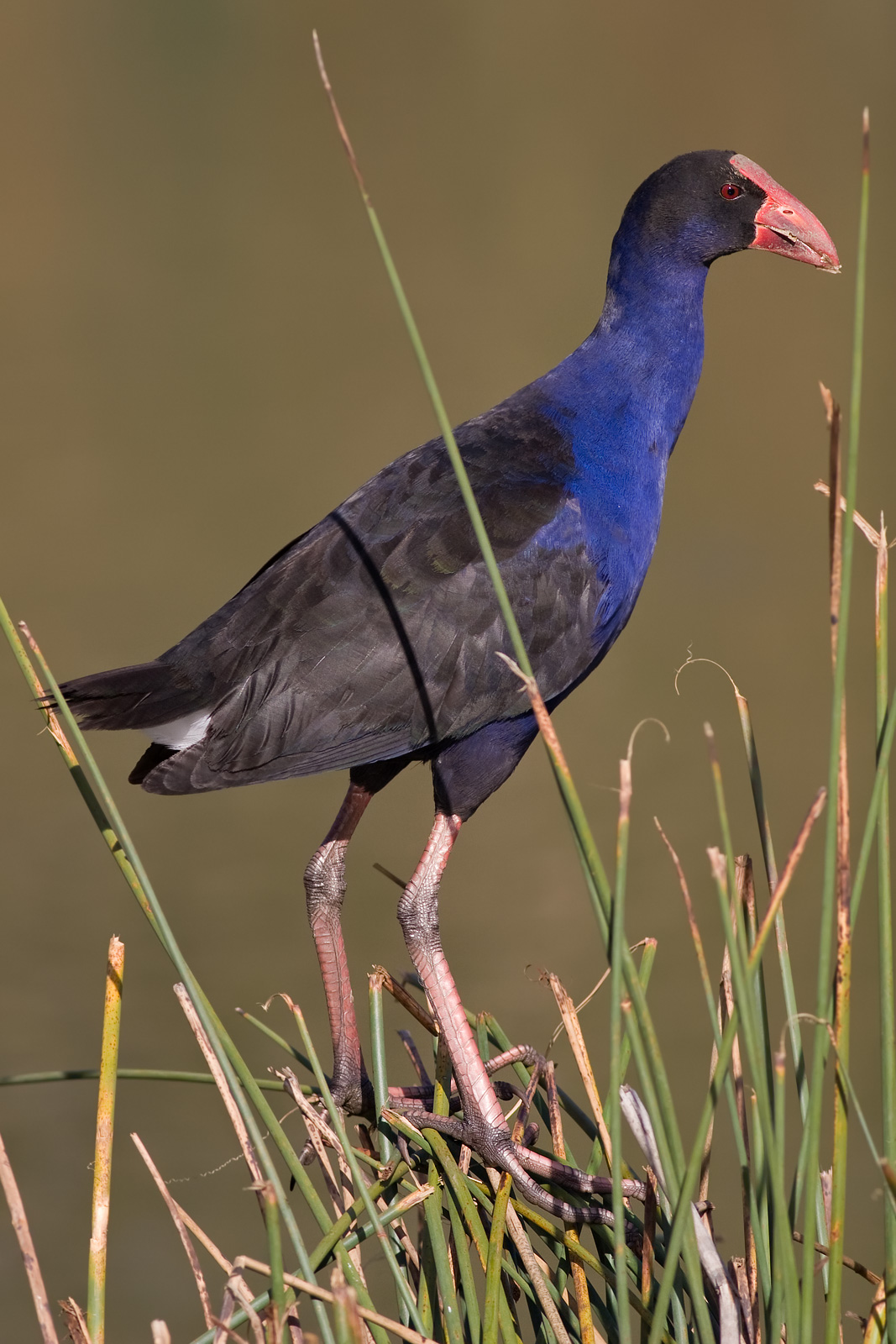
Purple swamphen, a characteristic wild bird of Arrocampo

- The new irrigation farming: the Valdecañas Reservoir upon the Tagus (on southeast of the municipality), and the construction of many channels, were made possible to irrigate many farmlands of Saucedilla. Fodder for cows and sheep, fruits like tomatoes, pimientos, bell peppers, peaches, etc., are produced because of the arrival of water in the 1980s.

=== Special Protection Areas ===
There are two Special Protection Areas (SPAs) in Saucedilla. They were created in 2005.

- Arrocampo Reservoir Special Protection Area. The list of wild birds of Arrocampo Reservoir SPA is really very large.

- Lesser Kestrel Colonies of Saucedilla Special Protection Area: it is located on the parish church of Saucedilla. 17 pairs of lesser kestrels (Latin name Falco naumanni, in Spanish cernícalos) were recorded in 2005 in the putlog holes of its walls.

=== Arrocampo Ornithological Park ===
There are two ornithological routes marked with wooden blazes and an Information Office near the municipal swimming pools in the south entry of the village.

- Route 1: Arrocampo Reservoir Route. This route has 4 bird hides.
- Route 2: Cerro Alto Route: 1 hide

=== Pictures of the area around Saucedilla ===
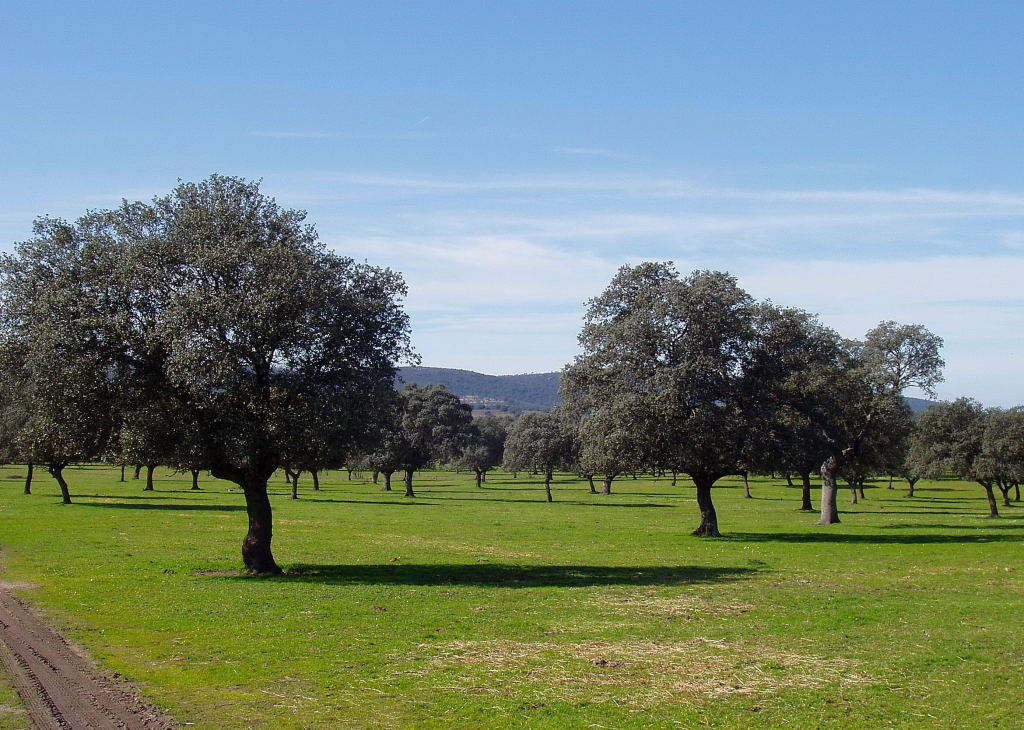
Dehesa (holm oak wood) nearby Saucedilla

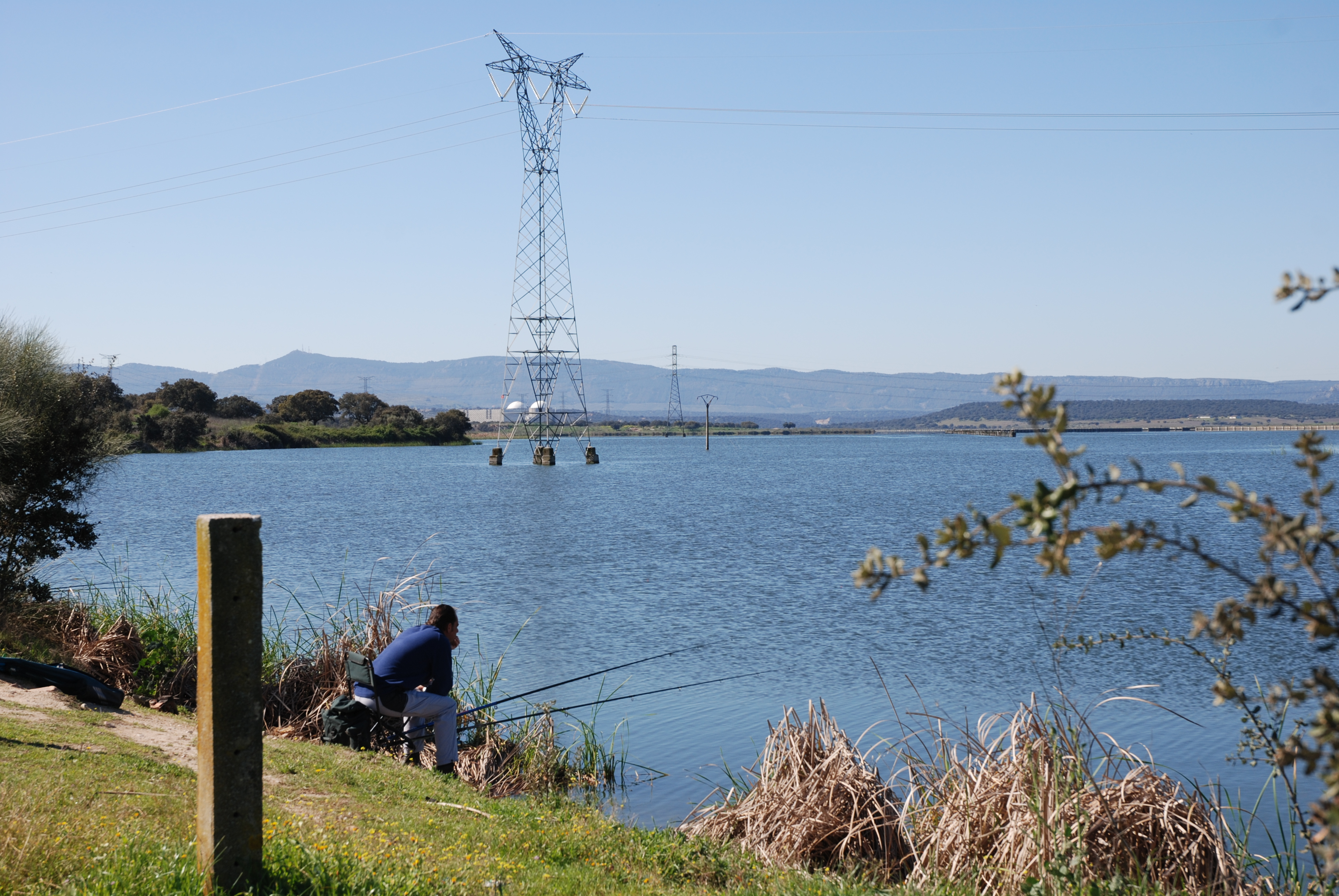
Arrocampo Reservoir

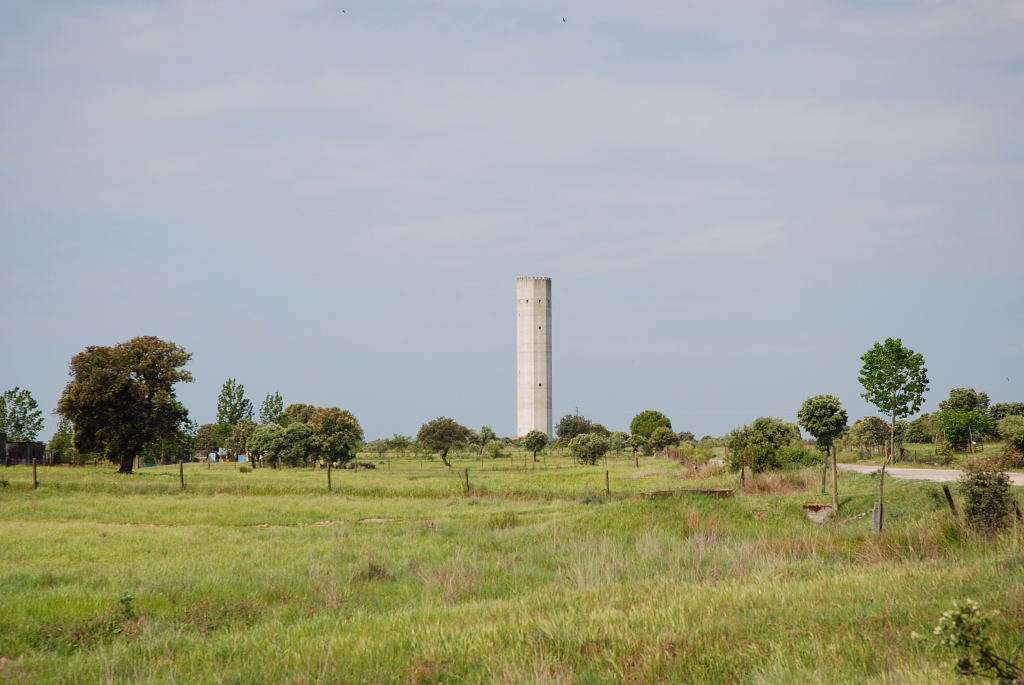
Elevation water tower for irrigation

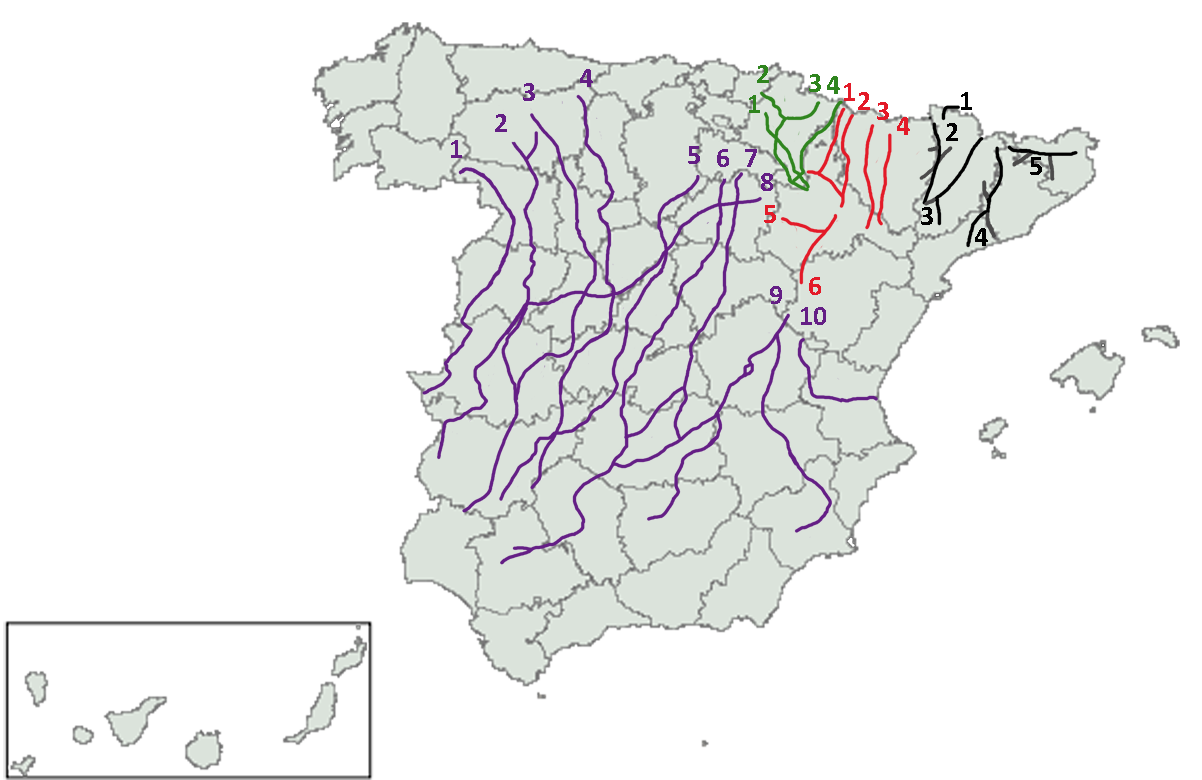
Main drovers roads of Spain. Cañada Real Leonesa Occidental is nº3. It cross by Saucedilla

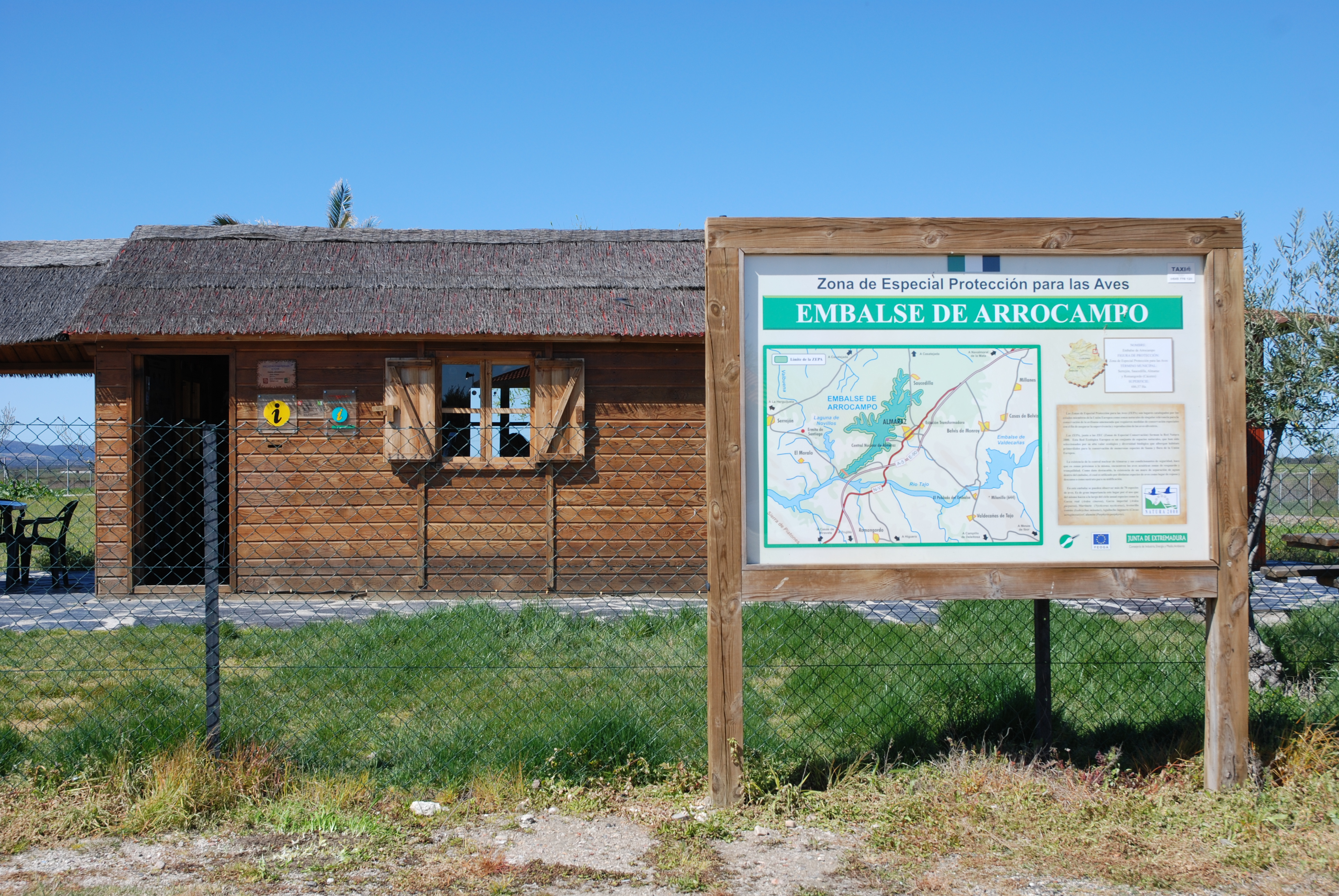
Information office of Arrocampo Reservoir Special Protection Area

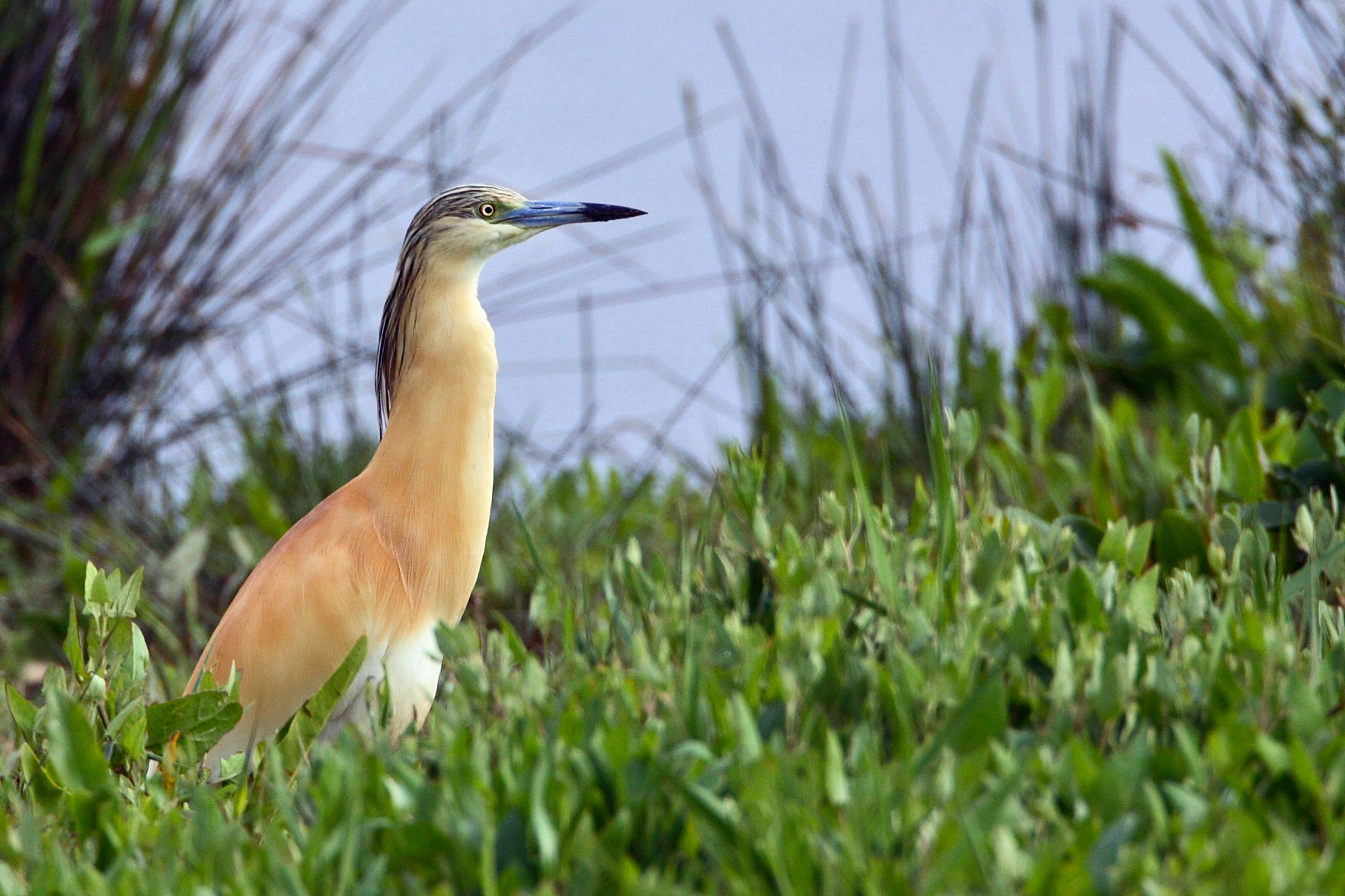
Squacco heron (Ardeola ralloides) can be watched at Arrocampo Reservoir

== Demography ==
- End of 15th century: Saucedilla had 900 inhabitants. There were a small community of Jews lived in Saucedilla before its expulsion of Spain in 1492.
- Between 1528 and 1653: the municipality lost many people (great demographic crisis in all regions of Spain)
- According to the Instituto Nacional de Estadística, the evolution between 1900 and 2010 is:
- 1960s: the emigration years. Many people (and their families) left the village at the beginning of the 1960s to earn their living in Madrid, Barcelona, Bilbao, France, Germany, etc.
- Foreign population, currently: community of Moroccan people. They work in regional or local agriculture (tobacco, harvests, fruits picking), domestic service, etc.

== History ==
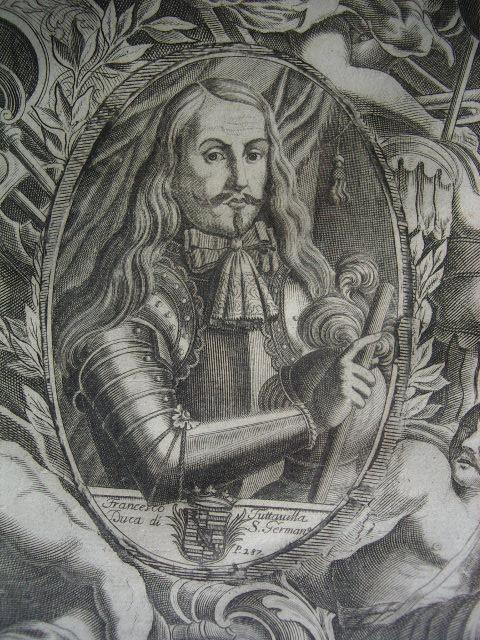
Francisco Tuttavilla, Duke of San Germán, Lord of Saucedilla (17th century)

- 14th century: foundation of the municipality. Colons of Collado de la Vera (see Collado (Cáceres)) (little village of the Comarca La Vera located in the foothills of the Sierra de Gredos mountain range) founded Saucedilla in middle of 14th century.
- 15th century: development of the municipality.
- 16th century: building of the church (gothic and renaissance styles) under Bishop Gutierre de Vargas Carvajal mandate. The church construction terminated under the bishopric of Pedro Ponce de León.
- 17th century:

- Lord of Saucedilla: Francisco Tuttavilla.
- Construction of the jurisdiction column (rollo jurisdiccional in Spanish).

- 18th century: Creation of Saucedilla County. The Counts of Saucedilla.
- The Independence War ("Guerra de Independencia")

== Monuments ==
- St John the Baptist Church (16th century). Gothic and Renaissance styles
- Jurisdiction Column (17th century)
- Plasencia Cross

=== Pictures of the monuments ===
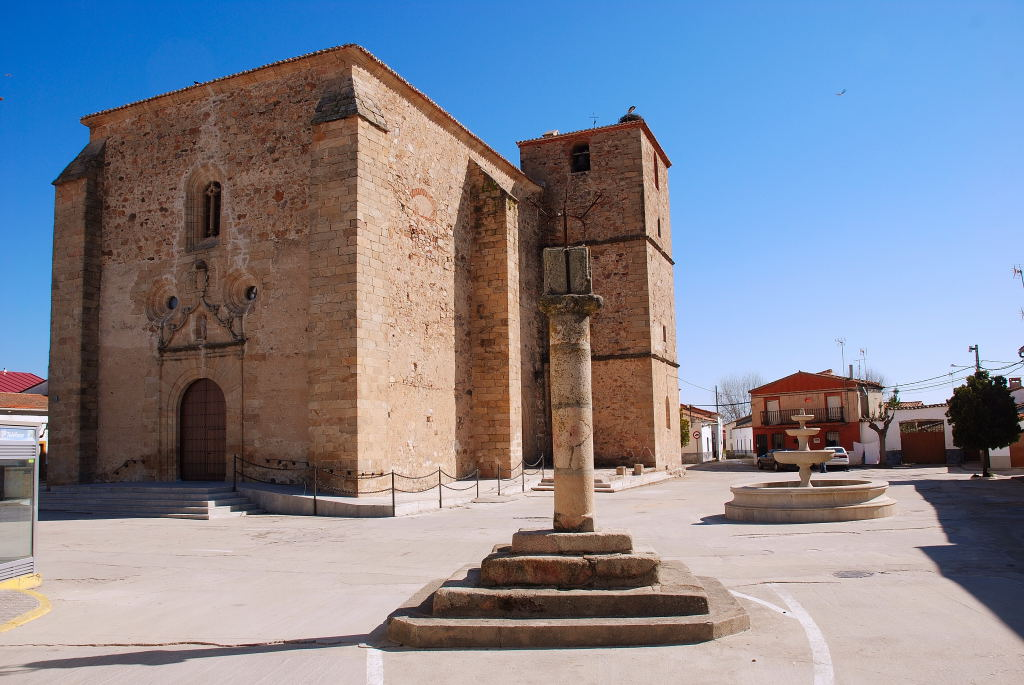
St John the Baptist church of Saucedilla

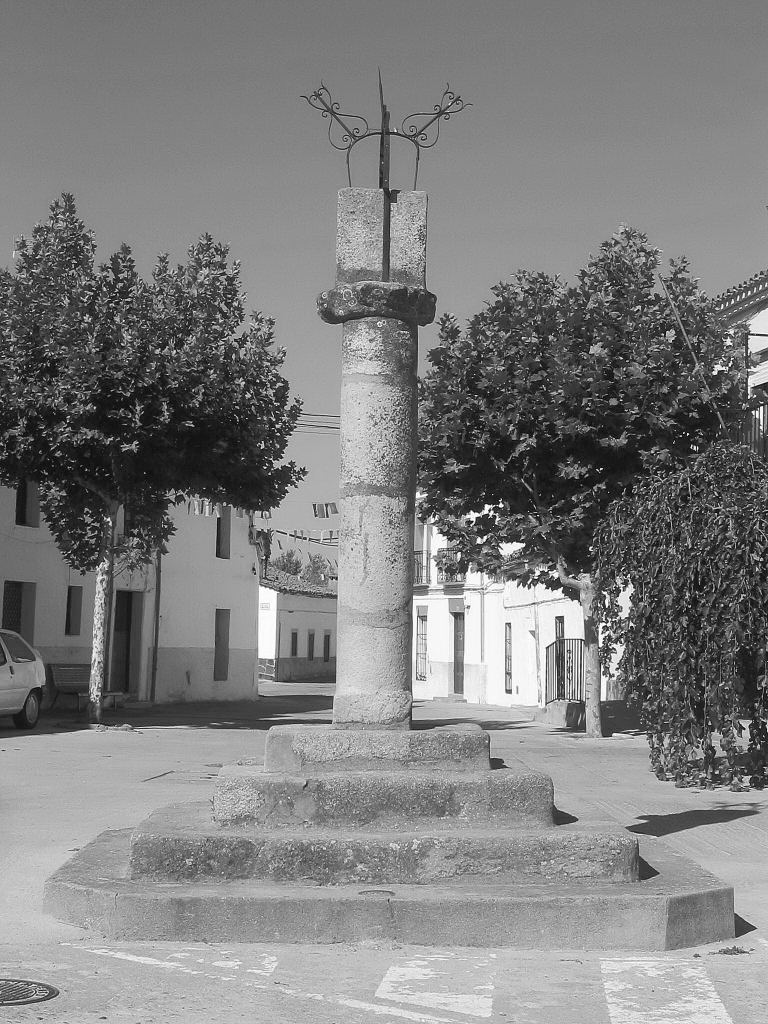
Jurisdiction column

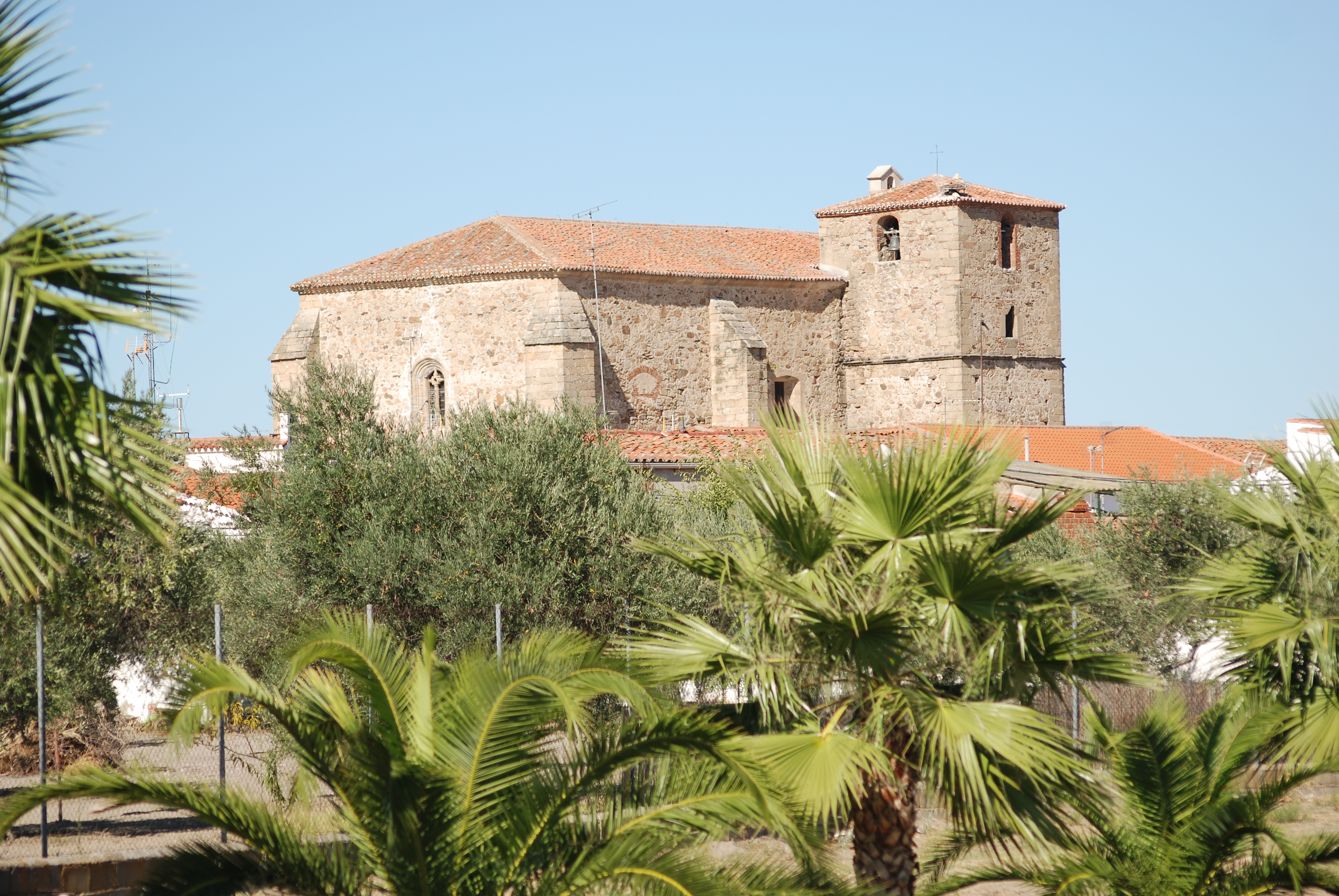
A view of the church

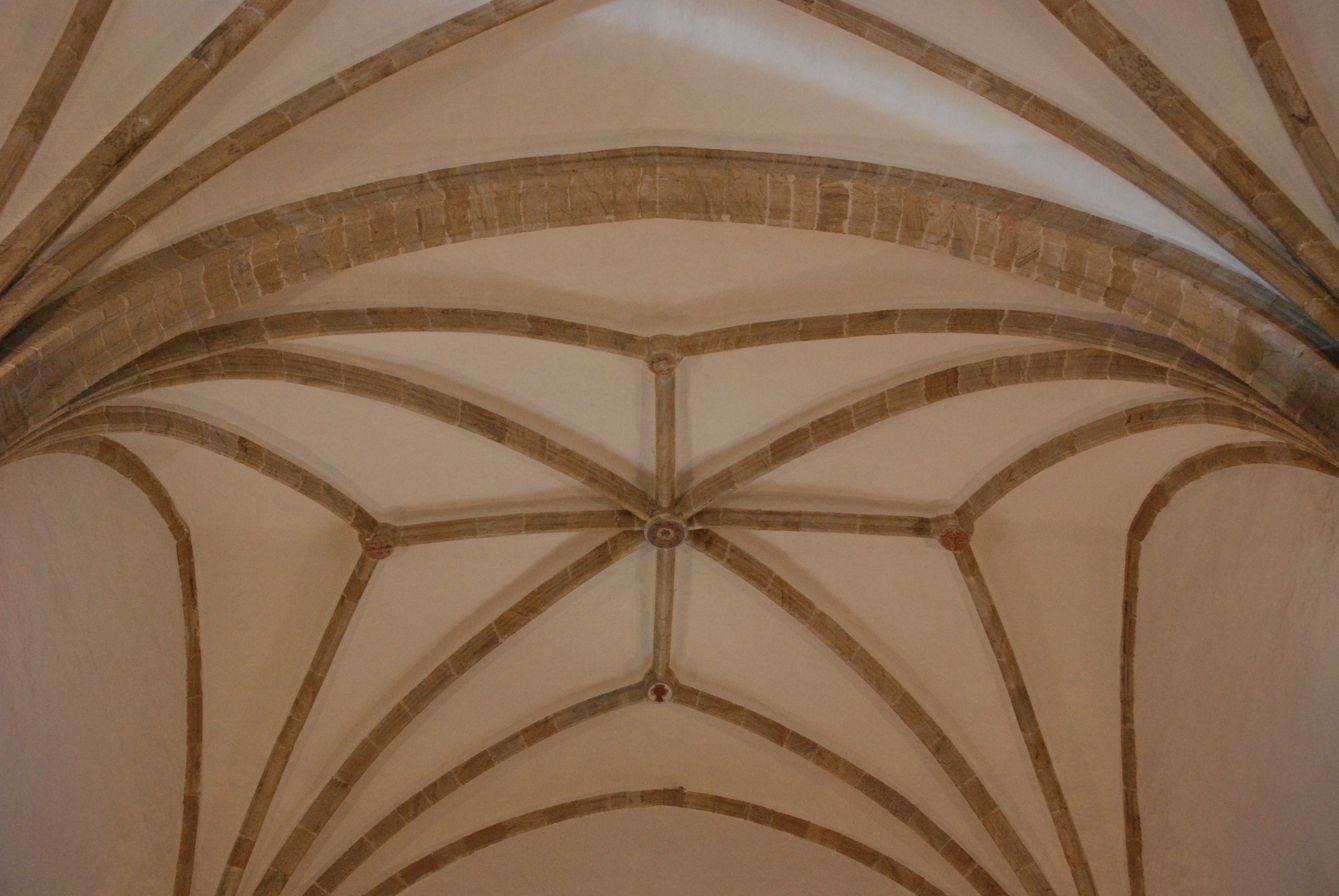
Gothic vault

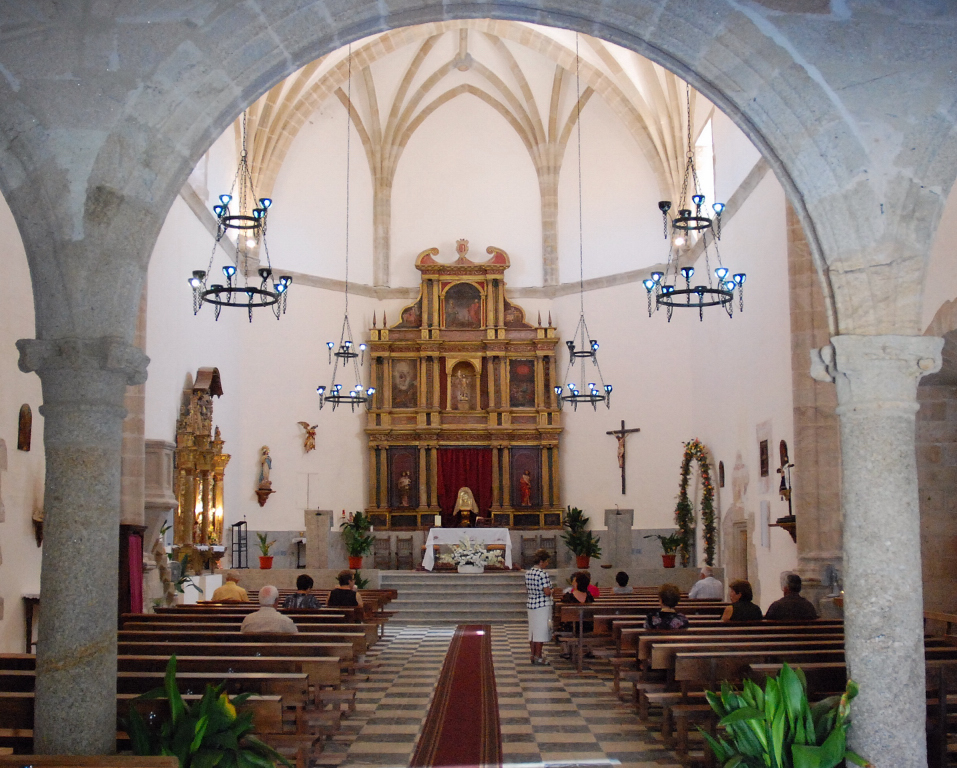
The nave from the choir

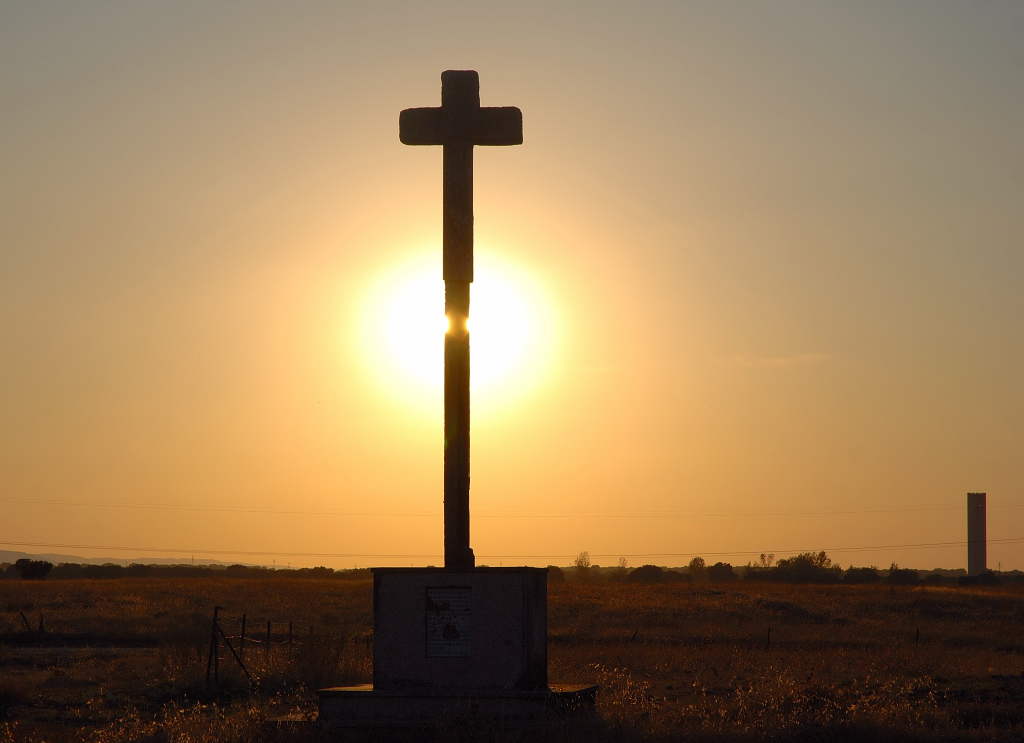
Plasencia Cross

== See also ==
- List of municipalities in Cáceres

== Bibliography ==
- Saucedilla: santo y seña de un pueblo extremeño, Juan Carlos RUBIO MASA & José Luis RUBIO MASA; Ed. Saucedilla, Excmo. Ayuntamiento de Saucedilla, 1994
- Saucedilla: costumbres, casas y familias, Ángel Marzal González; Navalmoral de la Mata, Ed. Publisher Navalmoral, 1999
