= La Higuera (disambiguation) =

La Higuera is a village in Bolivia, where Che Guevara was killed.

La Higuera may also refer to the following places:

- La Higuera, Catamarca, Argentina
- La Higuera, Chile
- Lahiguera, Jaén Province, Andalucía, Spain

== See also ==
- Las Higueras Airport, Río Cuarto, Córdoba Province, Argentina
- Higuera, Cáceres Province, Extremadura, Spain
