= Rafael Cerro (bullfighter) =

Spanish bullfighter (born 1993)

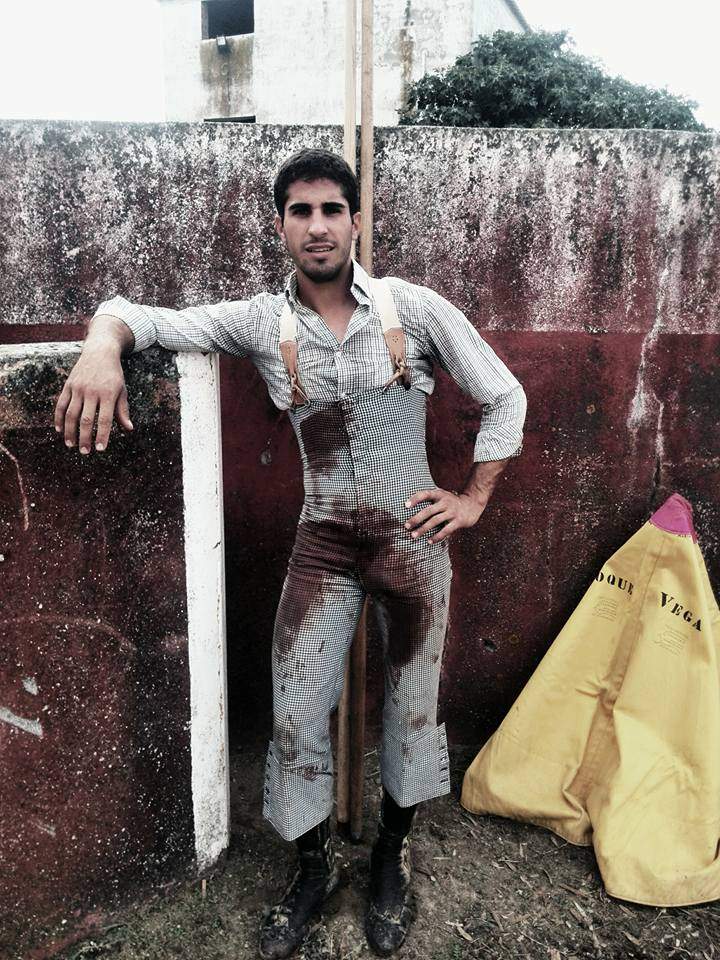
- Rafael Cerro in 2016

Personal information
- Nationality: Spanish
- Born: Rafael Cerro Ginés; 2 February 1993 (age 33) Navalmoral de la Mata
- Home town: Saucedilla
- Occupation: Bullfighter
- Years active: 2008–present
- Agent: José Ortega Cano (2010–2016); Luis Miguel Calvo (from 2016); Antonio Rubio (2016–2021) (apoderados)
- Relative: Rubén Elías Cerro (brother)

Rafael Cerro Ginés (Spanish: [rafaˈel ˈθero xiˈnes]; born 2 February 1993) is a Spanish bullfighter who is active in the world of tauromachy, albeit in a more managerial capacity nowadays.

== Early life ==
Born at the Hospital Campo Arañuelo in Navalmoral de la Mata but raised in neighbouring Saucedilla, Cerro is the youngest of seven siblings, having five sisters (one of whom is his twin) and one brother. Even when Cerro was quite young he was interested in bullfighting, as his father was passionate about it. This all arose from the family's rural background. Cerro himself has said "We are one hundred percent a country family". As a youth, he had to see to the family's goats before setting off to school each morning.

The wish to become a bullfighter, or as Cerro calls it, "the poison of wanting to be a bullfighter and to dedicate my life to this profession", came upon him once he reached the age of thirteen when his parents were working with fighting cattle on a farm called La Herguijuela de Doña Blanca. Furthermore, when his parents were at home, they always watched bullfighting, or some other tauromachy-themed programme, on television.

Even though there had never been a bullfighter in the Cerro family before, young Rafael's ambition led to his initiation into bullfighter's training at the Escuela taurina de Badajoz, a bullfighting school (he had begun his training at the Escuela Taurina de Plasencia, but this had closed after only about a year). Under this institution's tutelage, he could participate in various promotional competitions, in which he earned promising results.

Cerro gave himself over wholly to bullfighting, leaving little time for friends and family, nor much for his studies (outside bullfighter training). He stayed in school long enough to graduate, but never pursued tertiary education.

== Bullfighting career ==
=== As a novillero ===
Cerro appeared in public for the first time at a bullfighting event on 29 March 2008 in Puebla del Prior, Badajoz.

In the 2009 bullfighting season, on the afternoon of 13 October, novillero (novice bullfighter who fights yearling bulls) Cerro represented the Escuela Taurina de Badajoz in the bullfighting school final held at the Almendralejo (Badajoz) bullring, known as the Coso de Piedad (the "Piety Bullring"), and there he spared one bull calf, from the ranch run by Bernardino Píriz's heirs, in a process called an indulto, while also cutting two ears, which earned him a trip out through the bullring's main gate on his fellow bullfighters' shoulders, along with the Gaditanian David Galván.

In May of the 2010 bullfighting season, Cerro won the Oreja de Oro ("Golden Ear"), the prize awarded to the victor at the II World Meet of Bullfighting Schools, which was held at Aguascalientes in Mexico. That same month, he was a semifinalist at the I Máster Internacional de Escuelas Taurinas held at Nîmes, France, as well as winning first prize at the XVI Ciclo de Novilladas de las Escuelas Andaluzas — which was a capote de paseo (a kind of cape used as adornment rather than for bullfighting, typically worn for occasions such as paseíllos before the crowd at the bullring at the beginning of a bullfighting event). He won the "Promotion of New Bullfighting Talents" contest for novilleros without picadores at the Maestranza in Seville on 29 July after cutting two ears off a calf raised by Carlos Núñez in the final. Not long afterwards, in August, he would raise the trophy for the best bullfighter at the Bullfighting School Competition of Andalusia. As the season ended on 1 October, he came away with success, being borne shoulder-high from the Zafra bullring in Badajoz after fighting six young bulls from different ranches. Cerro was the first bullfighter ever to face six bulls in one corrida at Zafra.

In the 2011 bullfighting season, 24 novilladas (novice's bullfights) came Cerro's way, and he cut 31 ears and two tails. On 11 March, he made his début with picadores, cutting two ears at Olivenza, Badajoz on a bill shared with the Pacense El Fini and the Madrileño Fernando Adrián, and with young bulls supplied by Bernardino Píriz. Two months later, on 1 May, he cut one ear at La Monumental in Barcelona and four more at Jerez de los Caballeros, Badajoz on 8 May. Seven days later, he presented himself at the Real Maestranza in Seville, where he cut one ear. Late this same month, on 30 May, he appeared at Las Ventas in Madrid, sharing billing with the Mexican Diego Silveti and the Segovian Víctor Barrio, fighting young bulls from the El Ventorrillo ranch. On 19 July he cut one ear at the Plaza de Toros de Valencia. On 13 August, he got two ears in Dax, France, and five days later he fought bulls at the Real Maestranza in Seville. On 19 September he cut two ears in Navalcarnero, Madrid, following this with a further two ears in Algemesí, Valencia ten days later and two more in Guadarrama, Madrid on 2 October.

In the 2012 bullfighting season, Cerro saw 17 novilladas, reaping 19 ears and one tail along the way. He appeared on three afternoons in Seville and two in Madrid. On 14 July he cut two ears in Ávila, and that same month he earned two more in Roa, Burgos. Upon arriving back at the hotel, though, he collapsed and had to undergo emergency surgery for a broken arm. On 6 September, he cut one ear in Villaseca de la Sagra, Toledo, cutting a further two two days later in Pozuelo de Alarcón, Madrid. On 16 September he cut two ears in Los Navalmorales, Toledo.

The 2013 bullfighting season brought Cerro 23 novilladas in which he reaped 13 ears and one tail. On 7 April at Las Ventas he vied for the final of the prestigious Novillada Contest organized by Canal+, and met with success, but in the actual final, held on 28 June, likewise at Las Ventas, he got seriously gored once he had delivered the estocada (the sword thrust meant to kill the bull). He shared the billing at the final with fellow Extremaduran Tomás Campos and the Mexican Brandon Campos (no kin). On 26 May, he cut one ear at the Real Maestranza in Seville. On 23 June, he had to deliver the estocada to five bulls at Las Ventas in the mano a mano (a bullfighting event at which there are only two bullfighters on the bill rather than the usual three) with Sebastián Ritter, because Ritter had the misfortune of being gored by the first bull that he faced. On 5 July, Cerro fought in Pamplona and on 27 October in Lima, Peru.

=== As a matador ===
The 2014 bullfighting season marked Cerro's passage to the rank of matador de toros. From the maestro José Ortega Cano's hands, on 13 April, he took the alternativa at the bullring in his birthplace, Navalmoral de la Mata, Cáceres with bulls from the Alcurrucén ranch, cutting four ears and one tail. Standing as "godfather" at the ceremony was the Frenchman Sébastien Turzack Castella (known professionally as Sebastián Castella), while the witness was Miguel Ángel Perera from Badajoz. The bullfighter's most important triumph came on 19 June – the Feast of Corpus Christi – when he cut two ears at the Granada bullring, fighting together with José Tomás, who was appearing once again in Spain, and Finito de Córdoba. On this afternoon, though, he would not be borne shoulder-high through the main gate out of respect for his fellow bullfighter from Galapagar (Tomás), who had been wounded at this event. Cerro's alternativa was confirmed at Las Ventas on 15 August, with bulls from the Toros de El Torero ranch. Standing as "godfather" this time was the Madrileño César Jiménez, while Pepe Moral, from Seville, stood as witness. Cerro received ovation after ovation, but while he was fighting the afternoon's sixth bull, he was gored in the left thigh and ended up undergoing surgery in the bullring's own infirmary.

The 2015 bullfighting season found Cerro first at the Joseph-Fourniol bullring in Vic-Fezensac, France on 24 May. On 1 June came his first appearance at the Feria de San Isidro ("Saint Isidore's Fair" — a yearly event at the Las Ventas bullring in Madrid) together with the Salamancan Eduardo Gallo and the Colombian Sebastián Ritter with bulls bearing the Partido de Resina brand. On 10 August, he was awarded three ears in Miajadas, Cáceres, fighting a corrida with bulls supplied by the Adolfo Martín Andrés ranch.

In early 2016, Cerro put an end to his ties with José Ortega Cano; this was by mutual agreement. and henceforth it was to be the bullfighter Luis Miguel Calvo and the bull rancher Antonio Rubio, owner of the Peñajara de Casta Jijona ranch, who would be in charge of managing this new stage in Cerro's bullfighting career, as his apoderados (managers/agents). On 7 May, before his own people's eyes in Navalmoral de la Mata, the maestro cut seven ears from six bulls from different ranches. Three months later, Cerro would come back to the bullrings to solidify a great September. He would begin with three festivals: day 3 in Velada, Toledo, where he got both his bull's ears and his tail; five days later, in Castuera, Badajoz, where he left a Jandilla bull earless; and on day 10 in Oropesa, Toledo, he cut three ears from bulls from the Víctor Huertas ranch. The following Saturday, the maestro fought in the first corrida that was being organized in Segurilla, Toledo; it was a mano a mano with Salvador Cortés, from Seville, as the other bullfighter on the bill. Cerro cut one ear from a Peñajara bull. Two days later, he returned to a festival, in Casatejada, Cáceres, where a great afternoon culminated in a mano a mano with the Toledo bullfighter Eugenio de Mora, at which Cerro cut four ears and two tails from two magnificent young Alcurrucén bulls. He would end the season on 24 September in Talavera de la Reina, Toledo at the "La Otra" ("The Other") bullring together with the Madrileño Miguel Abellán and Sergio Blasco, facing some extraordinary bulls supplied by the Antonio Bañuelos ranch, from one of which Cerro cut one ear with a strong request for the other ear, and from another of which he cut a further ear after requesting an indulto. Putting the icing on the cake this season was Cerro's winning the prize for the 2016 season's best faena in Talavera de la Reina, Toledo at the I Joselito El Gallo City of Talavera Awards.

In the 2017 bullfighting season, Cerro fought bulls at two festivals, in Chillón, Ciudad Real, where he did a circuit of the bullring with the greatest trophies, and in Velada, Toledo, cutting two ears from a great bull from the Peñajara ranch.

Cerro began the 2018 bullfighting season in late July at the festival in Nombela, Toledo with a mano a mano with Miguel Abellán; he cut three ears from young bulls from the El Freixo ranch. He was announced at Mombeltrán, Ávila in mid-August, and there he cut the tail off a magnificent young bull from the La Guadamilla ranch. He then had to wait almost two years before he was once again announced at a bullfight. That was in Méntrida, Toledo, where he was left listening to silence from the stands as he fought his two bulls.

Cerro began the 2019 bullfighting season with a declaration of intentions in El Tiemblo, Ávila, where he was borne out shoulder-high after cutting three ears from two notable bulls from the Peñajara ranch. On 15 August he fought bulls at the Cenicientos, Madrid, Bull Fair together with Alberto Lamelas and Javier Jiménez, and with bulls supplied by the Dolores Aguirre ranch. On 21 September, he fought two bulls in Talavera de la Reina, Toledo together with Eugenio de Mora and Morenito de Aranda.

On 3 February 2021, it was announced that Cerro had broken with his apoderado Antonio Rubio.

=== As a bullfight director ===
By 2023, Cerro's participation in bullfighting had taken on a more managerial character. He works as a bullfight director for many events in Extremadura, but he also has a day job working for a company whose job is to clear and close farms. He says of this newest stage in his career:

I fight [bulls] a lot less than I would like, and that is hard. The worst situation is not gorings, which are "battle scars" and the consequence of standing before a bull. The worst thing is, as is commonly said, "being on the bench" and not fighting. As I am a serious person, and, although I do not usually have quirks, I have a lot of character and I go straight on. I know that I have not fought in bullfights or have stopped being advertised because there are things that I won't go through and I claim what is due me. As I said before, I have learnt some values for life that are sacred and I do not mean to change them.

Cerro sees his new role in bullfighting as the most important one because he has more responsibilities and he is the one who must keep an eye on everything and everybody at a bullfighting event. He evidently has a hands-on approach, even seeking to avoid tragic outcomes whenever there is a mishap with a bull at one of his corridas. He has physically intervened at times in the bullring when there have been life-threatening situations during a bullfight. Cerro tries to remove the bull as quickly as he can, sometimes even risking his own life to keep the bull off the stricken bullfighter, earning him the epithet "the lifesaver".

On one occasion in Coria, Cáceres in June 2024, Cerro saved a man at the Sanjuanes festival. Although not as internationally famous as the one in Pamplona, this festival, too, features loose bulls in the streets, and in this particular instance, one bull, named Segurón, from the José Escolar ranch, mauled a runner in a narrow street. Cerro, who was the event director, happened to be right nearby and came running, bullfighting cape (capote de brega) at the ready, and distracted Segurón and got him off the runner, whom Segurón had already seriously gored three times. The runner was taken to hospital for treatment and recovery after Cerro had led Segurón to keep on in his original direction, which now took him away from his victim. Video was taken of the incident and was uploaded to social media.

== Family ==
Cerro's family still lives in rural Saucedilla. His brother Rubén Elías Cerro is a picador.
