= Valdeverdeja =

- Municipality
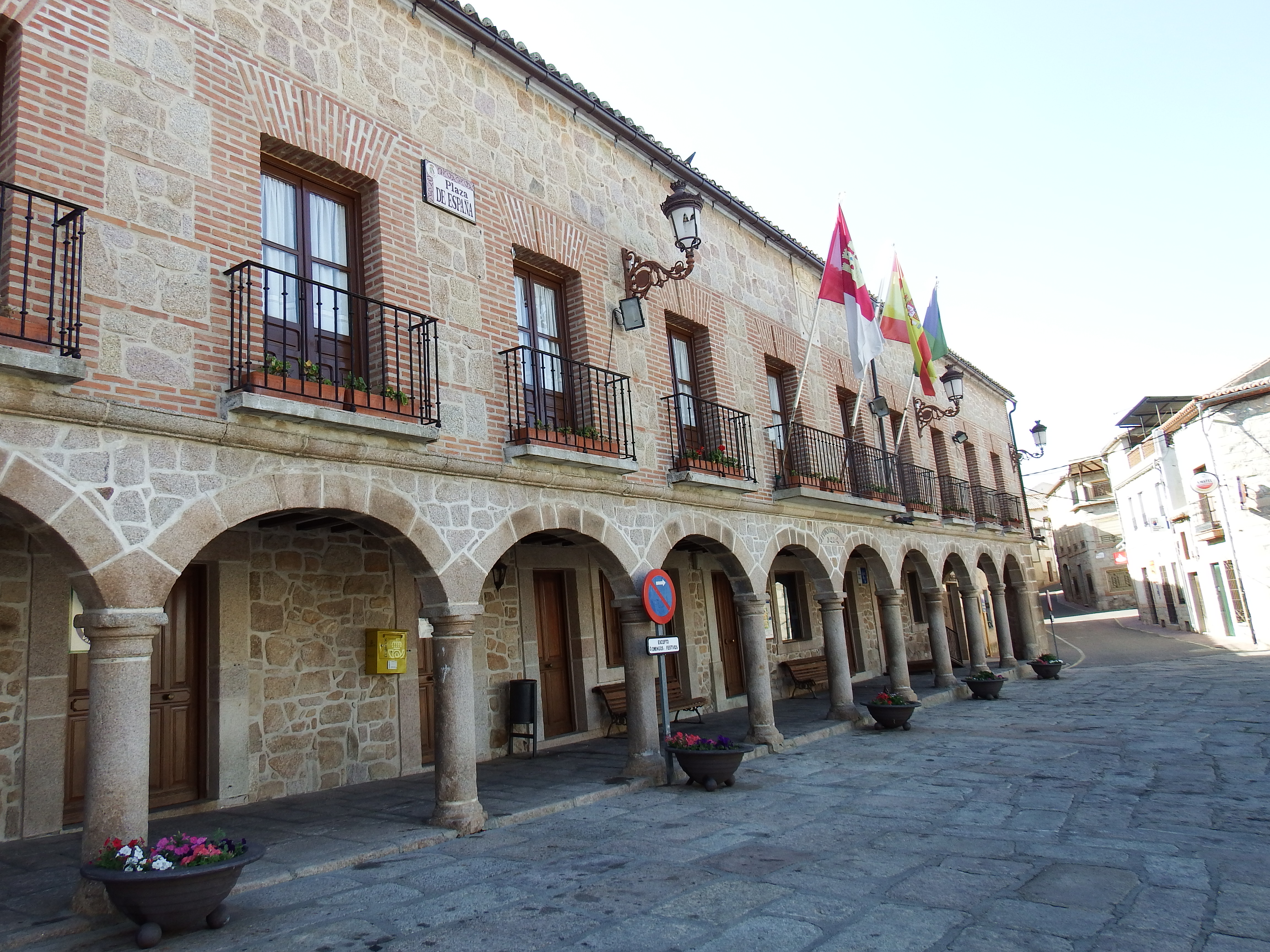
- Town hall

- Flag Coat of arms

- Location in Spain
- Coordinates: 39°48′N 5°14′W
- Country: Spain
- Autonomous community: Castile-La Mancha
- Province: Toledo

Area
  - Total: 67 km^{2} (26 sq mi)
- Elevation: 397 m (1,302 ft)

Population (2025-01-01)
  - Total: 598
  - Density: 8.9/km^{2} (23/sq mi)
- Time zone: UTC+1 (CET)
  - Summer (DST): UTC+2 (CEST)

Valdeverdeja is a municipality located in the province of Toledo, Castile-La Mancha, Spain. It belongs to the Campana de Oropesa region and has 647 inhabitants according to the 2006 census (INE). The municipal area is 67 km², and it has a population density of 10.04 inhabitants per km².

Valdeverdeja is located at the western end of the province of Toledo, and at the same time on the border of the autonomous community of Castilla-La Mancha, adjacent to the province of Cáceres, already belonging to Extremadura. It is semi-circled by the Tagus River, which is the geographical feature that forms the border between the two communities and is 3 km away from the urban nucleus, it is located near La Jara occupying the valley.

The coat of arms of the town of Valdeverdeja is divided into three quarters, the first of them in a gold tower on a green field, the second on a white field with gold chains crossed by a black strip and in the third, in a field of gules a white castle.

== Communications ==
Close to the Extremadura highway, the A-5 is connected to it by the TO-7121 road that reaches Oropesa, head of the region and by the MC-4159 to the town of El Puente del Arzobispo where it joins the MC -4100. By the TO-7137 it joins Berrocalejo.

== Geography ==
Settled in the valley of the Tagus on a granite terrain that forms the so-called canchales.

The Tagus runs boxed in with steep banks. In its margins there are, already in disuse, several water mills.

The vegetation, composed of meadows populated with holm oaks and olive trees and scrubland with broom and thyme, is typically Mediterranean.

=== Fauna ===
In the past, the climate and the vegetation largely determine the fauna: rabbits, rats, mice, partridges, wild boars (especially in recent years), foxes, wildcats, owls, eagle owls, vultures, swallows, storks, storks black, various kinds of eagles, crows and different species of birds (goldfinches) and fish (barbels, carps, pike, eels now practically disappeared), etc. Some species are rarely found anymore; others, however, on the brink of extinction, are recovering, such as vultures and certain eagles.

=== Flora ===
The flora is typical of the Mediterranean region. Wild species include holm oak, broom, thyme, lavender, poplars, and wild olive trees. Due to the agricultural activity in the region, it is common to find olive and fig groves that have become part of the natural landscape.

== Economy ==
The economy of the municipality is based on the primary sector, on agriculture and livestock since its foundation. Industrial activity is almost non-existent and the service sector is developing with the incipient rural tourism.

- Primary sector, the historical base of the municipal economy. Agriculture with fields of olive trees and cereals that opens to irrigation taking advantage of the waters of the Tagus. There is livestock that accompanies agricultural activity.
- Secondary sector, practically non-existent, has been based on the mechanization of some activities related to agriculture, such as milling, in which hydraulic power has been used. In the middle of the 20th century, an old mill was converted into an electricity generating plant, what they call the factory of light . This activity has not been developed throughout history.
- Service sector, commerce and services are oriented to meet the needs of residents and even so these have to be covered, to a large extent in Oropesa or Talavera. Tourist activity, encouraged as a result of the rural tourism boom, is developing progressively, thanks to which there are hotel establishments.

== Monuments and places of interest ==
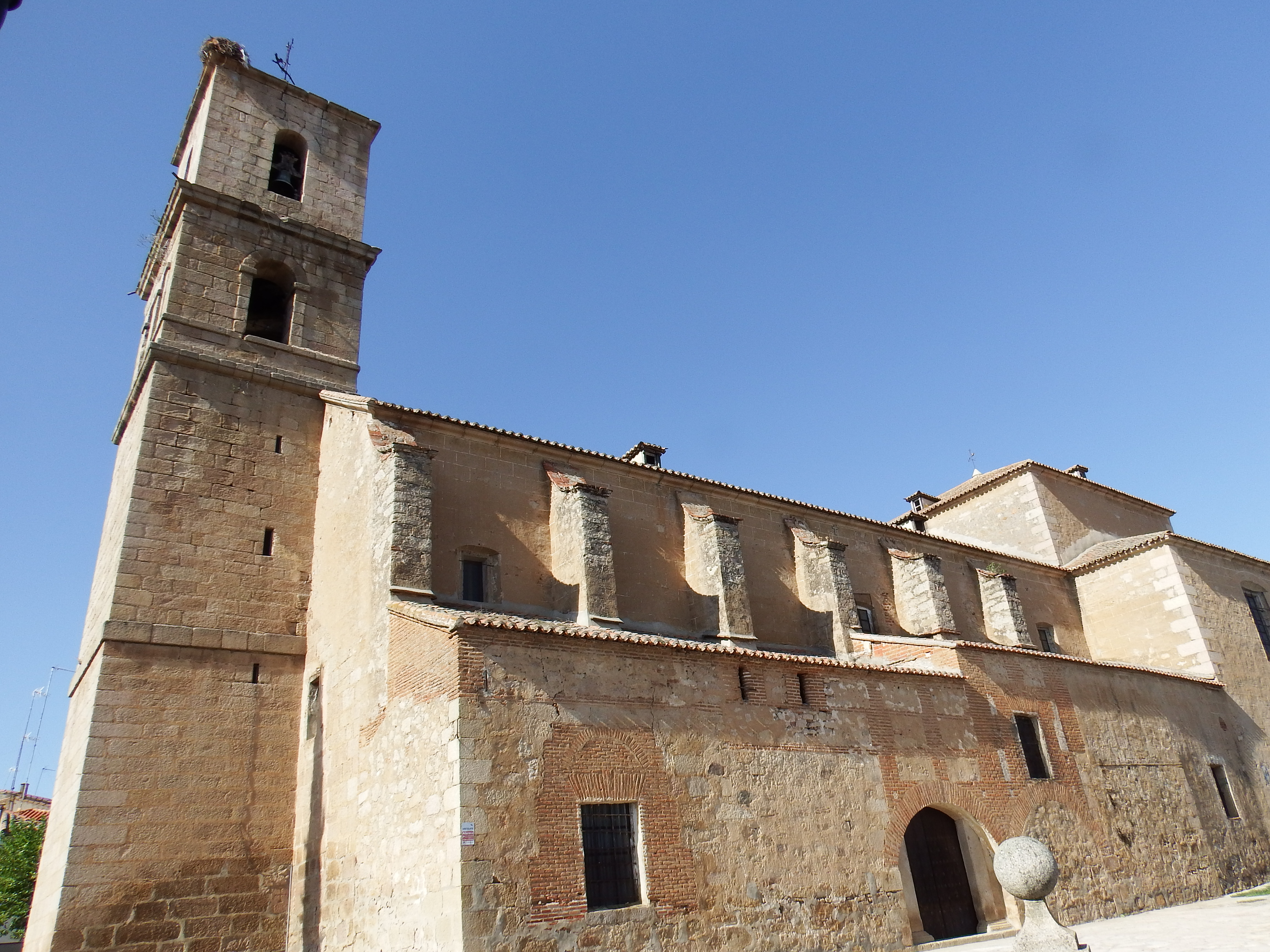
Iglesia de San Blás

- The Church of San Blas, from the 16th century and enlarged in the 18th century. With the layout in the shape of a cross, it stands out for the height of its vaults and cupola.
- The town hall, a large granite building with arcades supported by Tuscan columns.
- Hermitage of Nuestra Señora de los Desamparados, from the 18th century, over a previous one from the 12th century. It has a relevant ordeal.
- Pozos Nuevos ("new wells"), a place where several dozen wells are located with their corresponding sinks made of stone in a single piece. It has been declared an Asset of Cultural Interest, with the category of Historic Site.
- Casa Curato, is the rectory of Valdeverdeja. It has a beautiful façade that overlooks the Plaza Mayor in which there is a relevant iron fence. The main access is through San Blas street where a gate opens in the middle that gives access to the patio.
- Arch House, built 1876. Declared architectural heritage and asset of cultural interest (BIC) of this Villa on June 17, 1992 . A semicircular arch with access to two streets, gives way from one to the other, under a barrel vault, several brick discharge arches, superimposed with the rest of the masonry.
