= Rafael Cerro =

Rafael Cerro may refer to:

- Rafael Cerro (weightlifter)
- Rafael Cerro (bullfighter)
