= Tiétar, Cáceres =

Tiétar
- Flag Coat of arms
- Interactive map of Tiétar
- Coordinates: 40°01′46″N 5°29′0″W
- Country: Spain
- Autonomous community: Extremadura
- Province: Cáceres
- Comarca: Campo Arañuelo

Area
  - Total: 2,391 km^{2} (923 sq mi)
- Elevation: 277 m (909 ft)

Population (2025-01-01)
  - Total: 835
  - Density: 0.349/km^{2} (0.904/sq mi)
- Time zone: UTC+1 (CET)
  - Summer (DST): UTC+2 (CEST)

Tiétar is a municipality located in the province of Cáceres, Extremadura, Spain. According to the 2013 census (INE), the municipality has a population of 948 inhabitants. Tiétar broke away of Talayuela on 1 July 2011.
