= Talayuela =

- Municipality
- Flag Coat of arms

- Location in Spain
- Coordinates: 39°59′10″N 5°36′35″W
- Country: Spain
- Autonomous Community: Extremadura
- Province: Cáceres
- Comarca: Campo Arañuelo

Government
  - Mayor: MARIA RODRIGUEZ (YOGUI)

Area
  - Total: 204.7 km^{2} (79.0 sq mi)
- Elevation (AMSL): 287 m (942 ft)

Population (2025-01-01)
  - Total: 7,439
  - Density: 36.34/km^{2} (94.12/sq mi)
- Time zone: UTC+1 (CET)
  - Summer (DST): UTC+2 (CEST (GMT +2))
- Postal code: 10310
- Area code: +34 (Spain) + 927 (Cáceres)
- Website: talayuela.es

Talayuela (Spanish: [talaˈʝwela]) is a municipality located in the province of Cáceres, Extremadura, (Spain). Talayuela's name comes from "atalayuela", related to the Spanish (Arab origin) word "Atalaya", which means "watch tower".

== Geography ==
Talayuela is located in the north-east part of Extremadura autonomous community, in Tiétar river valley, an important tributary of Tagus river, and belongs to Campo Arañuelo comarca, next to La Vera comarca. That land is almost a flat valley, with an altitude of 287 meters above sea level.

Talayuela has a large and fertile pine forest, plus a big number of oak forests turned into meadows for human use. Talayuela also has a number of important ponds, which are used by local animals and migrant birds as a refuge and provisioning base.

== Demographics ==
Current Talayuela's population are 9,582 people (INE 2007), including people living in neighboring farms. The population has been growing due to immigrants looking for a better job, so nowadays Talayuela holds people from 22 countries. Immigrants are 33% of current Talayuela's population.

== Economy ==
Talayuela's economy is mainly based on tobacco growing, but in the last years it started to decline as the European Union grants disappeared. Other important growings for Talayuela are asparagus, which provides job for many families as there are two important nearby canning companies, pepper, tomato and corn. As tobacco growing is declining, other alternatives are being developed, like saffron, cotton or coffee growing. Actually, both cotton and coffee were grown before tobacco growings began.

Families based in Talayuela, many of them immigrants, live thanks to agriculture. People in Talayuela use to alternate tobacco and asparagus harvest in different parts of the year, so they're rarely unemployed, and some immigrants work on grape and orange harvest in other autonomous communities too.

Tobacco growing is so important in Talayuela that it helped many young people to pay for their education, working in summer time and studying in winter time.

== History ==
Talayuela was founded in the 16th century as an extension of Plasencia town, it was the same century in which the San Martín church was built, being the most important Talayuela's monument.

== See also ==
- Navalmoral de la Mata
- Plasencia
- Campo Arañuelo
- List of municipalities in Cáceres
