= La Higuera, Catamarca =

Coordinates: 27°56′28″S 65°41′49″W

La Higuera (Catamarca)
- Municipality and village
- Interactive map of La Higuera (Catamarca)
- Country: Argentina
- Province: Catamarca Province
- Time zone: UTC−3 (ART)

La Higuera (Catamarca) is a village and municipality in Catamarca Province in northwestern Argentina.
