= Millanes =

Coordinates: 39°51′N 5°35′W

Millanes, Spain
- municipality
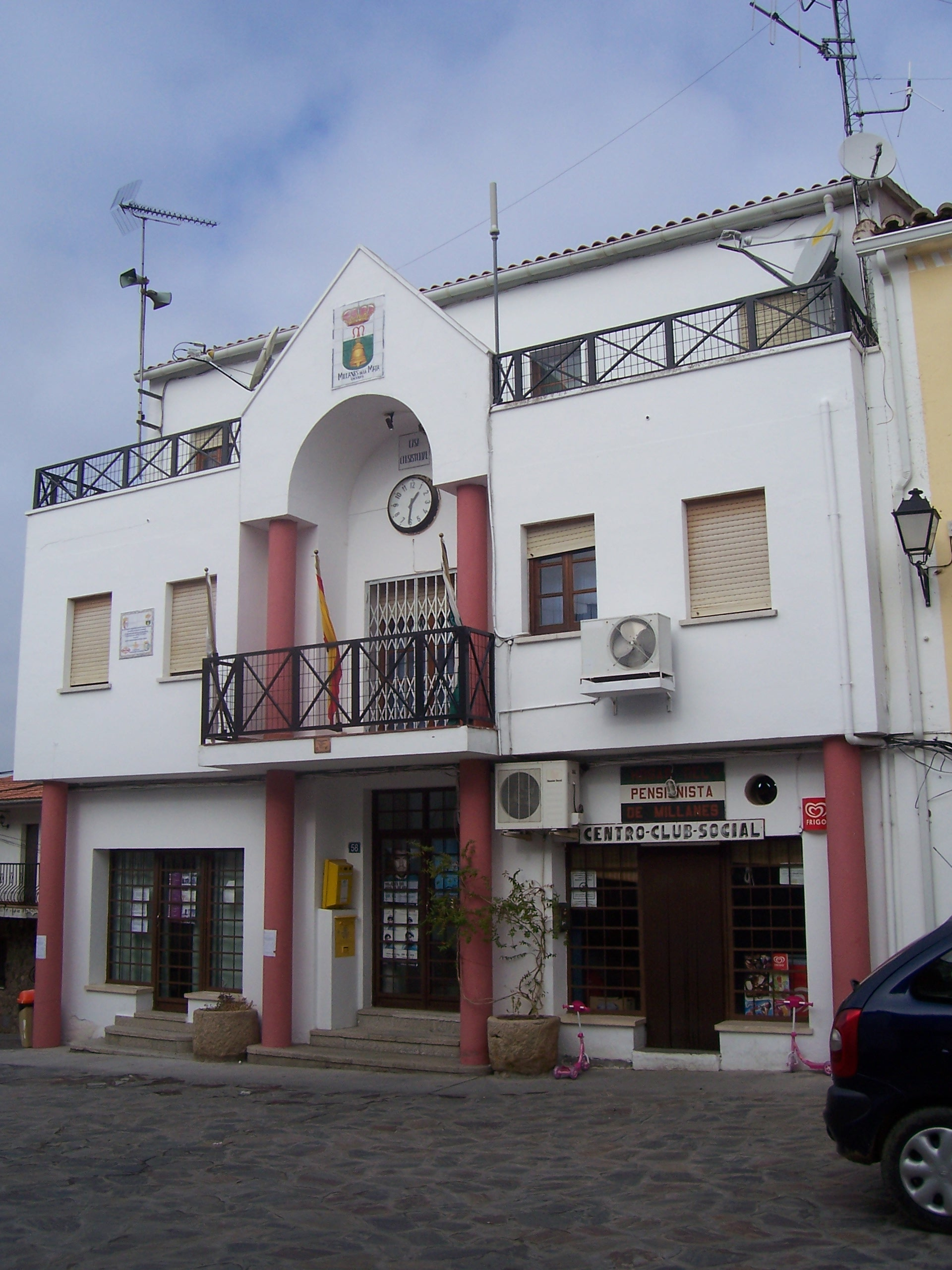

- Coat of arms
- Interactive map of Millanes, Spain
- Country: Spain
- Autonomous community: Extremadura
- Province: Cáceres
- Municipality: Millanes

Area
  - Total: 17 km^{2} (6.6 sq mi)

Population (2025-01-01)
  - Total: 239
  - Density: 14/km^{2} (36/sq mi)
- Time zone: UTC+1 (CET)
  - Summer (DST): UTC+2 (CEST)

Millanes is a municipality located in the province of Cáceres, Extremadura, Spain. According to the 2006 census (INE), the municipality has a population of 246 inhabitants.

== See also ==
- List of municipalities in Cáceres
