= El Gordo, Cáceres =

Coordinates: 39°52′N 5°20′W

- Flag Coat of arms

- Location in Spain.
- Country: Spain
- Autonomous community: Cáceres

Area
  - Total: 78.72 km^{2} (30.39 sq mi)
- Elevation: 321 m (1,053 ft)

Population (2025-01-01)
  - Total: 363
  - Density: 4.61/km^{2} (11.9/sq mi)
- Time zone: UTC+1 (CET)
  - Summer (DST): UTC+2 (CEST)

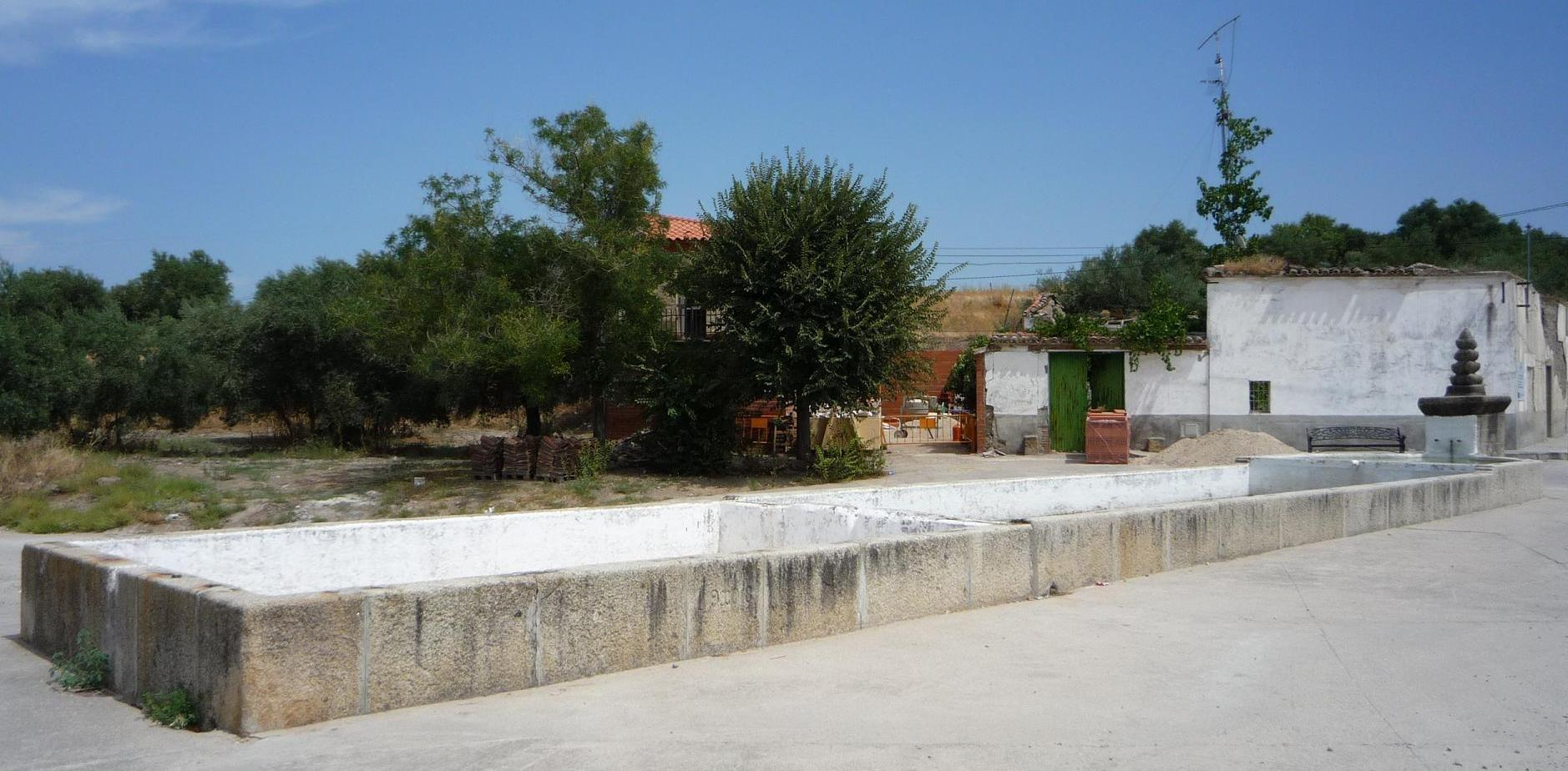
El Gordo abrevadero

El Gordo is a municipality in the province of Cáceres and autonomous community of Extremadura, Spain. The municipality covers an area of 78.72 square kilometres (30.39 sq mi) and as of 2011 had a population of 385 people.

== See also ==
- List of municipalities in Cáceres
