= Valdecañas de Tajo =

- municipality
- Flag Coat of arms

- Location within Extremadura Location within Spain
- Coordinates: 39°45′N 5°37′W
- Country: Spain
- Autonomous community: Extremadura
- Province: Cáceres
- Municipality: Valdecañas de Tajo

Area
  - Total: 18 km^{2} (6.9 sq mi)

Population (2025-01-01)
  - Total: 96
  - Density: 5.3/km^{2} (14/sq mi)
- Time zone: UTC+1 (CET)
  - Summer (DST): UTC+2 (CEST)

Valdecañas de Tajo is a municipality located in the province of Cáceres, Extremadura, Spain. According to the 2006 census (INE), the municipality has a population of 168 inhabitants.

== See also ==
- List of municipalities in Cáceres
