= Almaraz =

- Municipality
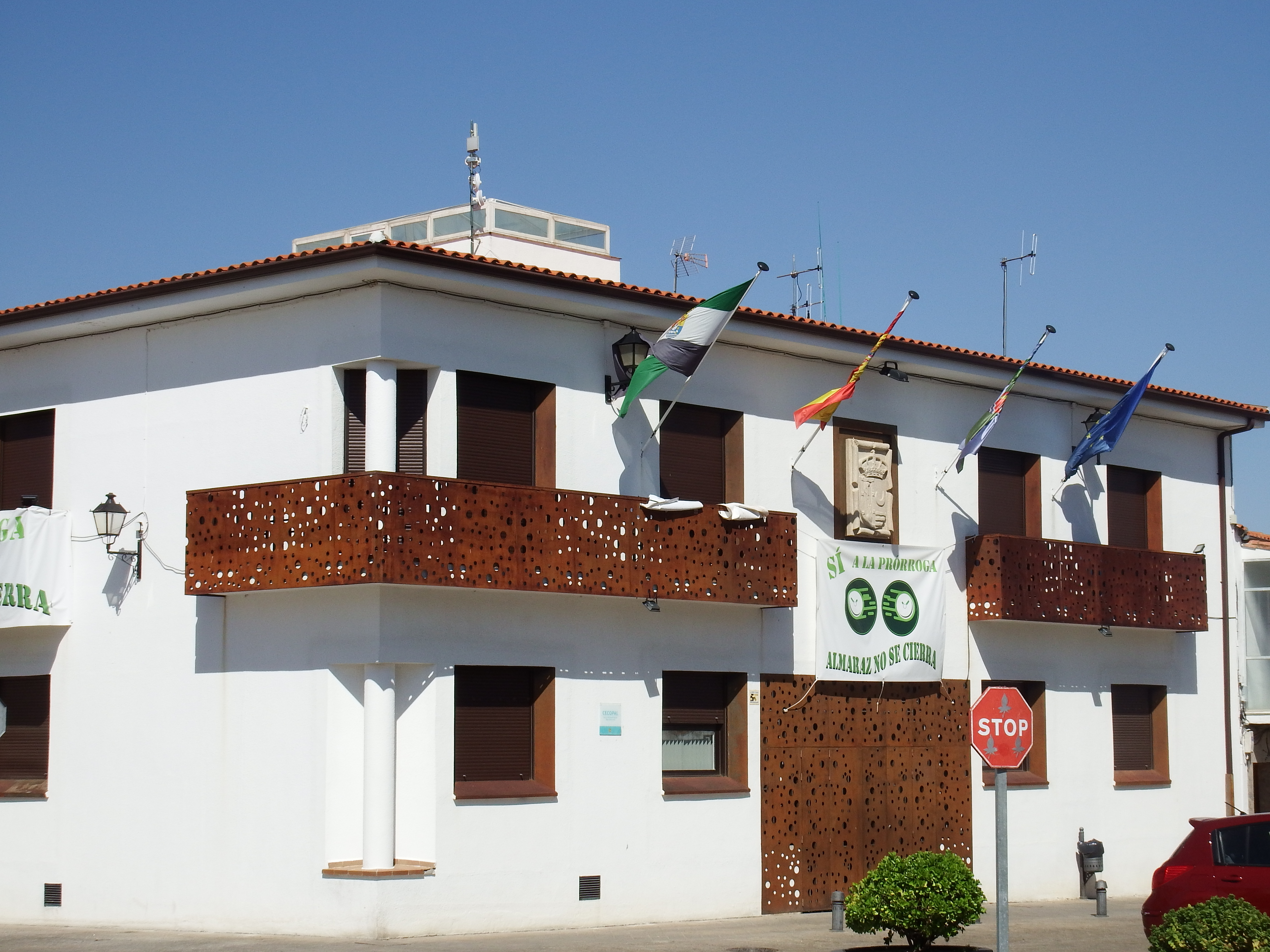
- Town hall

- Coat of arms

- Location in Spain
- Coordinates: 39°48′N 5°40′W
- Country: Spain
- Autonomous community: Extremadura
- Province: Cáceres
- Comarca: Campo Arañuelo

Government
  - Alcaldesa: María Sabina Hernández Fernández (2007) (PP-EU)

Area
  - Total: 34 km^{2} (13 sq mi)
- Elevation: 277 m (909 ft)

Population (2025-01-01)
  - Total: 1,594
  - Density: 47/km^{2} (120/sq mi)
- Demonym: almaraceño/a
- Time zone: UTC+1 (CET)
  - Summer (DST): UTC+2 (CEST)
- Postal code: 10350
- Website: Official website

Almaraz is a town in Cáceres Province, Extremadura, Spain. As of 2005, its population is 1,295. It is on the European route E90. It is the home of the Almaraz Nuclear Power Plant. A large solar power plant is being built in the town.

The bridge over the Tagus at Almaraz was built by Emperor Carlos I in the 16th Century and was known by the local people as the Albalat Bridge; however, it was destroyed by the Spanish on 14 March 1809 to prevent its use by the French during the Peninsular War. In the Battle of Almaraz on 18/19 May 1812, the Anglo-Portuguese Army under Lord Hill destroyed a French pontoon bridge across the Tagus which was protected by two French garrisons at either end.

Later, the old bridge at Almaraz has been repaired and can now be driven across.

== See also ==
- List of municipalities in Cáceres
