= Toril, Cáceres =

Coordinates: 39°53′50″N 5°46′44″W

Toril
- Flag Coat of arms

- Location in Spain.
- Country: Spain
- Autonomous community: Cáceres

Area
  - Total: 149.76 km^{2} (57.82 sq mi)
- Elevation: 264 m (866 ft)

Population (2025-01-01)
  - Total: 157
  - Density: 1.05/km^{2} (2.72/sq mi)
- Time zone: UTC+1 (CET)
  - Summer (DST): UTC+2 (CEST)
- Website: www.toril.es

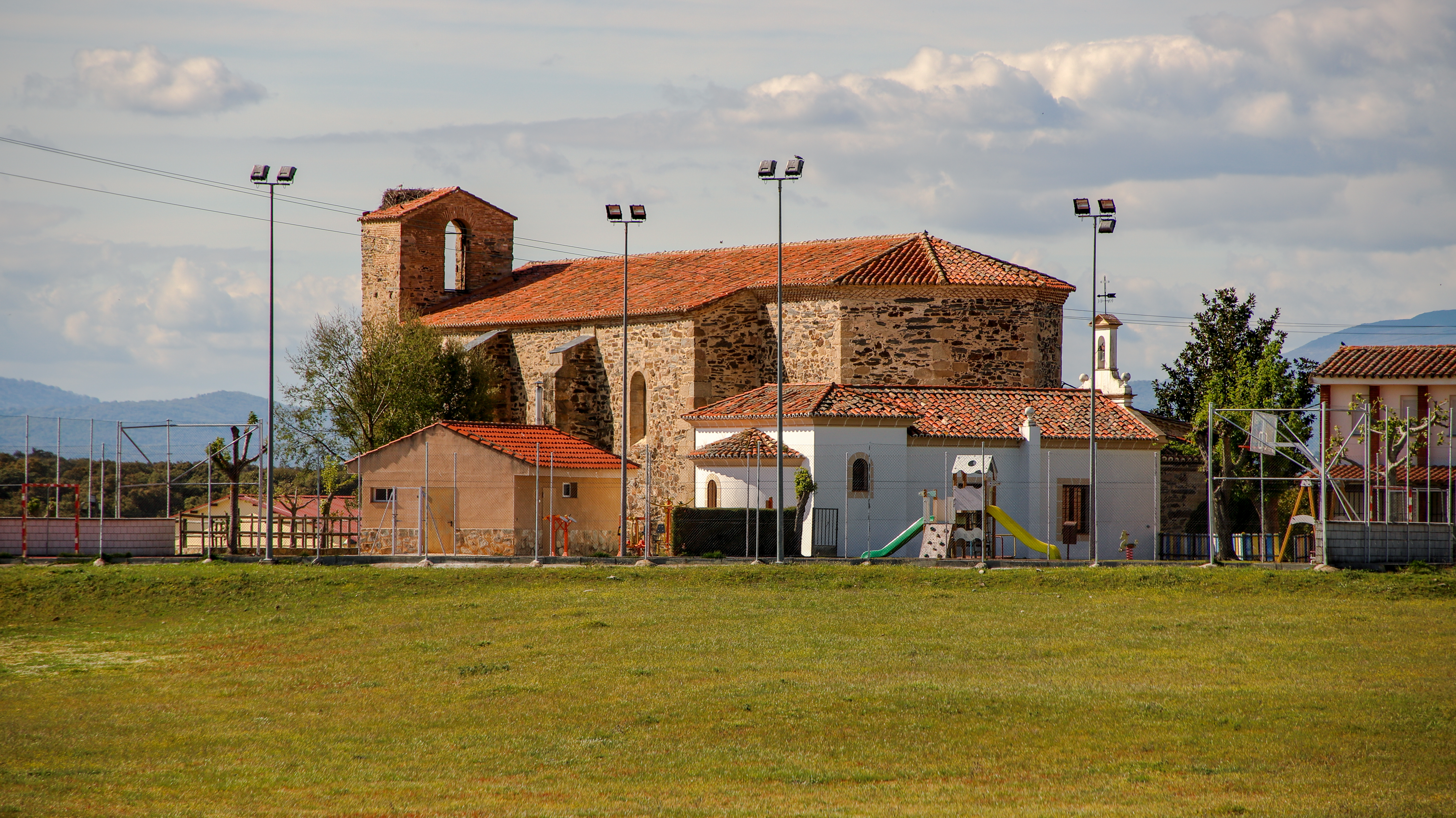
View of Toril

Toril is a municipality in the province of Cáceres and autonomous community of Extremadura, Spain. The municipality covers an area of 149.76 square kilometres (57.82 sq mi) and as of 2014 had a population of 176 people.

== See also ==
- List of municipalities in Cáceres
