= Serrejón =

Coordinates: 39°49′N 5°48′W

Serrejón, Spain
- municipality
- Flag Coat of arms
- Interactive map of Serrejón, Spain
- Country: Spain
- Autonomous community: Extremadura
- Province: Cáceres
- Municipality: Serrejón

Area
  - Total: 124 km^{2} (48 sq mi)

Population (2025-01-01)
  - Total: 410
  - Density: 3.3/km^{2} (8.6/sq mi)
- Time zone: UTC+1 (CET)
  - Summer (DST): UTC+2 (CEST)

Serrejón is a municipality located in the province of Cáceres, Extremadura, Spain. According to the 2006 census (INE), the municipality has a population of 490 inhabitants.

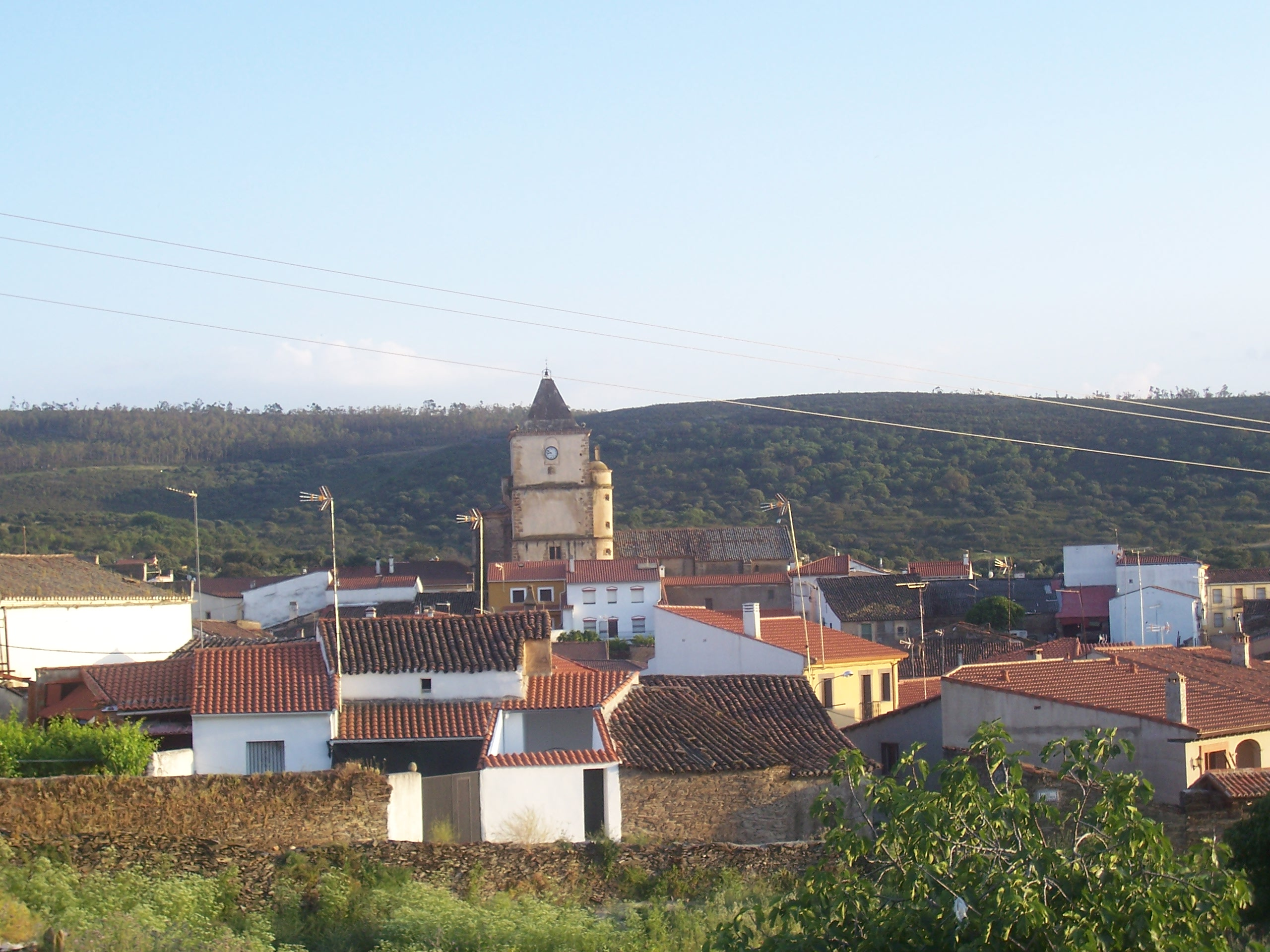
View of Serrejón from the hermitage of San Antonio

== See also ==
- List of municipalities in Cáceres
