= Romangordo =

Coordinates: 39°45′N 5°42′W

Romangordo, Spain
- municipality
- Coat of arms
- Interactive map of Romangordo, Spain
- Country: Spain
- Autonomous community: Extremadura
- Province: Cáceres
- Municipality: Romangordo

Area
  - Total: 39 km^{2} (15 sq mi)

Population (2025-01-01)
  - Total: 240
  - Density: 6.2/km^{2} (16/sq mi)
- Time zone: UTC+1 (CET)
  - Summer (DST): UTC+2 (CEST)

Romangordo is a municipality located in the province of Cáceres, Extremadura, Spain. According to the 2008 census (INE), the municipality has a population of 206 inhabitants.

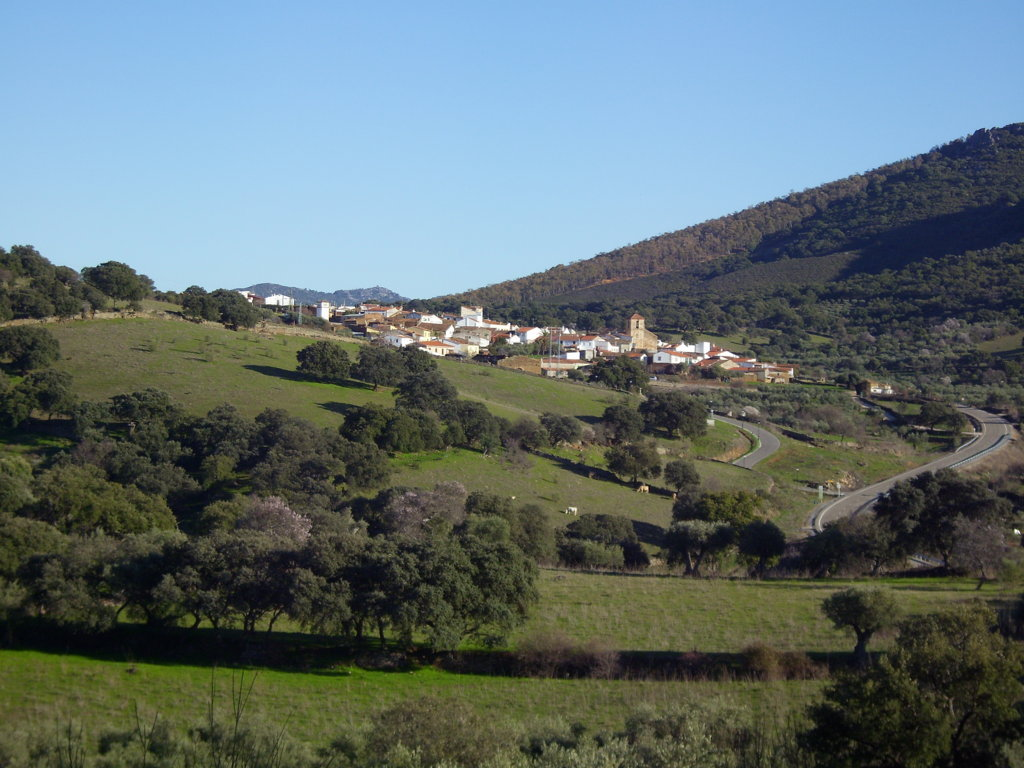
View of Romangordo

== See also ==
- List of municipalities in Cáceres
