= Berrocalejo =

Berrocalejo, Spain
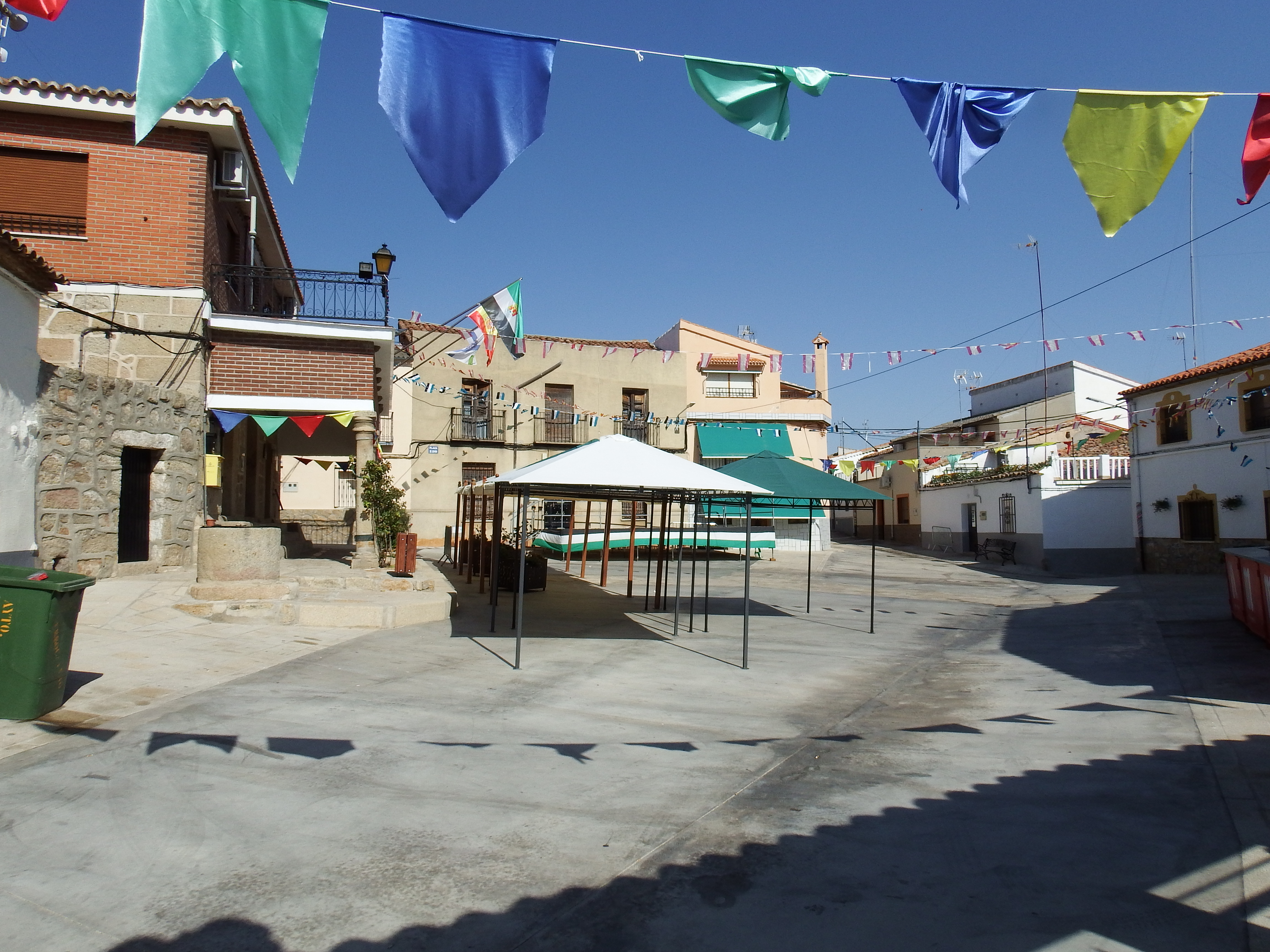
- Berrocalejo - Town hall at front

- Flag Coat of arms
- Interactive map of Berrocalejo, Spain
- Coordinates: 39°49′11″N 5°20′58″W
- Country: Spain
- Autonomous community: Extremadura
- Province: Cáceres
- Municipality: Berrocalejo

Area
  - Total: 14 km^{2} (5.4 sq mi)
- Elevation: 368 m (1,207 ft)

Population (2025-01-01)
  - Total: 120
  - Density: 8.6/km^{2} (22/sq mi)
- Time zone: UTC+1 (CET)
  - Summer (DST): UTC+2 (CEST)

Berrocalejo is a municipality located in the province of Cáceres, Extremadura, Spain. According to the 2005 census (INE), the municipality has a population of 115 inhabitants.

== See also ==
- List of municipalities in Cáceres
