= Casas de Miravete =

Coordinates: 39°43′N 5°44′W

Casas de Miravete, Spain
- municipality
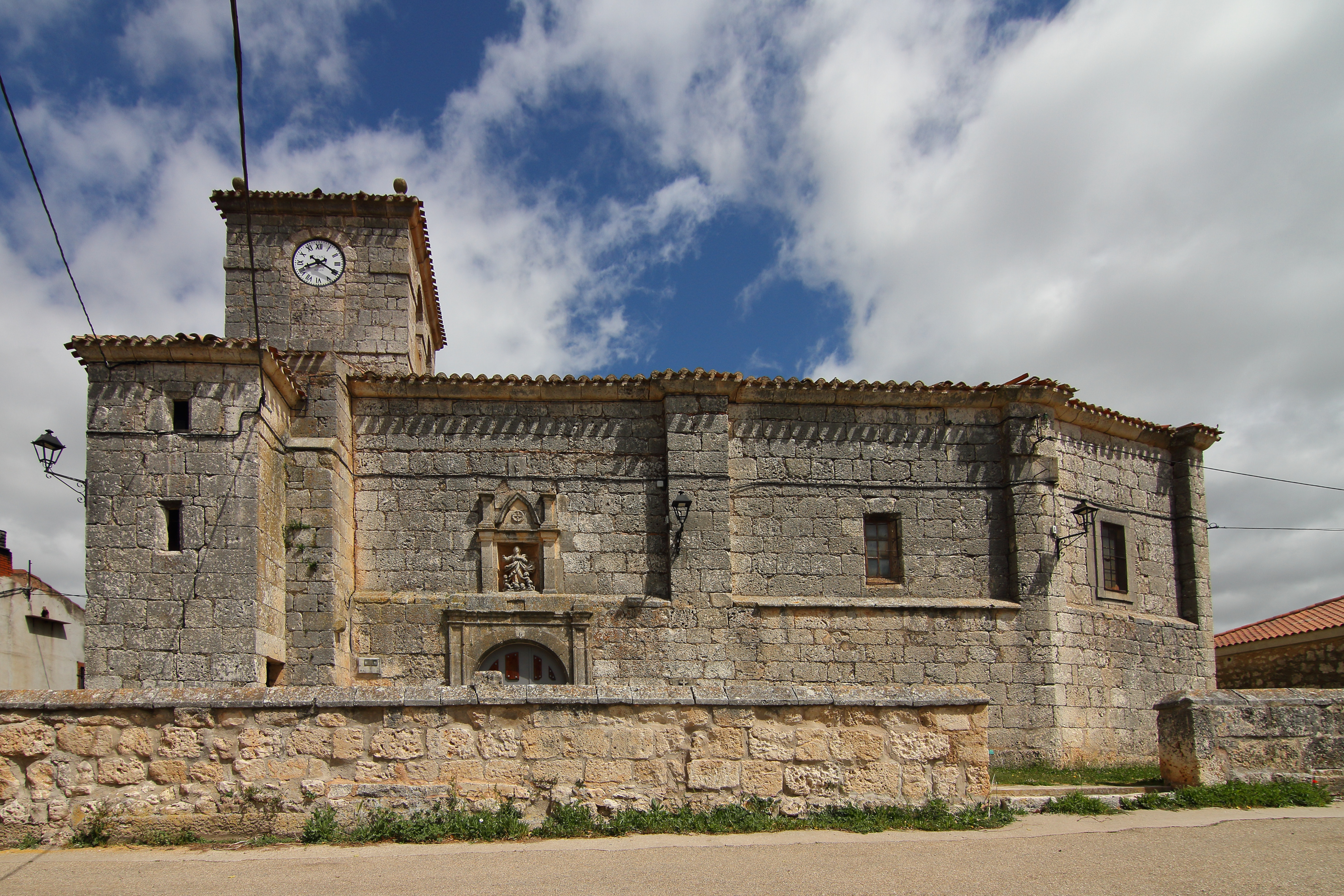
- Casas de Miravete - Church of the Assumption of Our Lady

- Coat of arms
- Interactive map of Casas de Miravete, Spain
- Country: Spain
- Autonomous community: Extremadura
- Province: Cáceres
- Municipality: Casas de Miravete

Area
  - Total: 50 km^{2} (19 sq mi)

Population (2025-01-01)
  - Total: 106
  - Density: 2.1/km^{2} (5.5/sq mi)
- Time zone: UTC+1 (CET)
  - Summer (DST): UTC+2 (CEST)

Casas de Miravete (Spanish pronunciation: [ˈkasas ðe miɾaˈβete]) is a municipality located in the province of Cáceres, Extremadura, Spain. According to the 2006 census (INE), the municipality has a population of 172 inhabitants.

== See also ==
- List of municipalities in Cáceres
