= Navalmoral de la Mata =

- Municipality
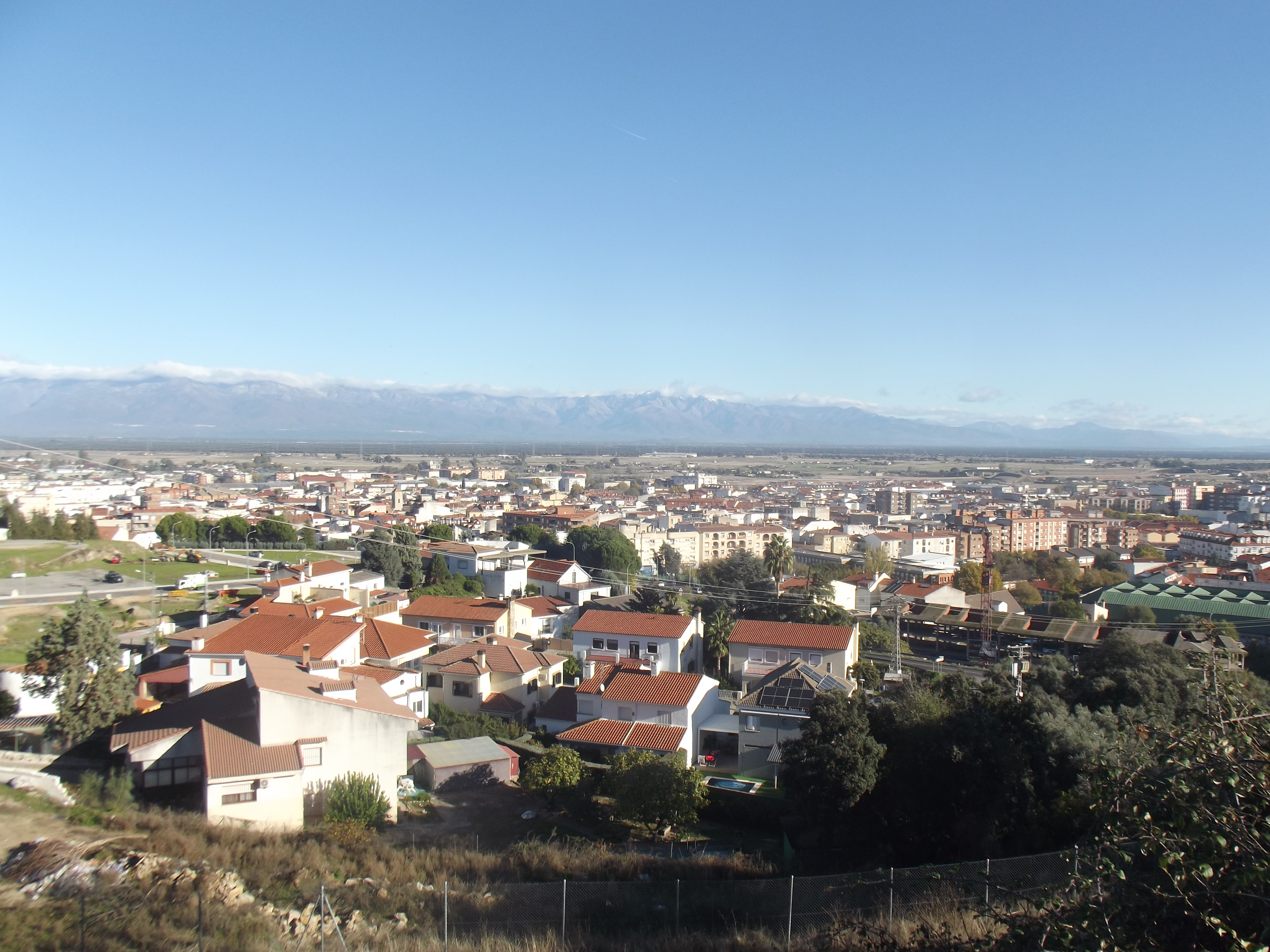
- View from the south

- Flag Coat of arms

- Location within Spain Location within Extremadura
- Coordinates: 39°53′54″N 5°32′25″W
- Country: Spain
- Autonomous community: Extremadura
- Province: Cáceres

Government
  - Mayor: Enrique Hueso Retamosa

Area
  - Total: 155.96 km^{2} (60.22 sq mi)
- Elevation: 291 m (955 ft)

Population (2025-01-01)
  - Total: 17,352
  - Density: 111.26/km^{2} (288.16/sq mi)
- Time zone: UTC+1 (CET)
- Website: Official website

Navalmoral de la Mata (Spanish: [naβalmoˈɾal ðe la ˈmata]) is a municipality of Spain located in the province of Cáceres, autonomous community of Extremadura. Attached to the traditional comarca of Campo Arañuelo, the municipality lies on central-western Iberia, in between the Tagus and Tiétar rivers. In 2016, the municipality had a population of 17,247 inhabitants.

It lies on the A-5 (former N-V) road route connecting Madrid and Portugal.

== History ==
The area of Navalmoral includes remains from the Prehistoric and Roman (villas, bridges, temples etc.) ages. Navalmoral was founded in the late 14th - early 15th century as a communication hub. It became an autonomous commune in the 19th century.

Navalmoral belongs to the natural comarca of Campo Arañuelo.

Communications (roads and bridges) were promoted during the dictatorship of Primo de Rivera (the finishing of several works would linger a long time, though). Initially endorsed by local farmers, the latter removed their support to the regime after it failed to deliver on its promises, turning away from the dictator and ultimately also from the Monarchy, with the population overwhelmingly voting anti-monarchist candidates in the 1931 municipal elections that installed the Second Republic. La Vera and Guadalupe roads were constructed, as well as other less important roads.

In 1930 the Tobacco Fermentation Center (CNCFT) was promoted by locals, boosting the economy of Navalmoral and its comarca. Local anarchists took part of the country-wide December 1933 insurrection.

On 21 July 1936, soon after the beginning of the Spanish Civil War, Navalmoral was seized by the Rebel forces after a swift combat.

Started in 1949, the Rosarito's Irrigation Plan had a remarkable impact on Navalmoral's economy and demography, notably it allowed the expansion of cotton and tobacco based local industries. Another public work of the 20th century was the construction of the Valdecañas Reservoir, which enabled exploitation of the Tagus river, providing significant new funds for both Navalmoral town and its comarca, and thus helping to slow down the 1960s decline in population. Consequently, new districts and schools were built, available running water improved and thanks to the Tiétar river, sewers and other infrastructure improvements were made.

After a period of prosperity the economy began to stagnate, but in 1972 work on the Almaraz Nuclear Power Plant started, which boosted Navalmoral's population and economy again, even though there had been some local opposition to the project.

After the 1979 municipal election, Tomás Yuste Mirón (UCD) was confirmed as Mayor of the municipality. Progress continued, thanks to a significant number of public works which enabled Navalmoral to become the main town in the Campo Arañuelo.

In 2015, Raquel Medina, from the Spanish Socialist Workers' Party (PSOE), became the new mayor.

== Culture ==
The main festival is the annual carnival, when for five days every early spring three large parades are held.

== Economy ==
Navalmoral de la Mata is to be the base of "Expacio-Navalmoral", a logistical-industrial estate which will process, supply and deliver raw material and goods to major centres such as Madrid.

== Climate ==
Climate data for Navalmoral de la Mata, Spain (2001-2025 averages, 269m above sea level)
Month	Jan	Feb	Mar	Apr	May	Jun	Jul	Aug	Sep	Oct	Nov	Dec	Year
Mean daily maximum °C (°F)	12.9 (55.2)	15.7 (60.3)	18.1 (64.6)	21.3 (70.3)	26.4 (79.5)	32.0 (89.6)	36.4 (97.5)	36.3 (97.3)	30.3 (86.5)	24.0 (75.2)	16.7 (62.1)	13.5 (56.3)	23.6 (74.5)
Mean daily minimum °C (°F)	2.9 (37.2)	4.0 (39.2)	6.8 (44.2)	8.3 (46.9)	11.4 (52.5)	16.0 (60.8)	17.9 (64.2)	18.2 (64.8)	15.1 (59.2)	11.7 (53.1)	7.6 (45.7)	4.7 (40.5)	10.4 (50.7)
Average rainfall mm (inches)	73.8 (2.91)	56.5 (2.22)	66.4 (2.61)	58.0 (2.28)	20.5 (0.81)	17.1 (0.67)	3.0 (0.12)	11.4 (0.45)	38.4 (1.51)	118.0 (4.65)	80.8 (3.18)	81.1 (3.19)	625 (24.6)
Mean monthly sunshine hours	160.1	201.3	196.9	216.6	282.2	276.0	320.8	306.5	236.3	203.1	152.8	141.7	2,694.3
Source: Météo-France

== Notable people ==
- Rafael Cerro (born 1993), Spanish bullfighter and bullfight manager, born here.

== See also ==
- List of municipalities in Cáceres
