= Tiétar (river) =

River in Spain

Coordinates: 40°20′0″N 4°36′0″W

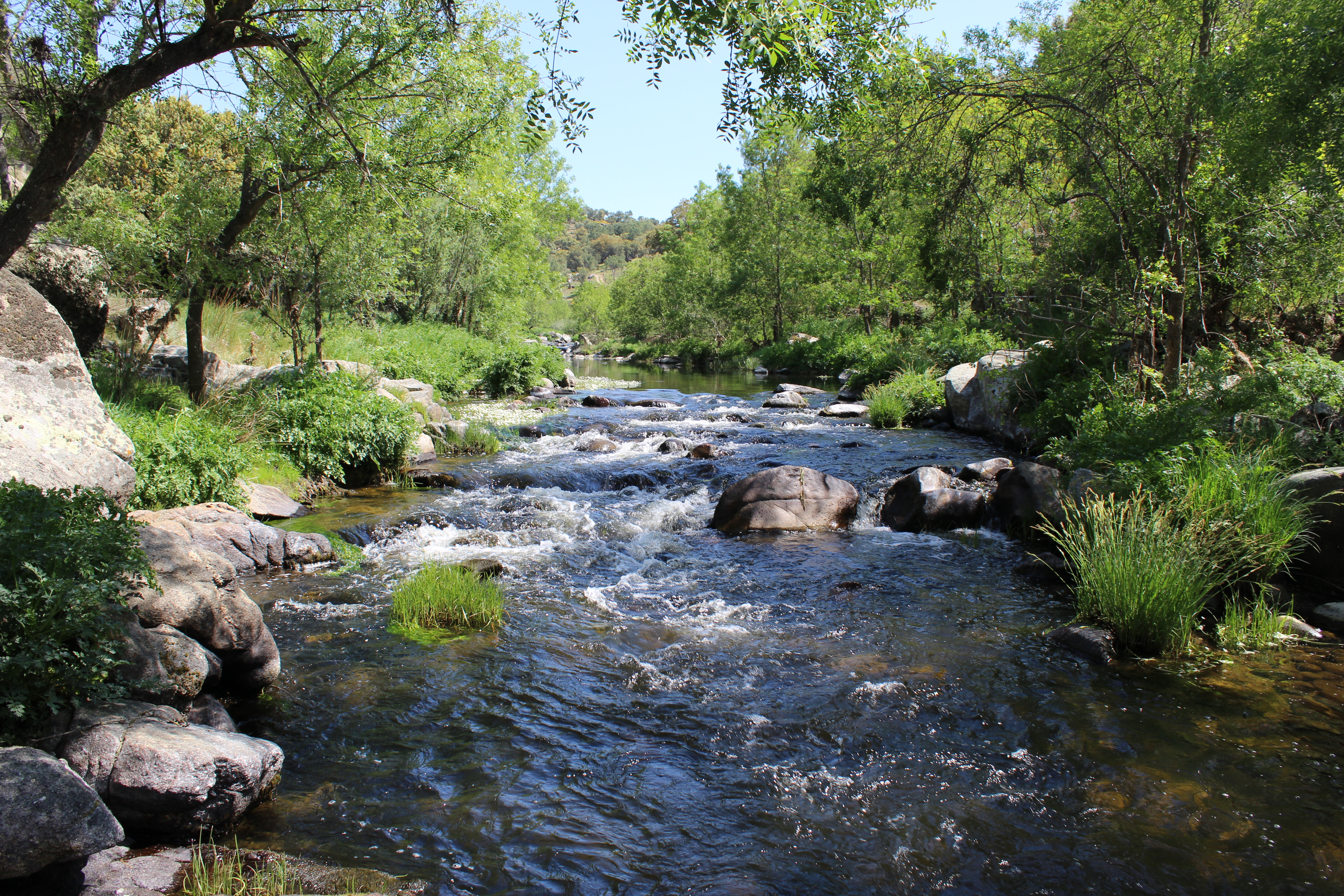
- The Tiétar in the province of Toledo

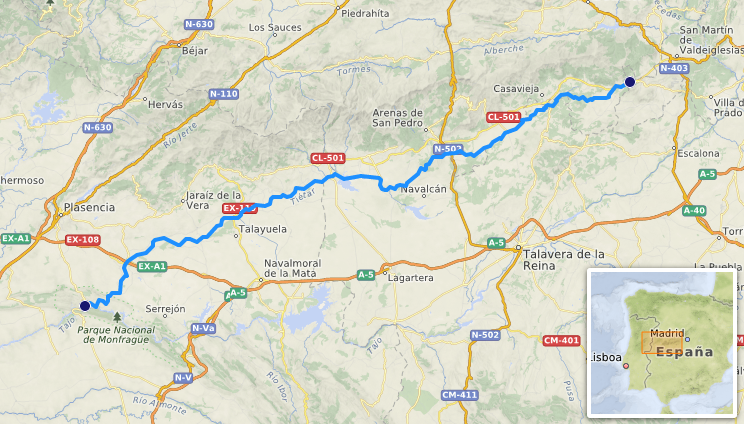

Location
- Country: Spain

Physical characteristics
- Source
  - location: Puerto de la Venta del Cojo
  - elevation: 1,200 m (3,900 ft)
- Mouth
  - location: Tagus
  - elevation: 215 m (705 ft)
- Length: 170 km (110 mi)
- Basin size: 4,459 km^{2} (1,722 sq mi)

Basin features
- Progression: Tagus→ Atlantic Ocean

The Tiétar is a river located in the Iberian Peninsula. It originates in the Spanish municipality of Rozas de Puerto Real, at the eastern end of the Sierra de Gredos, a mountain range from which it receives numerous tributaries. The river flows through the Spanish provinces of Madrid, Ávila, Toledo, and Cáceres, ultimately emptying into the Tagus River at Monfragüe.

== Hydronymy ==
According to Chavarría Vargas and Martínez Enamorado, the hydronym "Tiétar" is of uncertain origin. They mention the possibility of a pre-Latin term Těttare, potentially connected to the Indo-European root teter- (commonly used for various types of gallinaceous birds). They consider a Latin origin (from the adjective tětter: "dark," "gloomy") to be less likely. The first appearance of the hydronym in Christian written sources dates back to 1189; however, its first mention in Arabic chronicles could have occurred around the 10th century with a transliterated form such as Tāt.r.

== Course ==
The Tiétar River begins at a place called La Venta del Cojo, in the municipality of Rozas de Puerto Real, where various springs, gorges, and streams feed its course until it reaches the Monfragüe National Park.

The river subsequently flows through the municipalities of Santa María del Tiétar, Sotillo de la Adrada, La Adrada, Piedralaves, Casavieja, Mijares, Gavilanes, Pedro Bernardo, Lanzahíta, Arenas de San Pedro, and Candeleda in the province of Ávila; through La Iglesuela del Tiétar, Sartajada, Buenaventura, Parrillas, Navalcán, Oropesa, Lagartera, and La Calzada de Oropesa in the province of Toledo; and through the region of La Vera in Cáceres.

In the Cáceres section of its course, it flows between the regions of La Vera and Campo Arañuelo, areas of great agricultural value. The river empties into the Tagus in the Monfragüe National Park after nearly 150 km, near Villarreal de San Carlos. Its mouth into the Tagus has a variable width, depending on the water levels of the reservoirs in the latter river. Near its mouth, the Tiétar cuts through a small mountain range to reach the Tagus, dividing it into the Sierra de Santa Catalina and the Sierra de la Urraca, a favorable location utilized for the construction of the dam that exists there.

Its main tributaries are the Guadyerbas River and other gorges and streams that originate in the Sierra de Gredos of the Central System and the Sierra de San Vicente. Its hydrological regime is pluvio-nival, with a maximum flow in winter (rain) and spring (snowmelt), and a marked minimum in summer.

== See also ==
- Monfragüe
- List of rivers of Spain
