= Tiétar =

Tiétar may refer to:

- Tiétar River, a river of Spain.
- Tiétar, Cáceres, a municipality located in the province of Cáceres, Extremadura, Spain.
- Tejeda de Tiétar, a municipality located in the province of Cáceres, Extremadura, Spain.
- Santa María del Tiétar, a municipality located in the province of Ávila, Castile and León, Spain.
