= Gerardo Martín Gallego =

- Born: 1933; Madrid, Spain
- Died: 2022 (aged 88–89); Madrid, Spain
- Citizenship: Spanish
- Occupation: Sculptor
- Spouse: Susana C. Polac

Gerardo Martín Gallego (Madrid, 1933 – Madrid, 2022) was a Spanish sculptor.

== Biography ==
He was born in Madrid in 1933. He studied cabinetmaking at the School of Arts and Crafts in Madrid. He began his career as a sculptor working with wood and iron. He died in Madrid in 2022.

Sculptural abstraction in the 1970s followed two essential paths: the expressive and the geometric, sharing a common thread: the importance of iron and steel as sculptural support materials. Gerardo Martín developed free-flowing abstract works, focusing on the study of forms in motion with a more expressionistic and informal style.

In the sixties he shared a studio and workshop with his wife, the sculptor Susana C. Polac, in the Sierra de Gredos, in La Adrada (Ávila).

As a sculptor, he created works for various churches, monuments, and fountains. Much of his work can be found in important cities around the world, as well as in numerous locations throughout Spain.

== Works ==
He stood out for being the author of various ornamental fountains in the city of Madrid, such as those in the Plaza de Mariano de Cavia or the old Red de San Luis.

His extensive work can be found in places as diverse as:

- Church of the Twelve Apostles, Augsburg (Germany).
- Urbar Church, Koblenz (Germany).
- Pontifical German College, Rome.
- Madrid City Hall, decorative sculptures of the fountains in the Red de San Luis and the Plaza de Mariano Cavia, Madrid.
- Plaza de Colón. Rodríguez de la Fuente Park.
- German School of Madrid. German Hospital of Madrid
- Catholic Church of Tokyo and Baptist Church in Madrid.
- Barcelona: German School of Barcelona.
- Official Headquarters of the Société Générale de Banque de Sevilla.
- Stork sculptures on the A5 motorway in Toledo: (Oropesa).
- Butterfly sculpture in the Nava Park, in La Adrada (Ávila).
- Sculpture "Bees in La Alcarria". Highway A2 km 103 (Guadalajara).
- Beetles in Guadalajara.

The most representative fountains of this sculptor:

- The fountain of the Red de San Luis, also popularly known as the Swan Fountain because of the moving metal birds that adorned it, was built in 1972 by the municipal architect Manuel Herrero Palacios and sculptures by Gerardo Martín Gallego.

In this Madrid square stood, initially, a fountain designed by Francisco Javier de Mariátegui, Chief Architect-Plumber of the City, sculpted by José Tomás and inaugurated in 1832 to commemorate the birth of Isabella II of Spain; known as the Fountain of the Galapagos, it was moved to the Plaza de Santa Ana in 1868 and has been located in El Retiro Park since 1879. It was replaced by the pavilion at the entrance to the José Antonio Metro station – now Gran Vía – a 1919 work by Antonio Palacios, based on a design from the previous year, which was dismantled and moved to Porriño (Pontevedra), the architect's birthplace, between 1970 and 1971. In one of the last renovations, the birds were removed and never replaced, until finally the entire fountain disappeared, now in municipal storage.

- Mariano de Cavia Fountain. The defining feature of this fountain is that when the water flows, the bronze seagulls move their wings. Although it may seem somewhat naive now, at the time it was a prime example of how to combine technology and art. The fountain replicates a similar design to the seagull fountain in the Cecilio Rodríguez Gardens in Retiro Park. In this case, the seagulls take flight, are arranged geometrically, and their wings move with a mechanical system, demonstrating the artist's commitment to incorporating technology into artistic design.
- Glorieta de las Avutardas in Valdemoro (Madrid).
