= Castle of Cabrera =

Castle in the Balearic Islands, Spain

Coordinates: 39°09′09″N 2°55′54″E

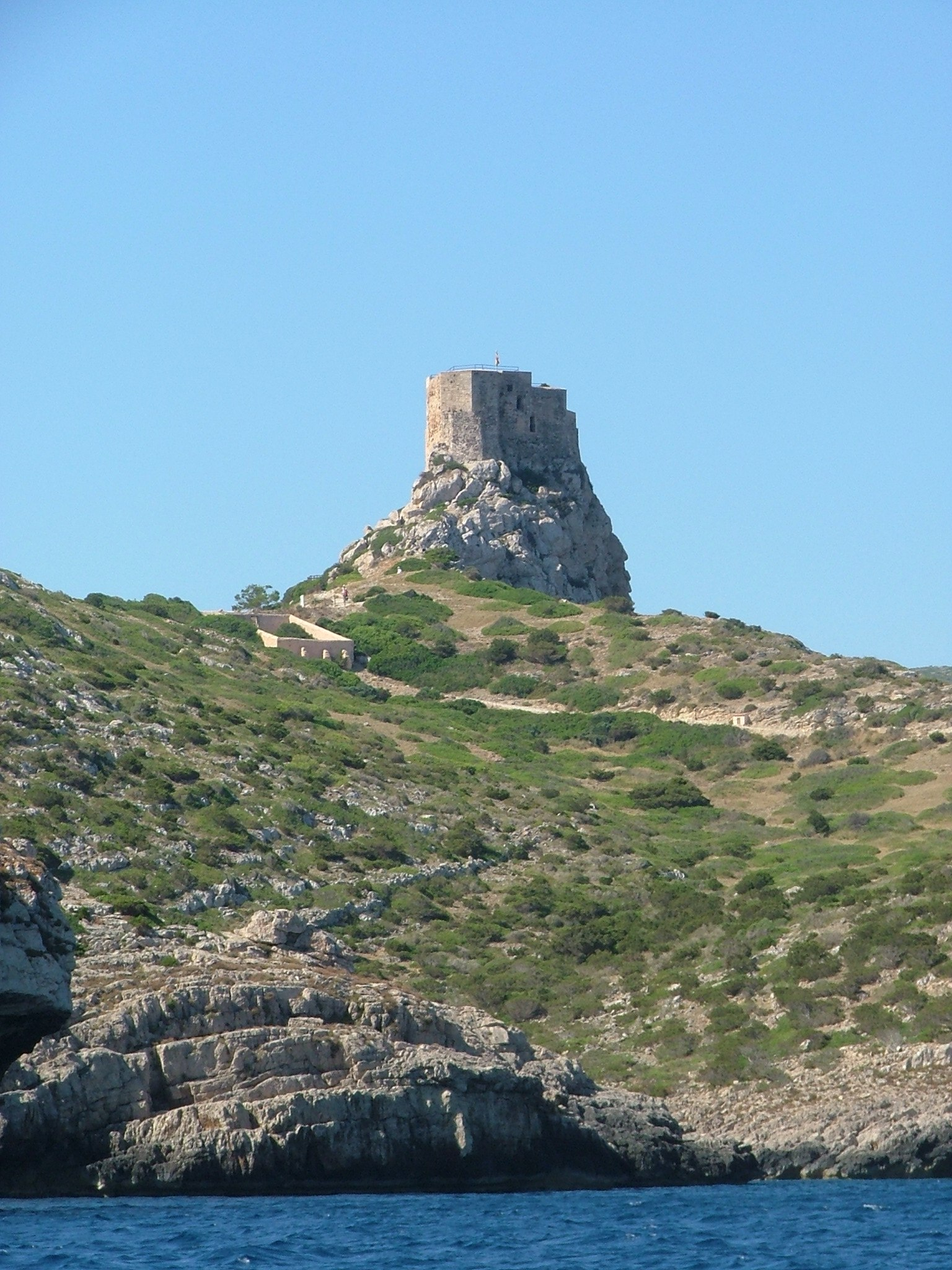
View of the northern part of the castle

The Castle of Cabrera (Spanish: Castillo de Cabrera, Catalan: Castell de Cabrera) is a castle on Cabrera, one of the Balearic Islands in Spain. It is one of the main attractions of the island.

The castle was built in the 14th century; the first documentary evidence dates back to 1400. The castle initially served mainly to repel pirate raids on Cabrera, and later, up until the 19th century, during military operations in the Balearic Islands, its defensive significance was more pronounced.

It is considered a monument of historical significance.
