= Monfragüe =

Protected area in Spain

Monfragüe National Park
- IUCN category II (national park)
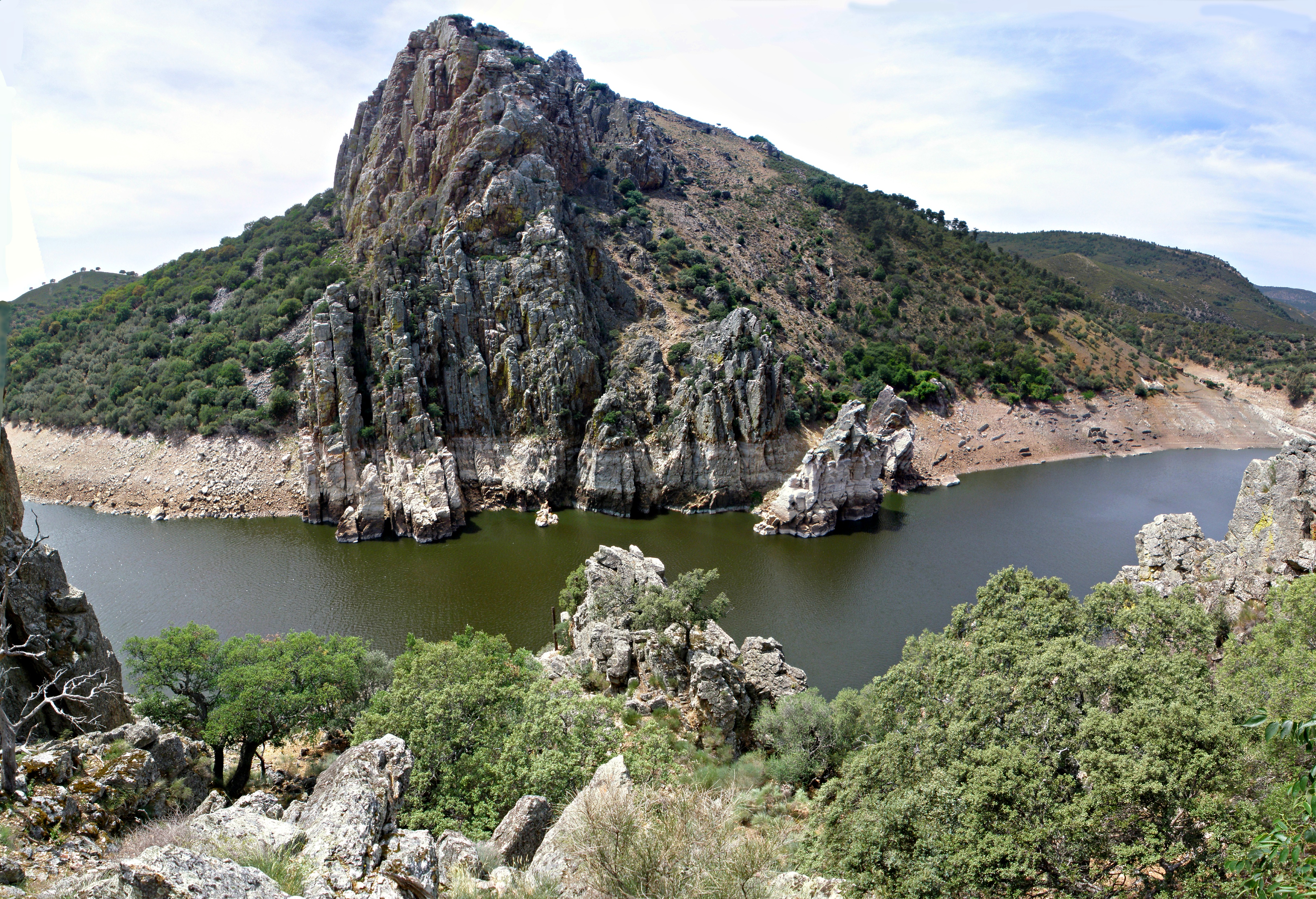
- A view of the Salto del Gitano
- Location of Monfragüe
- Location: Extremadura
- Coordinates: 39°50′27″N 6°01′48″W
- Area: 181 km^{2} (70 sq mi)
- Established: 2007
- Visitors: 331,788 (in 2008)

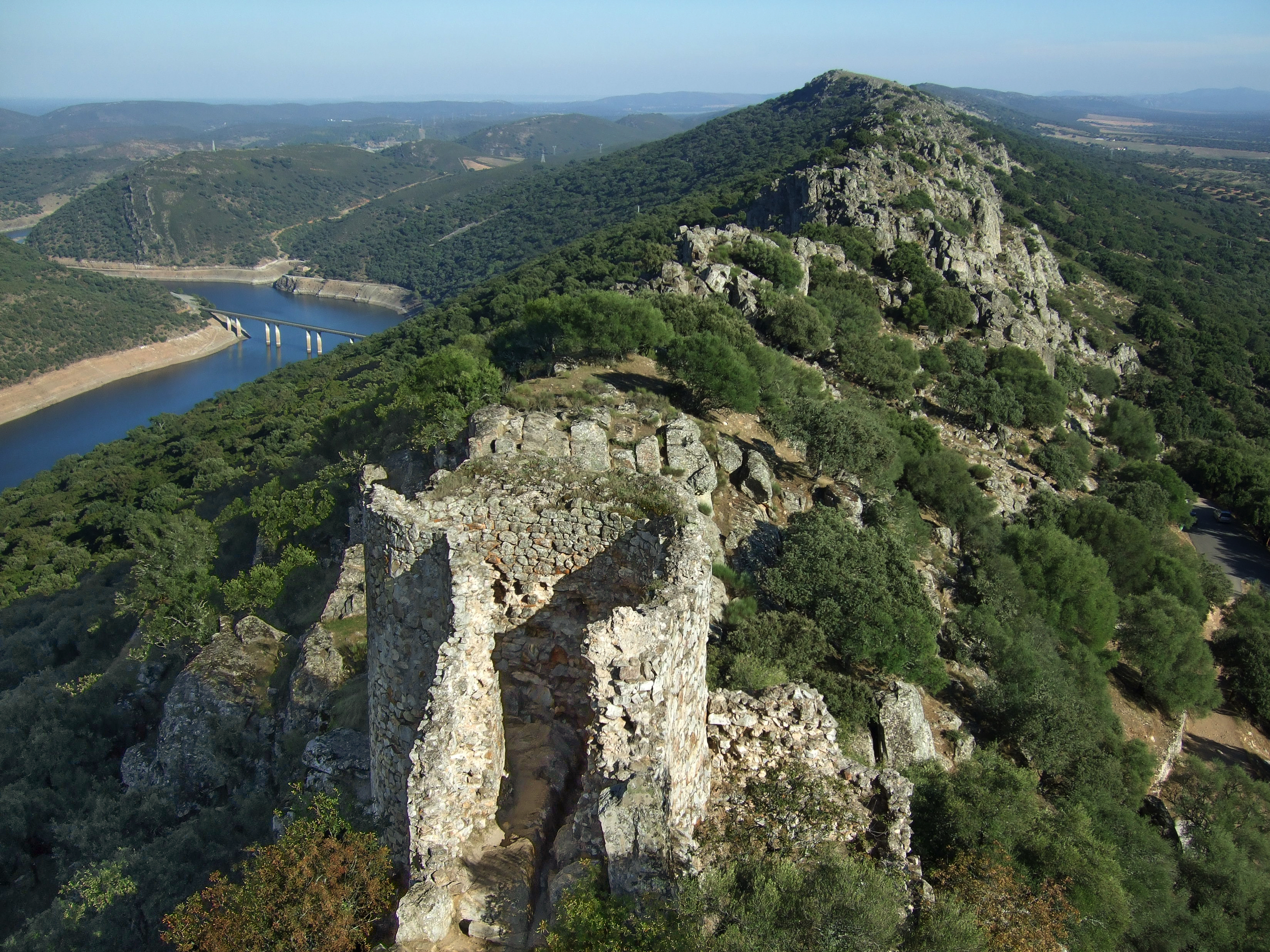
A view of the national park with the ruined Monfragüe castle in the foreground

Monfragüe is a comarca in Extremadura, western Spain, and the site of Monfragüe National Park. The national park lies in the province of Cáceres, roughly between Plasencia, Trujillo, and the city of Cáceres. It covers 18,118 hectares (181.18 km^{2}) and extends along the valley of the Tagus River, where the Tiétar River joins it. Its habitats include extensive scrubland, oak woodland, cliffs, and rocky outcrops.

The area was declared a natural park in 1979, recognised by UNESCO as a biosphere reserve in 2003, and designated a Spanish national park in 2007. It is particularly noted for its birdlife and is protected as a Special Protection Area for birds. Monfragüe is an important breeding area for raptors, including cinereous vultures, griffon vultures, and Spanish imperial eagles, and also supports species such as black storks, deer, wild boar, and reintroduced Iberian lynx.

== Location ==
Monfragüe is a comarca in Spain, i.e. a county, with no administrative role in Extremadura, western Spain.

Monfragüe is famous for its national park by the same name, which is noted for its bird-life. It is situated in the center of a triangle formed by Plasencia, Trujillo and the city of Cáceres within the province of Cáceres. The park runs from east to west along the valley of the River Tagus or Tajo. which cut through a long mountainous ridge, and created a rock face, the Peña Falcon, 'falcon rock' on the western side. On the eastern side is the Castle of Monfragüe. The River Tietar enters the park from the north-east and joins the Tagus just to the east of Peña Falcon. The only village in the park is Villareal de San Carlos (population 28). The park occupies an area of 18,118 hectares.

== History ==
The area's and the Park's name comes from the Latin Monsfragorum, which means "lush mountain".

=== Prehistoric period ===
The mountains of Monfragüe house a great number of caves with prehistoric paintings from the Copper Age, Bronze Age and Iron Age for example the "Cueva del Castillo", located on the south face of the Sierra de las Corchuelas. Around the Park are remains of pre-Roman times. In Miravete remnants of an old castle exist, and in Malpartida de Plasencia there is an estate known as "El Calamoco". A warrior stele found in Torrejón el Rubio and the Treasury of Serradilla are evidence of a highly hierarchical agricultural society inhabiting this area.

=== Roman period ===
Remains of Roman roads, bridges, fountains and gravestones can be found, since the park is close to the Ruta de la Plata (Silver Route). A section of the route, which goes down to the bridge of the Cardinal from Villarreal, can be considered as a vestige of Roman road. As in almost all Spanish geography, valleys provide the layout for the road. Remains of watchtowers exist, in Cerro Gimio for example.

=== 9th–19th centuries ===
During the ninth century, the castle of Monfragüe was built with five towers and two perimeters of walls. What is visible today are remnants of multiple restorations after military orders conquered it for King Alfonso VIII, with a round tower from the twelfth century and a pentagonal one from the fifteenth century.

In 1450, Juan de Carvajal ordered the Cardinal's Bridge to be built entirely from granite ashlars; it facilitated communications between Plasencia and Trujillo. Since the bridge was practically the only one crossing the Tagus in the Extremadura, it gave rise to pillage, turning the area into a "paradise" of bandits and robbers hidden in its steep and impenetrable mountain ranges.

At the beginning of the eighteenth century, the Spanish War of Succession seriously affected the area: The village of Monfragüe disappeared, inhabitants took refuge in the nearby village of Corchuelas, and the village of Piñuela at the other end of the mountain range was seriously damaged. Carlos III de Espana founded a village halfway between the "port of La Serrana" and the Puente del Cardenal, called Villarreal of San Carlos. It had a church, a fountain and barracks, but in spite of the privileges granted to its inhabitants, it never became more than a small village linked to Serradilla due to the danger and poverty of the area.

The Spanish War of Independence destroyed the Castle of Monfragüe, the Bridge of the Cardinal and Castillejo del Pico in Miravete and Corchuelas, whose inhabitants fled to Torrejón the Rubio, Serradilla and Malpartida de Plasencia.

=== 20th century ===
During the Spanish Civil War in the nineteenthirties, the Extremadura was taken over rapidly. Rather than the conflict itself, the worst aspects were the hunger and poverty which followed. The impenetrable mountains with their maquis shrubland of the region were important to the highlander groups commanded by famous guerrillas like "Quincoces", "Chaquetalarga" (Joaquín Ventas Cintas) and "the French" (Pedro Díaz Monje),

In 1966, construction of the dam at Torrejón el Rubio, and the Alcántara Dam in 1969 altered the landscape irreversibly, as it submerged the wild beauty of the Tagus riverbanks along with its ecological and ethnological wealth.

In 1968, Jesus Garzón arrived in the area, enamored of the beauty of Monfragüe and dedicated himself to nature conservation. He battled with the administration, the owners of neighboring estates, politicians and mayors of the area, but his commitment, supported by scientists and nature lovers resulted in the 4 April 1979 declaration of Monfragüe as a natural park, a lower level of protection than a national park.

In 1991, Monfragüe was declared as a Special Protection Area for birds, During the following years, the conservationist mentality, the infrastructure in Villarreal and publication efforts about the riches of the Park were strengthened. Since 2003, it has been recognised by UNESCO as a Biosphere reserve. In May 2004, it was enlarged to the actual ZEPA "Monfragüe y Dehesas del entomo", which covers 116,160 hectares. After twenty-five years Monfragüe became a national park by law on 2 March 2007.

At the end of 2016, the area also received recognition as a dark-sky preserve.

== Biodiversity ==
Habitas in the park include extensive dense scrub, small oak woodlands, and numerous cliffs and rock faces. The land is mainly used for traditional, low-intensive farming. However, there were two major changes in the years 1960–70: the river Tagus was dammed, affecting its course through the park and in 1970 brutal reforestation with non-indigenous eucalyptus and pine began. For a planned but never built paper industry in Navalmoral de la Mata many hectares of the Park were desolated and irreversibly altered by terraces built with heavy machinery. The Sierra de Miravete and ravines of the streams Malvecino and Barbaón received a hard blow and important thickets of the Mediterranean forest disappeared.

The non-indigenous species are being eradicated. Commercial forestry is prohibited in Spanish national parks.

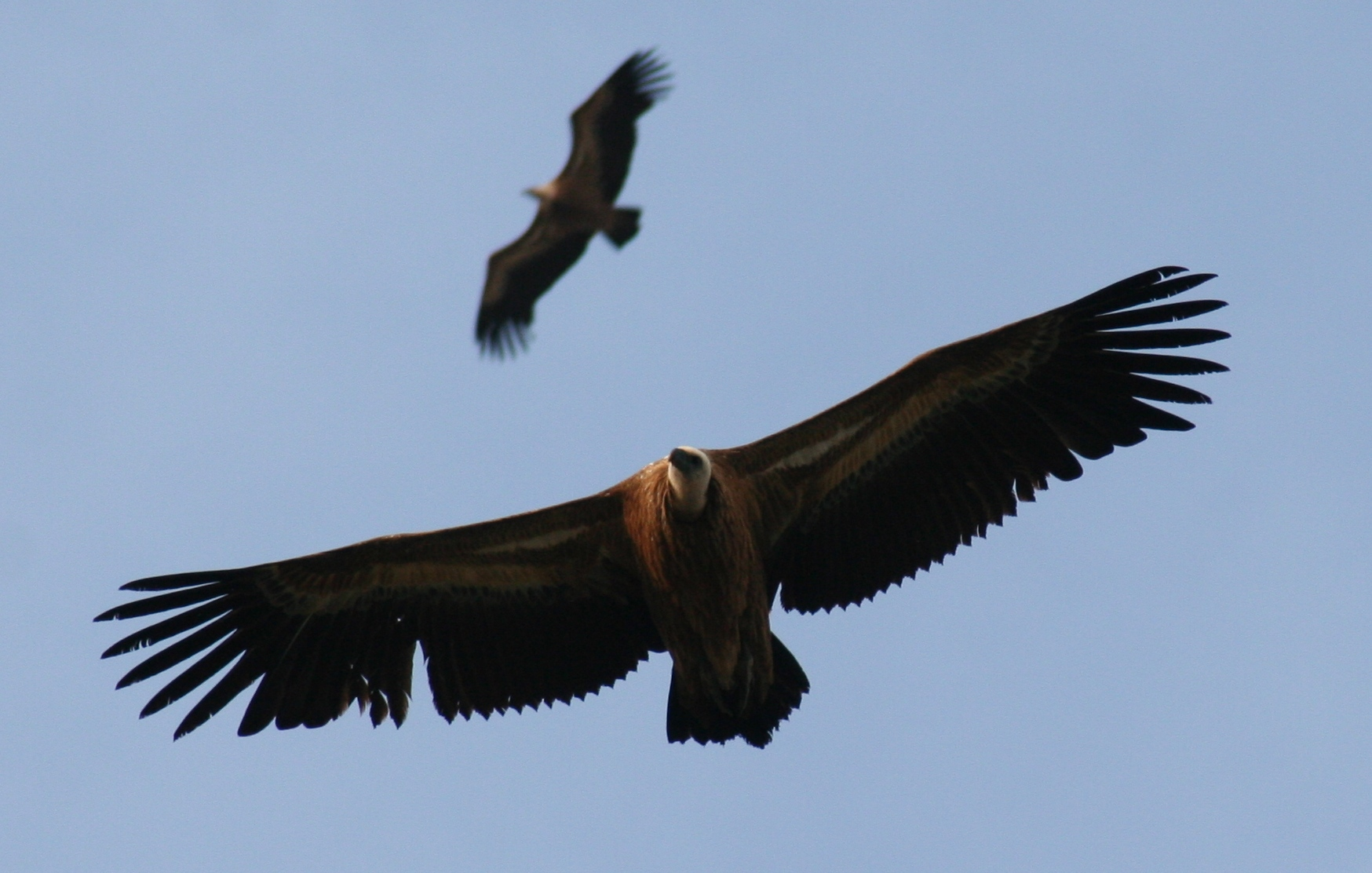
Griffon vultures (Gyps fulvus) in flight over the park.

=== Birds ===
In 1988 the European Union designated Monfrague a Special Protection Area (SPA) for bird-life. The SPA (or ZEPA, the equivalent acronym in Spanish) extends beyond the park, where the nesting sites are concentrated, into the surrounding dehesas, which provide food for the birds.

Monfrague is an outstanding site for raptors, with more than 15 regular breeding species. including the world's largest colony of cinereous vultures (over 300 pairs), it has the world's highest concentration of Spanish imperial eagles (more than 10 pairs), a large population of griffon vultures (over 600 pairs), and several pairs of Egyptian vultures, golden eagles and Bonelli's eagles. The crags and cliffs on the north side of the river midway through the park draw photographers from all over Europe and the Americas. The government has built observation blinds throughout the course of the river.

Other breeding birds for which the park is important are black storks and Eurasian eagle owls and there is a high density of Iberian magpies. It is also one of the few locations in Europe where white-rumped swifts breed.

=== Other wildlife ===
Iberian lynx survived for a long time before numbers decreased. They were reintroduced and have since been doing well. Deer and wild boar live in the park.

== Gallery ==
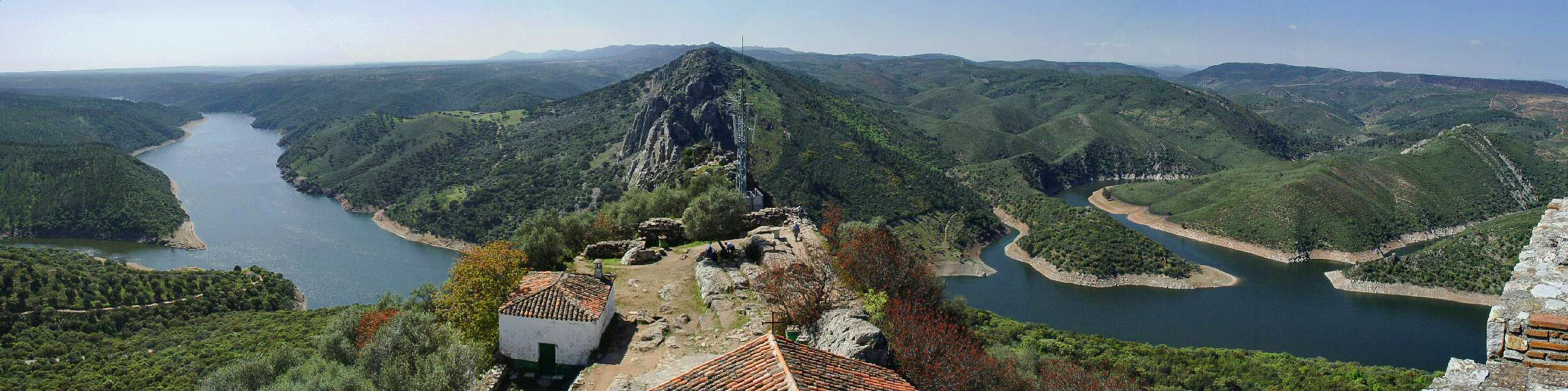
National Park of Monfragüe, in Extremadura. View from the Castle.

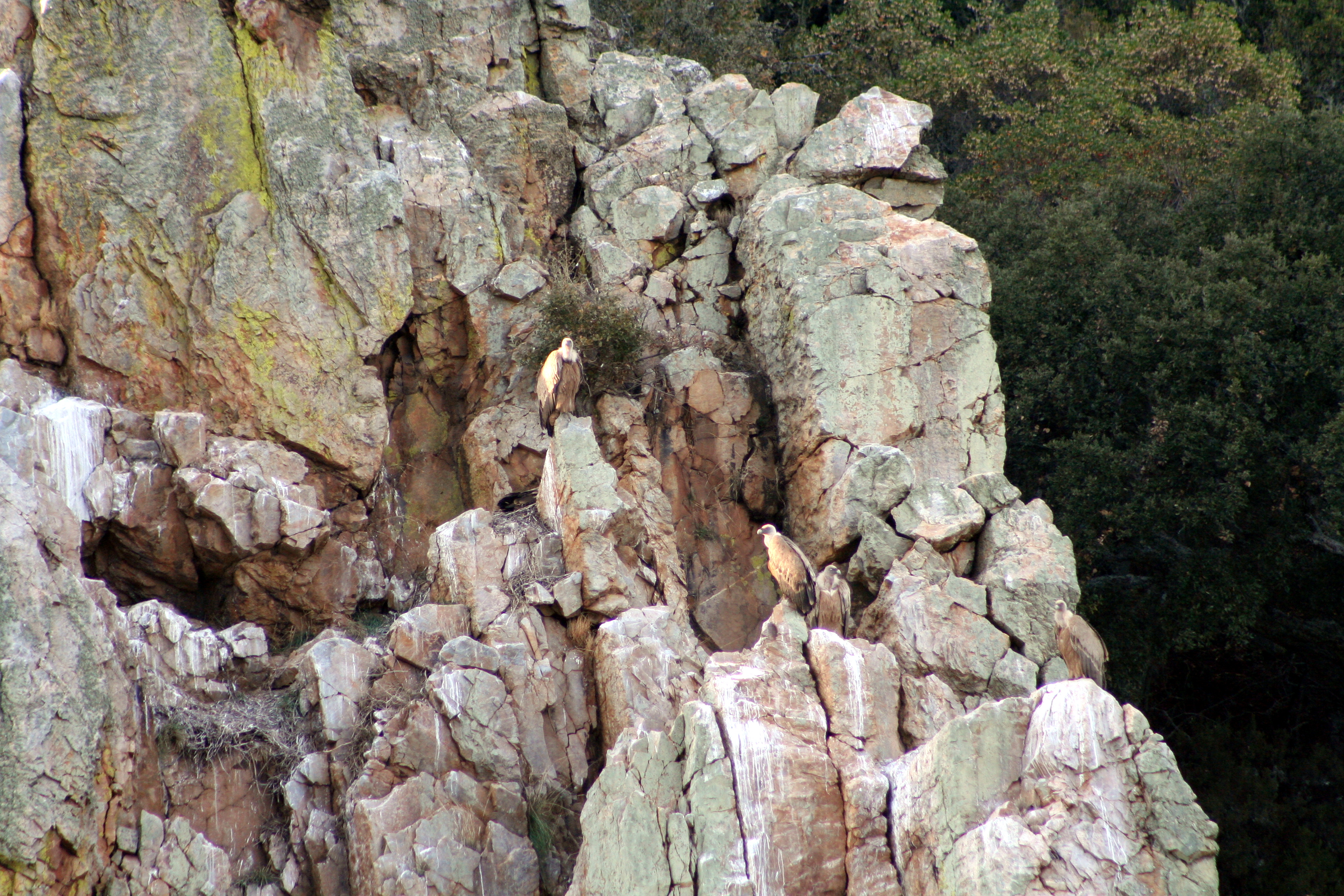
Griffon vultures (Gyps fulvus) in the rocks of Monfragüe.

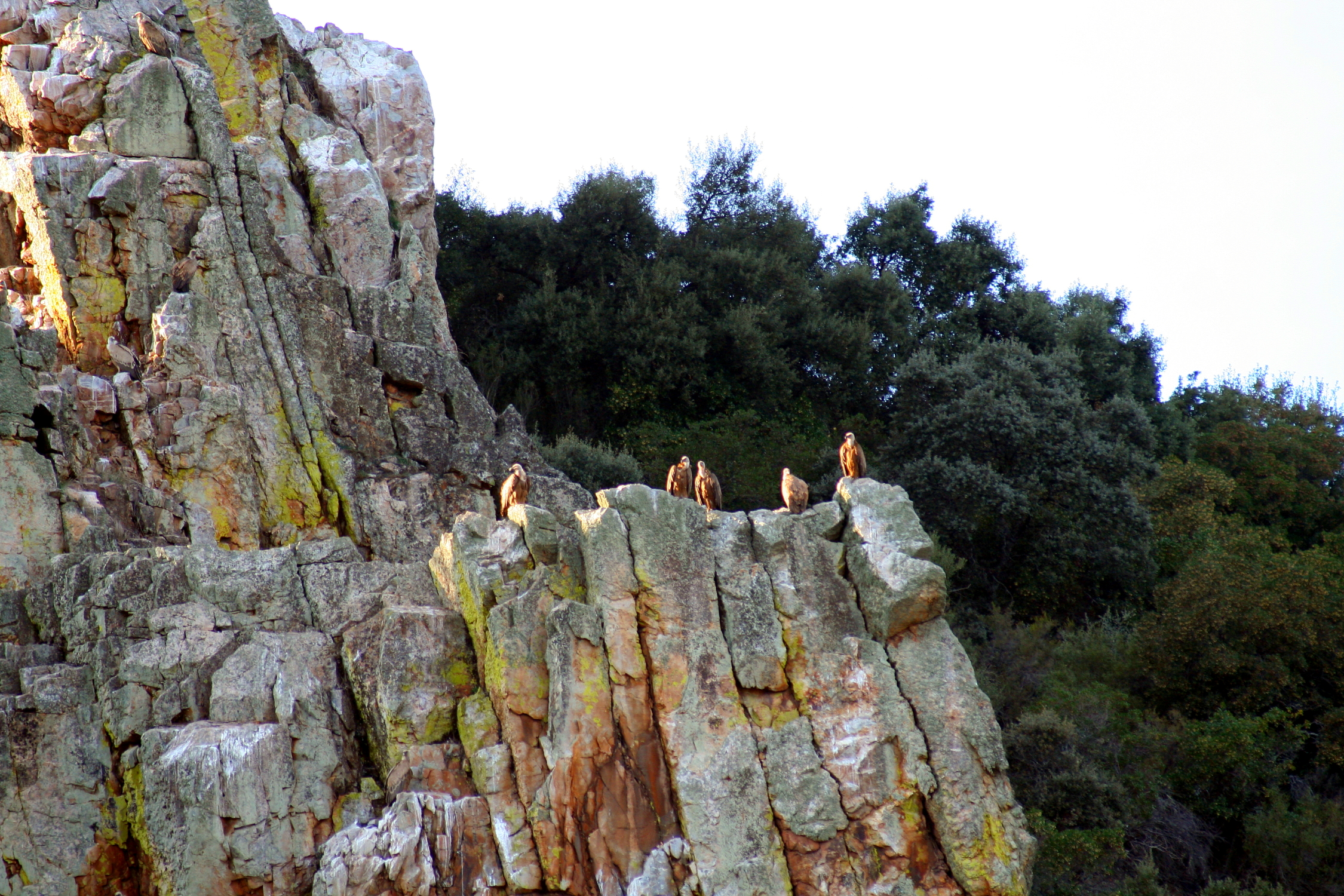
Griffon vultures (Gyps fulvus) in the rocks of Monfragüe.

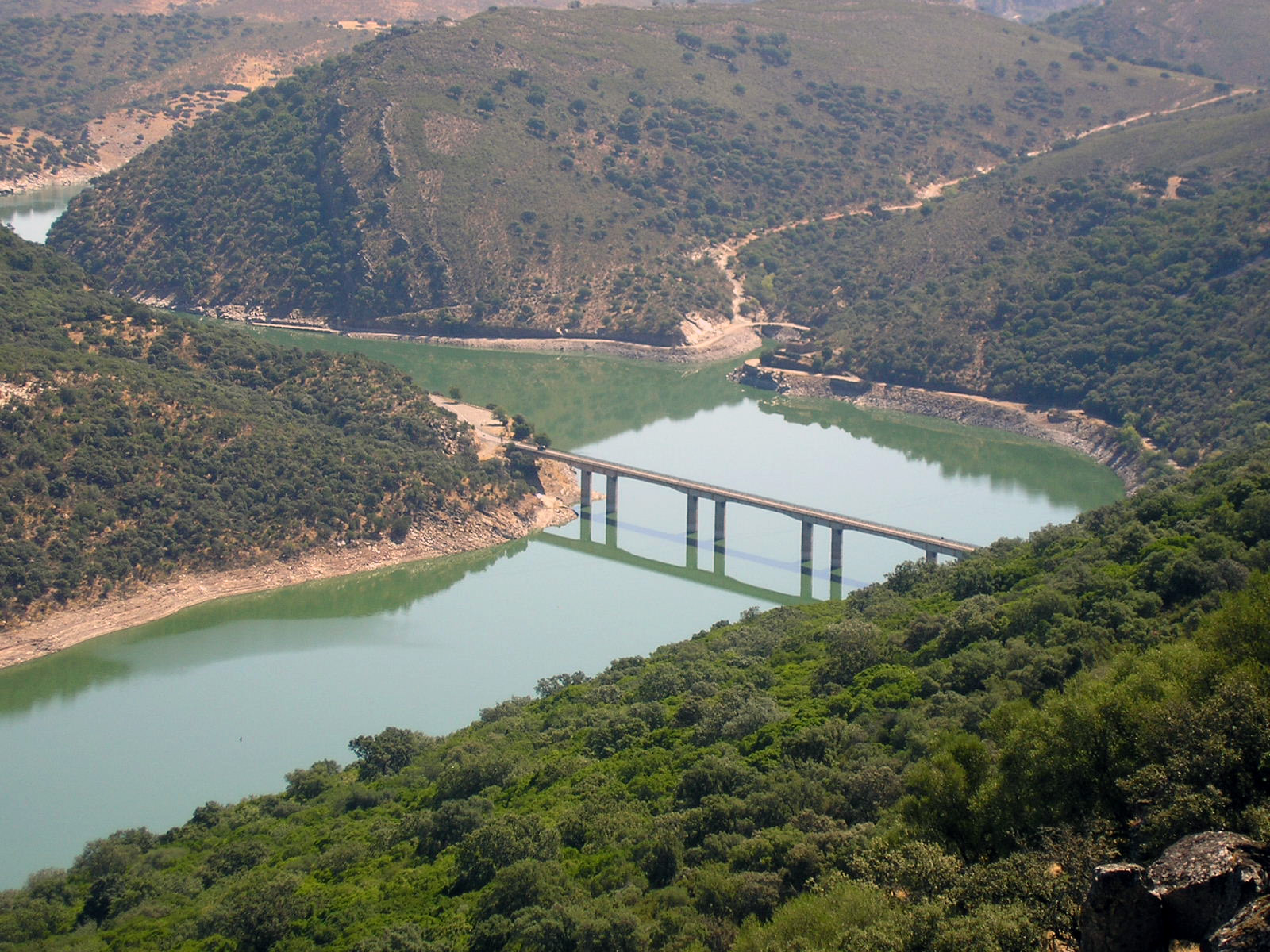
Bridge over the Tagus River as it passes through the national park.

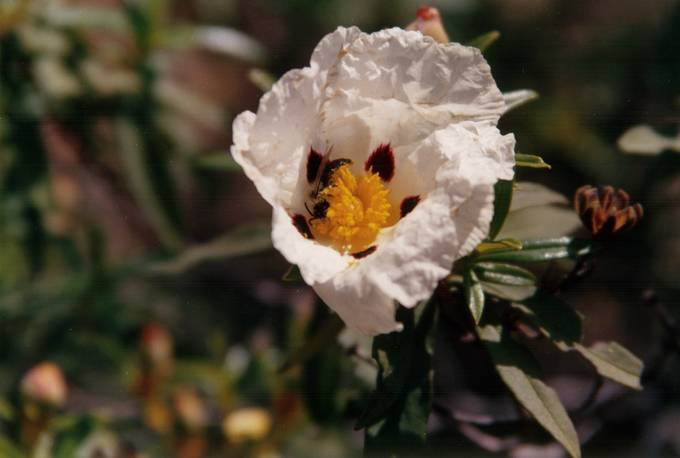
Jara in bloom in Monfragüe.

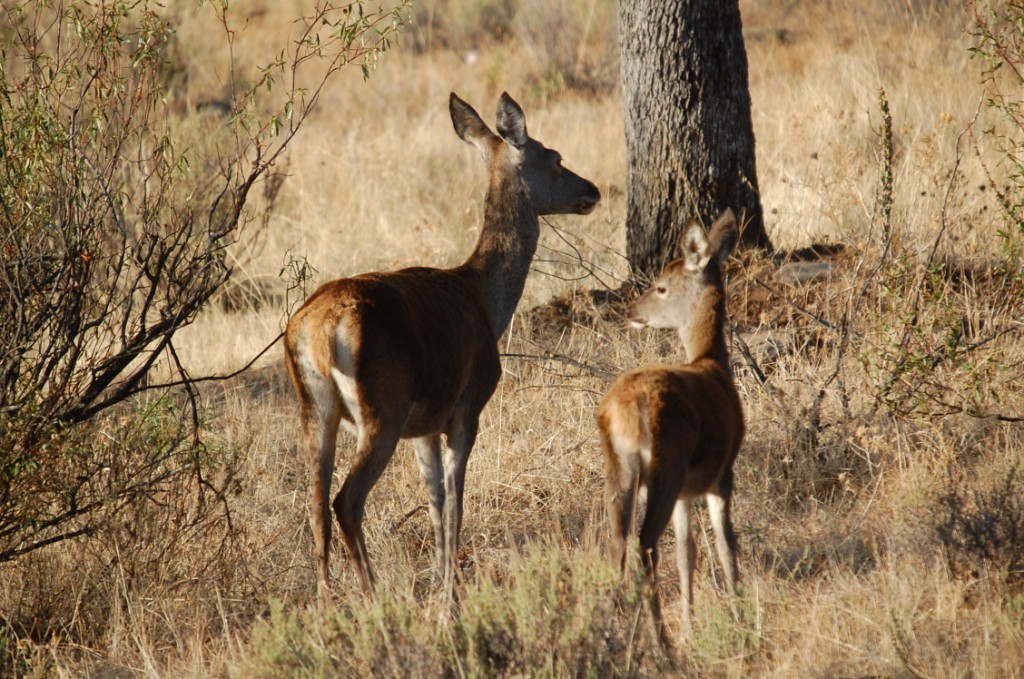
Deer during the 2008 roar.

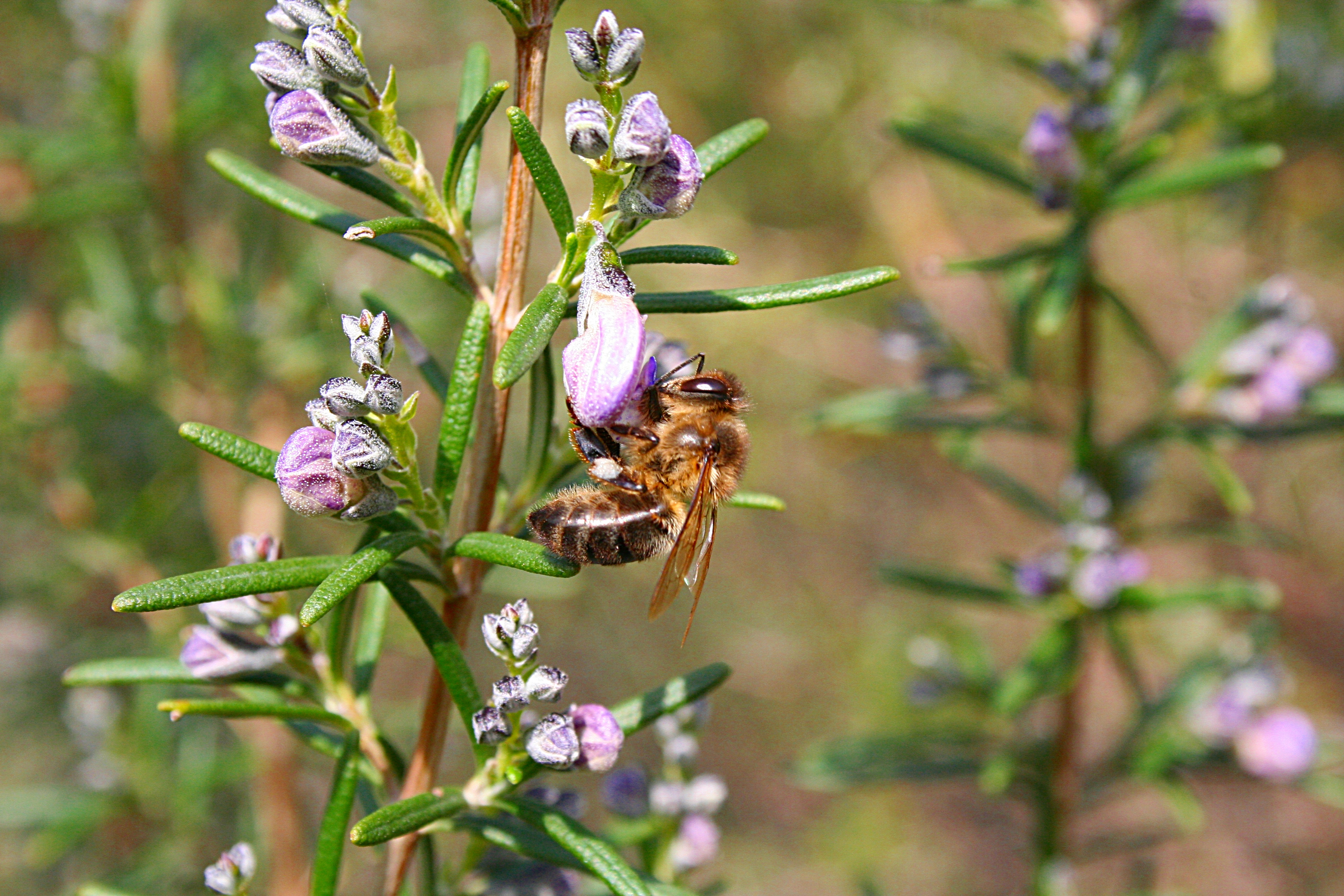
Bee feeding on nectar in the Monfragüe National Park.

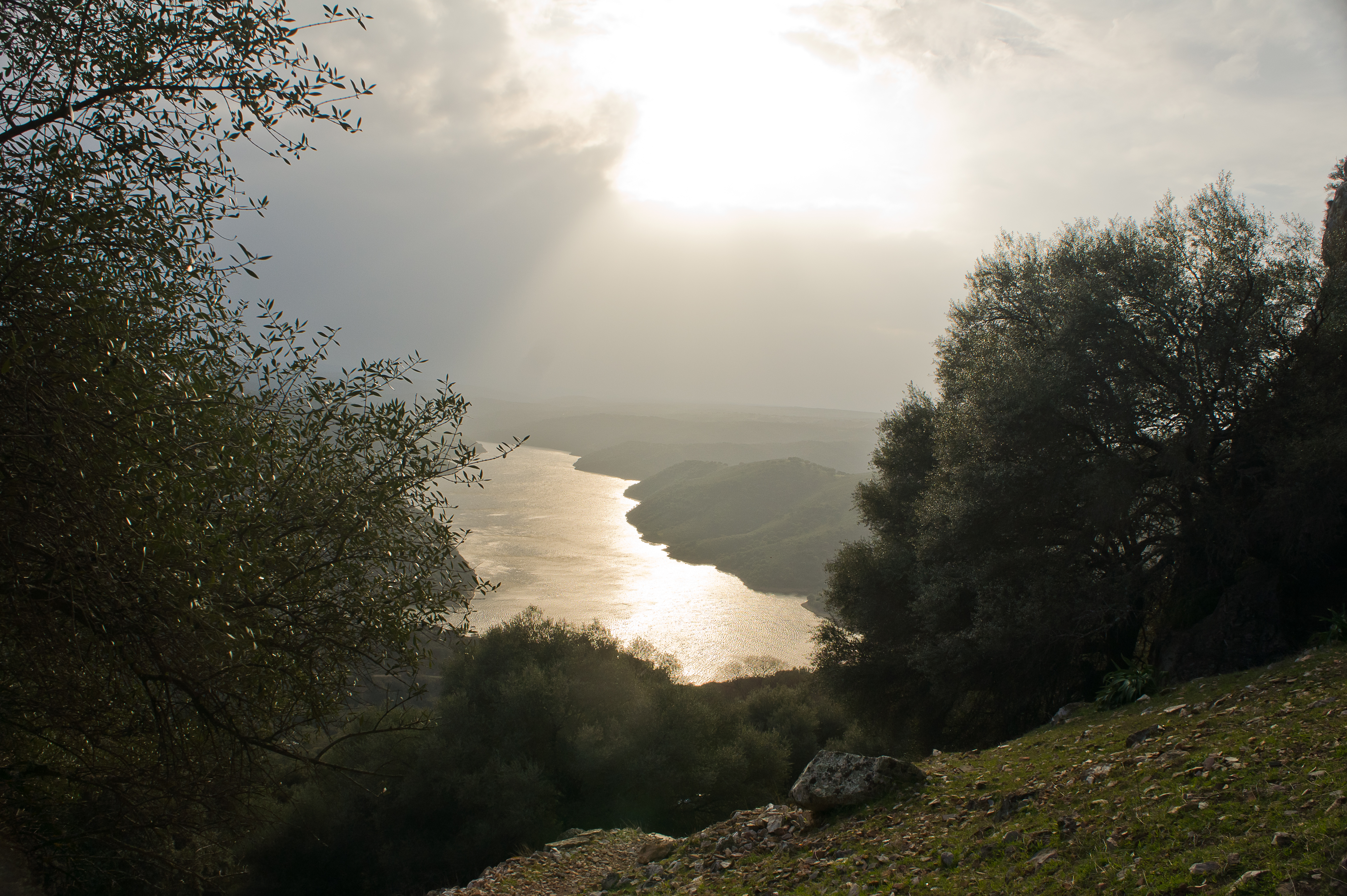
The Tagus River as it passes through the park.

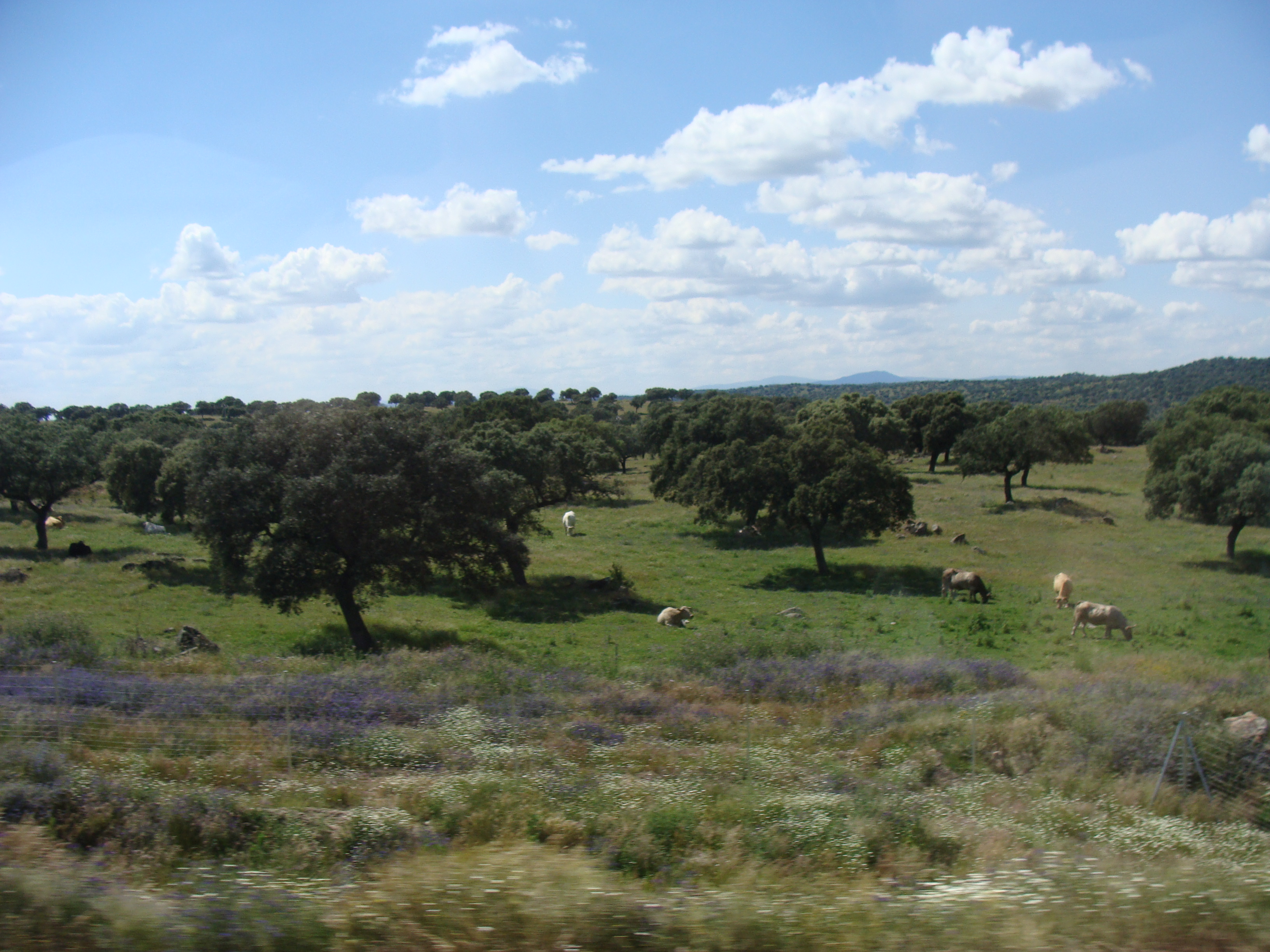
Evergreen oaks ( Quercus ilex ) in the dehesa de Monfragüe.

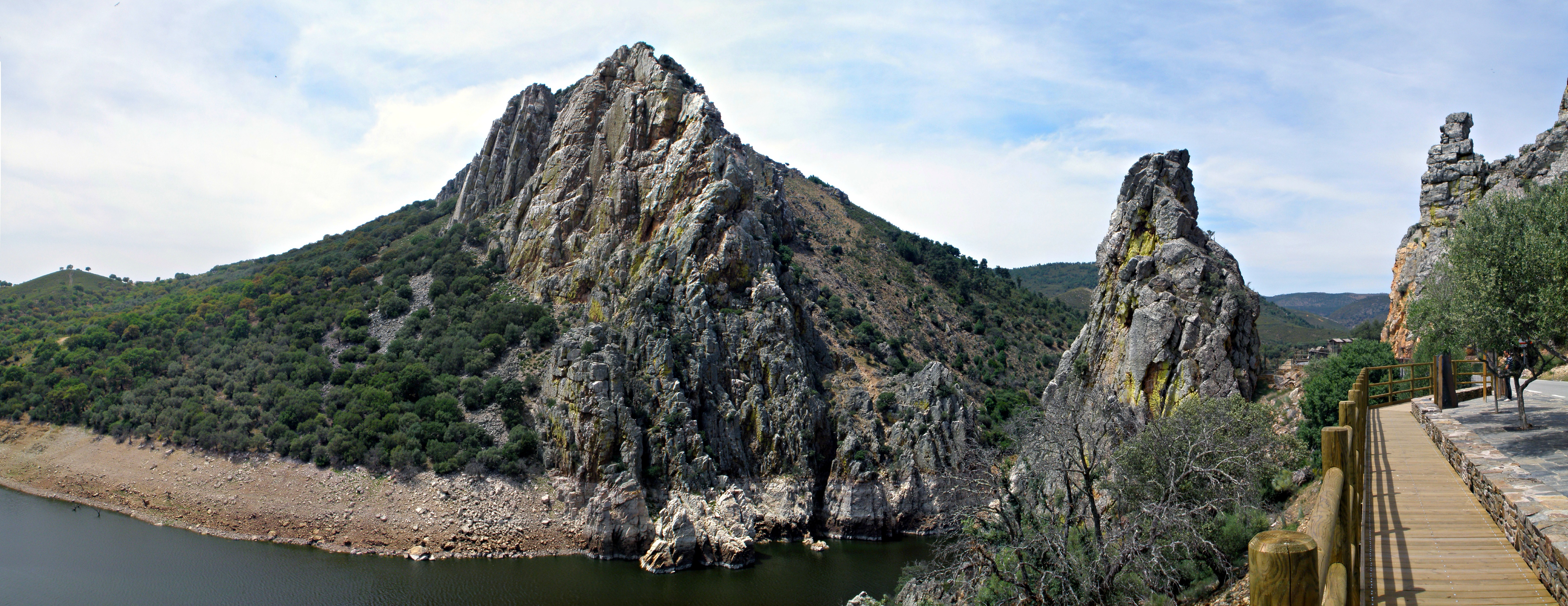
El Salto del Gitano and the lookout for birds.

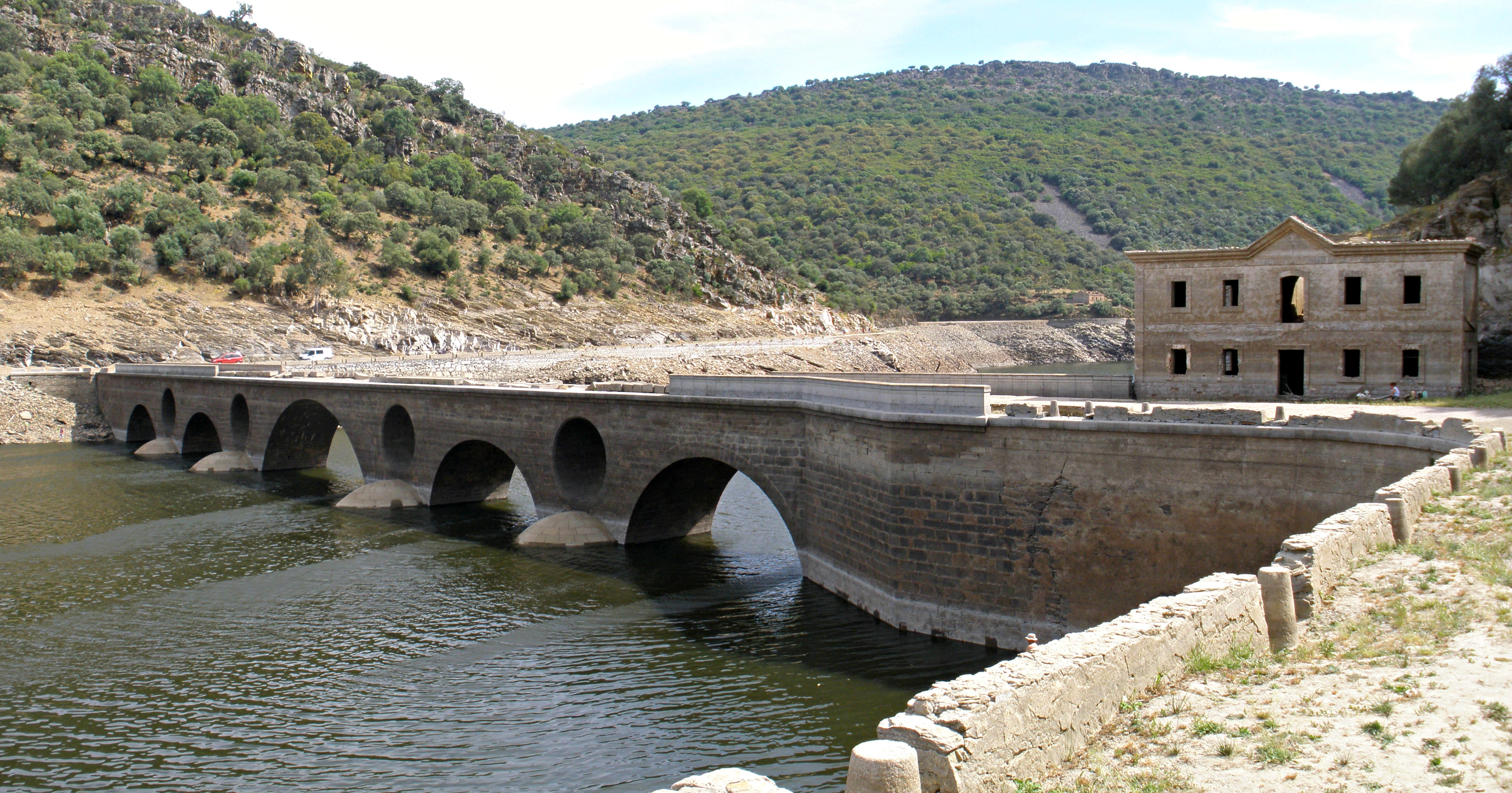
Puente del Cardenal, Monfragüe. It is only visible when the level of the Tagus River is very low.
