= List of national parks of Spain =

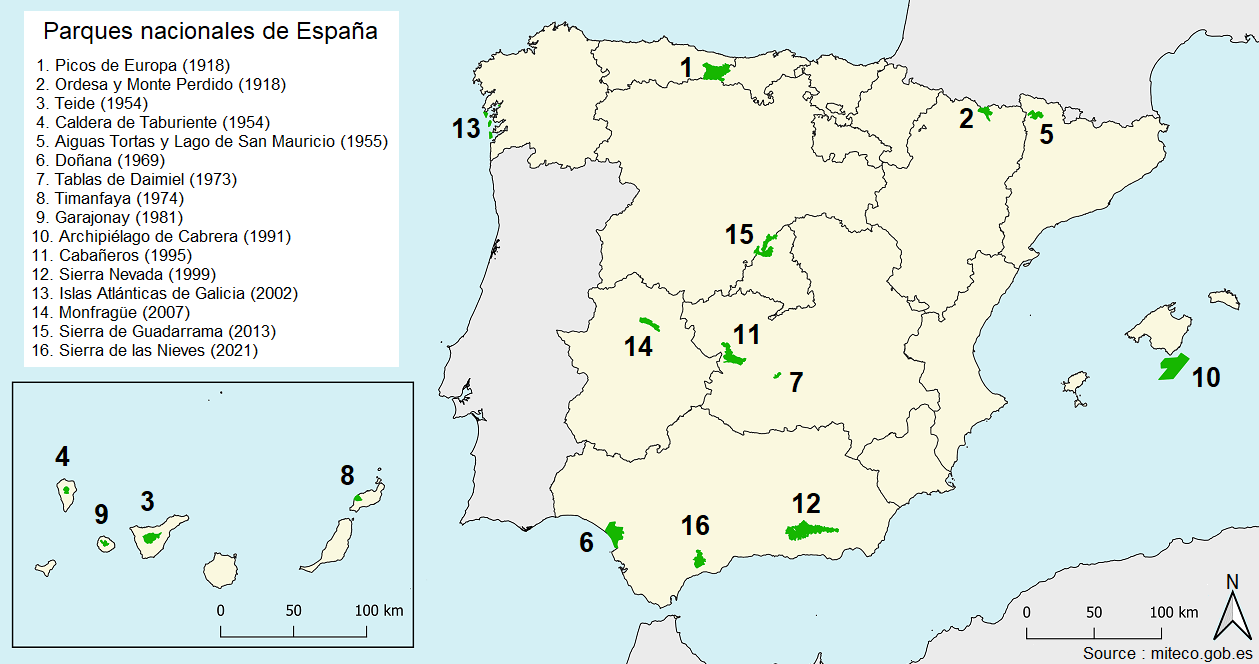
Map showing the distribution of the national parks in Spain as of 2021.

There are sixteen national parks in Spain: eleven in the Iberian Peninsula, four in the Canary Islands and one in the Balearic Islands. Twelve of the seventeen autonomous communities of Spain have national parks. Canary Islands has the most with four, followed by Andalusia with three, and Castile-La Mancha and Castile and León with two each. There are five autonomous communities that have no national parks: Basque Country, La Rioja, Murcia, Navarre, Valencian Community.

As of 2017 about 15 million people visited Spain's national parks, with Teide accounting for about 28% of all visitors. The second most visited park was Picos de Europa (17%), followed by Ordesa y Monte Perdido (13%). The least visited parks were Cabrera Archipelago (0.81%) and Cabañeros (0.72%). With more than 2.5 million visitors in 2013, Teide was the most visited national park in Europe that year, and sixth most visited in the world.

== National parks ==
Name	Photo	Province	Autonomous community	Designated	Area	Description	Ref
Aigüestortes i Estany de Sant Maurici		Lleida	Catalonia	1955	14,119 ha (34,889 acres)	Consists of two valleys (Sant Nicolau and L'Escrita) located between the rivers Noguera Pallaresa and Noguera Ribagorzana. Comaloforno is the highest mountain, with a peak at 3,033 meters (9,951 ft).	
Cabañeros		Ciudad Real and Toledo	Castile-La Mancha	1995	40,856 ha (100,957 acres)	It is the best and largest surviving area of Iberian Mediterranean forest, with an enormous variety of plant species. Part of the Montes de Toledo system of mountain ranges. Rocigalgo, at about 1,500 meters (4,900 ft), is the highest mountain in the park.	
Cabrera Archipelago		Balearic Islands	Balearic Islands	1991	90,800.52 ha (224,373 acres)	Consists of the Balearic island Cabrera, that was isolated from Mallorca during the last glacial period 12,000 years ago, and the surrounding archipelago.	
Caldera de Taburiente		Santa Cruz de Tenerife (La Palma island)	Canary Islands	1954	4,690 ha (11,589 acres)	A huge volcanic caldera covered by thick forest of Canary Island Pine and Canary Islands Juniper, being home of several endangered species and the astronomical Roque de los Muchachos Observatory.	
Doñana		Huelva and Sevilla	Andalusia	1969	54,252 ha (134,060 acres)	The park is an area of marshes, shallow streams, and sand dunes in Las Marismas, the delta where the Guadalquivir River flows into the Atlantic Ocean. It has a biodiversity that is unique in Europe, including thousands of European and African migratory birds, and endangered species such as the Spanish imperial eagle and the Iberian lynx.	
Garajonay		Santa Cruz de Tenerife (La Gomera island)	Canary Islands	1981	3,984 ha (9,845 acres)	The park provides the best example of Canarian laurisilva, a humid subtropical forest that in the Tertiary covered almost all of Southern Europe. Many of the species of flora and fauna are endemic to the Macaronesian islands, the Canary Islands or La Gomera, and the Garajonay forest harbors a rich biota of understory plants, invertebrates, and birds and bats, including a large number of endemic species.	
Guadarrama		Madrid, Segovia and Ávila	Community of Madrid and Castile and León	2013	33,960 ha (83,917 acres)	The only Iberian examples of "high Mediterranean mountain" harbouring more than 1,280 different species of plants and animals.	
Illas Atlánticas de Galicia		A Coruña and Pontevedra	Galicia	2002	8,480 ha (20,955 acres)	It comprises the archipelagos of Cíes, Ons, Sálvora and Cortegada. The park covers a land area of 1,200 ha (3,000 acres) and a sea area of 7,200 ha (18,000 acres)	
Monfragüe		Cáceres	Extremadura	2007	18,396 ha (45,458 acres)	Three main habitats predominate: Mediterranean woodland and scrubland, dehesas, rocky areas and water bodies (rivers and reservoirs). More than 200 vertebrate species breed in the park, many others hibernate or can be seen on passage during migration to other latitudes. Birds are the group of vertebrates with the greatest abundance of species and individuals.	
Ordesa y Monte Perdido		Huesca	Aragon	1918	15,608 ha (38,568 acres)	High mountain park in the transition between the Euro-Siberian and Mediterranean regions, glacial erosion formations and high biodiversity.	
Picos de Europa		Asturias, León and Cantabria	Asturias, Castile-Leon and Cantabria	1918	67,127 ha (165,874 acres)	Covers the mountain range Picos de Europa (part of the Cantabrian Mountains) and consists of three massifs: Central, Western and Eastern. Torre de Cerredo, at 2,646 meters (8,681 ft), is the highest mountain.	
Sierra Nevada		Granada, Almería, and Málaga	Andalusia	1999	85,883 ha (212,222 acres)	The park has fifteen peaks over 3,000 meters (9,800 ft) altitude, including Mulhacén, the highest mountain in the Iberian Peninsula, with a peak of 3,482 meters (11,424 ft).	
Sierra de las Nieves		Malaga	Andalusia	2021	22,979.76 ha	The true hallmark of this territory are the Spanish fir forests, a botanical relic of the Tertiary conifer forests, endemic to the mountain ranges of Malaga and Cadiz, and which have in this protected natural area their largest area of distribution in the world with nearly 2,000 hectares.	
Tablas de Daimiel		Ciudad Real	Castile-La Mancha	1973	3,030 ha (7,487 acres)	The park is the last surviving example of floodplain wetlands located in the arid central part of the Iberian peninsula.	
Teide		Santa Cruz de Tenerife (Tenerife island)	Canary Islands	1954	18,990 ha (46,925 acres)	Atop the highest mountain of Spain, this national park, also a UNESCO world heritage site, features volcanic mountains, various plant species including the fragile species such as the Canary Island cedar and the Canary Island pine, and a few birds and animals.	
Timanfaya		Las Palmas (Lanzarote island)	Canary Islands	1974	5,107 ha (12,620 acres)	The only National Park in Spain which is entirely geological, representing recent and historical volcanism in the Macaronesian Region. The last volcanic eruptions occurred in the 18th and 19th centuries.	

== See also ==
- Ministry of Environment (Spain)
- Natural park (Spain)
- Àrea natural d'especial interès — protected areas in the Balearic Islands
