= Cabrera Archipelago Maritime-Terrestrial National Park =

National park in the Balearic Islands, Spain

Native name: Parc Nacional Maritimoterrestre de l’Arxipèlag de Cabrera (Catalan) Parque nacional marítimo-terrestre del Archipiélago de Cabrera (Spanish)
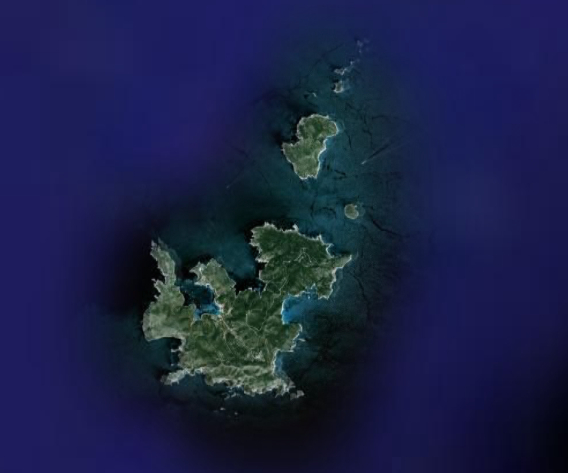
- Location of Cabrera Archipelago

Geography
- Location: Mediterranean Sea
- Coordinates: 39°09′N 2°57′E
- Archipelago: Balearic Islands
- Total islands: 11
- Major islands: — Estells de Fora; — S'Imperial; — Cabrera; — Ses bledes; — Na Redona; — Conillera; — S'Esponja; — Na Plana; — Illot Pla; — Na Pobra; — Na Foradada
- Area: 908 km^{2} (351 sq mi)
- Highest elevation: 172 m (564 ft)
- Highest point: Na Picamosques

Administration
- Spain
- Autonomous Community: Balearic Islands
- Province: Balearic Islands

Demographics
- Pop. density: 0/km^{2} (0/sq mi)

The Cabrera Archipelago Maritime-Terrestrial National Park (Catalan: Parc Nacional Maritimoterrestre de l'Arxipèlag de Cabrera, Spanish: Parque nacional marítimo-terrestre del Archipiélago de Cabrera) is a national park that includes the whole of the Cabrera Archipelago in the Balearic Islands (Catalan: Illes Balears, Spanish: Islas Baleares), an autonomous community that is part of Spain. The park is the largest in Spain, covering 908 square kilometres (351 sq mi) including 895 square kilometres (346 sq mi) of sea area. The park attracts relatively few visitors due to its remoteness. There is no permanent population, but there might be at any given time just under 100 National Park staff members and other personnel on the islands.

The archipelago has great natural value. Due to its isolation throughout history, it has remained relatively unchanged. The coastal landscape of Cabrera is often considered one of the best preserved on the Spanish coast, and indeed in all of the Mediterranean, as a result. The islands are blanketed by important colonies of seabirds and other endemic species. Due to its biotic wealth and abundance and variety of birds, the park has also been declared a Special Protection Area (SPA) for birds. It is also a Site of Community Importance (SIC), and as such is integrated into the Natura 2000 network. The park is likewise among the ranks of the Specially Protected Areas of Mediterranean Importance (SPAMI) under the protocols for protected marine areas established by the Barcelona Convention.

Administratively, the islands belong to the municipality of Palma de Mallorca despite their distance.

== History ==
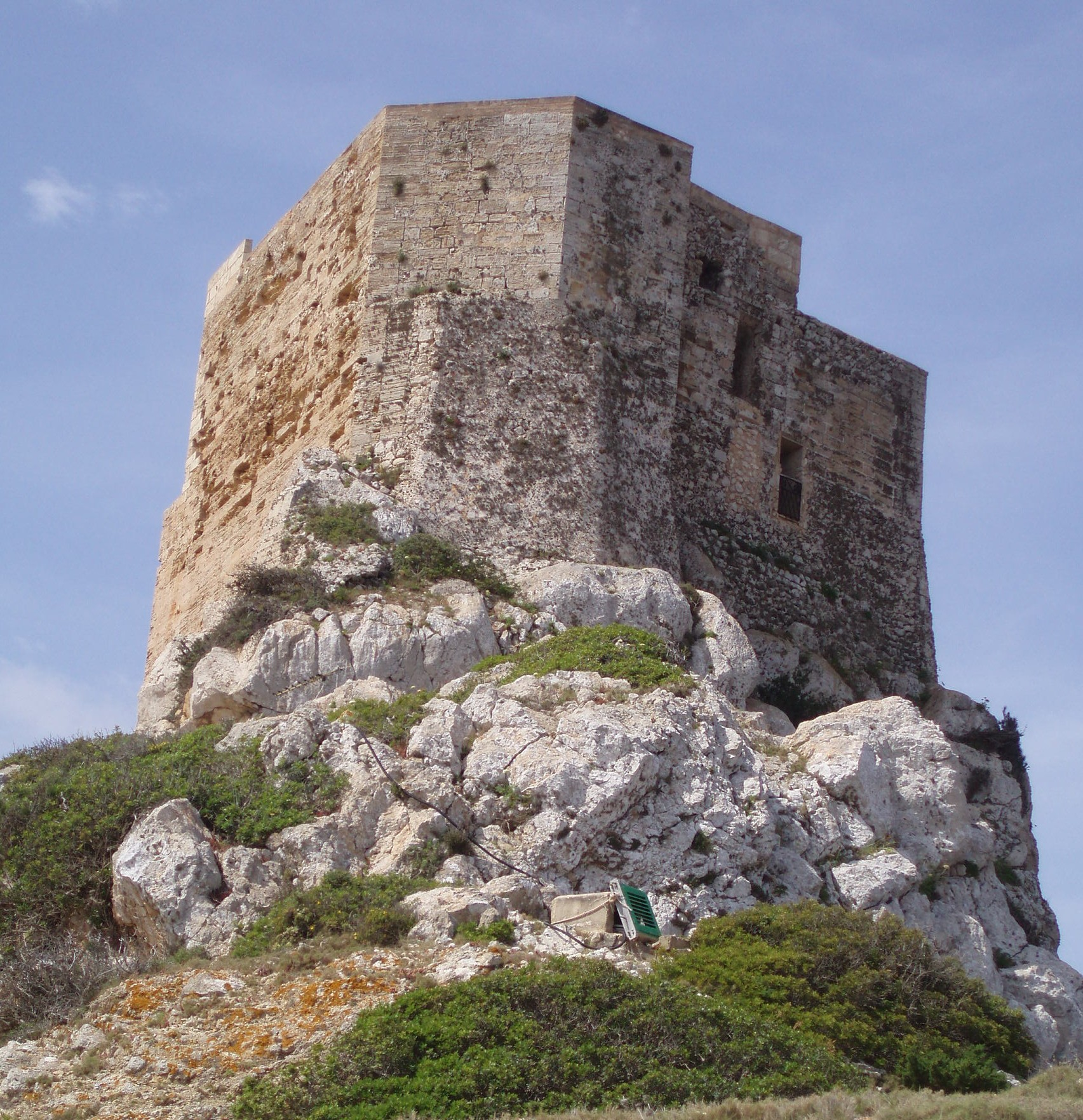
The Cabrera Castle dates from the 14th century

Extension in 2019.

Use of the islands by the Spanish Armed Forces from 1973 to 1986 served as an obstacle to achieving protection for the archipelago. In 1988, the Parliament of the Balearic Islands unanimously passed a resolution then sent to the Spanish Parliament "for the creation of the Cabrera Archipelago Maritime-Terrestrial National Park," which was later enacted into law on April 29, 1991. The park, in addition to the law, is governed by the "Master Plan for Use and Management of the Cabrera Archipelago Maritime-Terrestrial National Park" approved by means of Order 58/2006 on July 1, 2006, by the Government of the Balearic Islands for a six-year period.

Limited military use of the area continues all the same.

== Visiting ==
Cabrera Archipelago National Park is a restricted cruising destination, and boats may not anchor in the island's natural harbour, but must use laid moorings which have to be booked in advance. Access ashore by dinghy. Many species survive on Cabrera that are rare in other parts of the Balearics, such as sea snails and the very unusual black lizard.

Surrounding water of Balearic Sea is rich in biodiversity. Various types of cetaceans such as sperm, pilot, dolphins, and fin whales are regular and others such as humpback and orca on occasions, and loggerhead turtles can be found.

Diving is strictly limited and a license allows for a one-day visit only. Excursions to the island are a rare event and are treasured by the diving community. Hiking possibilities are abundant generally on organised tours, although both the castle and the lighthouse can be accessed unsupervised. There is a small visitors centre, a 14th-century castle and a museum, as well as a gift shop and bar.

== See also ==
- Cabrera, Balearic Islands
- List of Spanish national parks

== Bibliography ==
- Moreno, Jorge; Ballesteros, Enrique; Amengual Ramis, José. Arxipièlag de Cabrera: parc nacional. Barcelona: Lunwerg Editores, 2001, ISBN 84-7782-798-2. (in Catalan and English)
