= Guadyerbas =

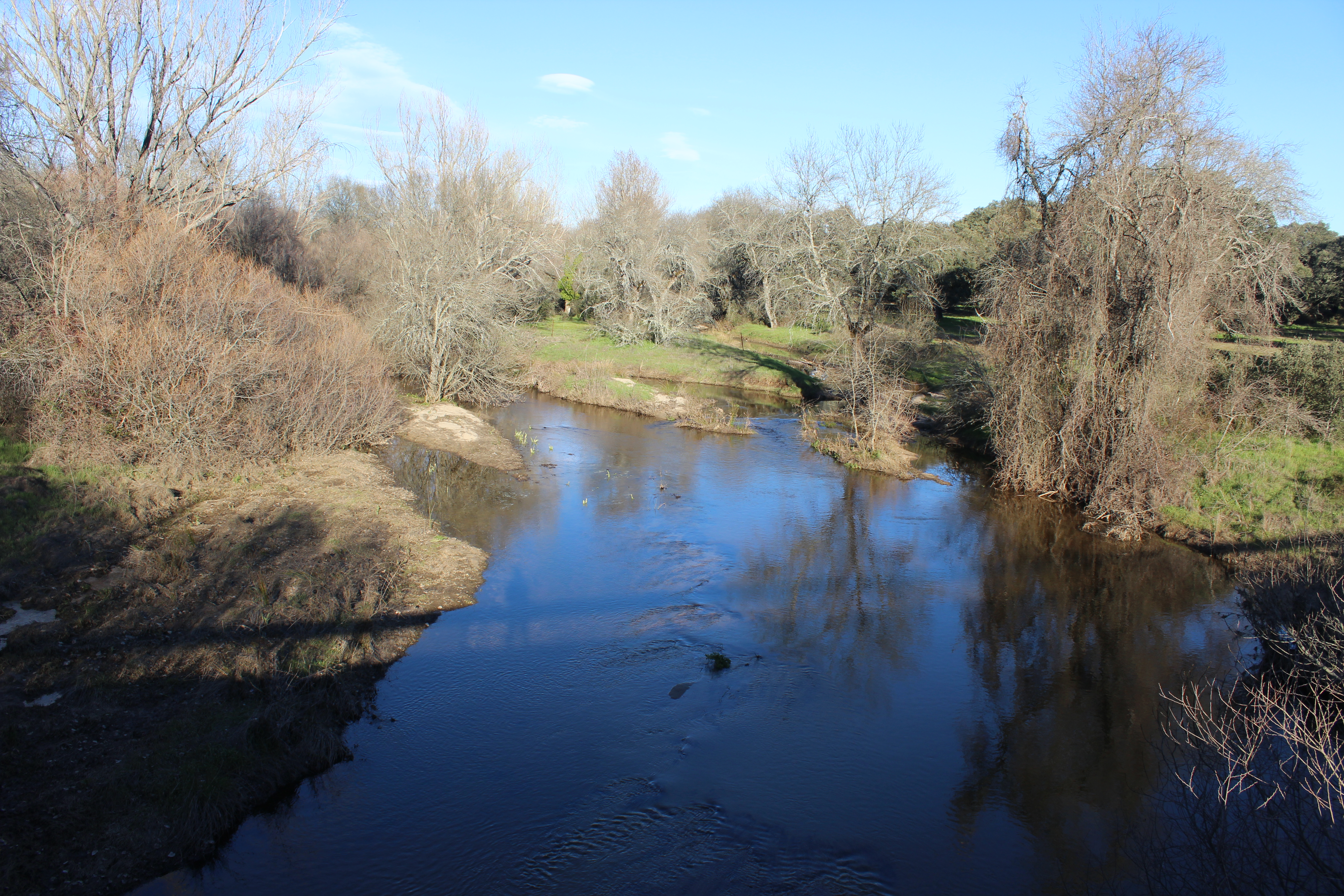

Location
- Country: Spain

Physical characteristics
- Source: Sierra de San Vicente
  - location: Navamorcuende
  - coordinates: 40°8′52″N 4°44′37″W
  - elevation: ~1,200 m (3,900 ft)
- Mouth: Tiétar
  - location: Oropesa
  - coordinates: 40°5′1″N 5°11′31″W
- Length: 45 km (28 mi)

Basin features
- River system: Tagus

The Guadyerbas is a river of Spain located in the centre of the Iberian Peninsula. It is the main left-bank tributary of the Tiétar, in turn a major tributary of the Tagus.

It has its source in the western reaches of the Sierra de San Vicente, at the feet of the Pico Cruces, at roughly 1,200 m above sea level. Featuring a total length of 45 km, it flows westwards through the northwest of the province of Toledo, emptying in the Tiétar a few kilometres upstream from the Rosarito Reservoir, in Oropesa.

Its waters are retained by the Navalcán Reservoir. The toponym is formed by the Arabic wadi (river) and the Spanish hierba/yerba (grass).
