= Rozas de Puerto Real =

- Municipality
- Flag Coat of arms

- Municipal location within the Community of Madrid.

- Location in Spain Rozas de Puerto Real (Spain)
- Coordinates: 40°18′33″N 4°29′29″W
- Country: Spain
- Autonomous community: Community of Madrid

Population (2025-01-01)
  - Total: 579
- Time zone: UTC+1 (CET)
  - Summer (DST): UTC+2 (CEST)

Rozas de Puerto Real is a municipality of the Community of Madrid, Spain.
