= Lanzahíta =

- municipality
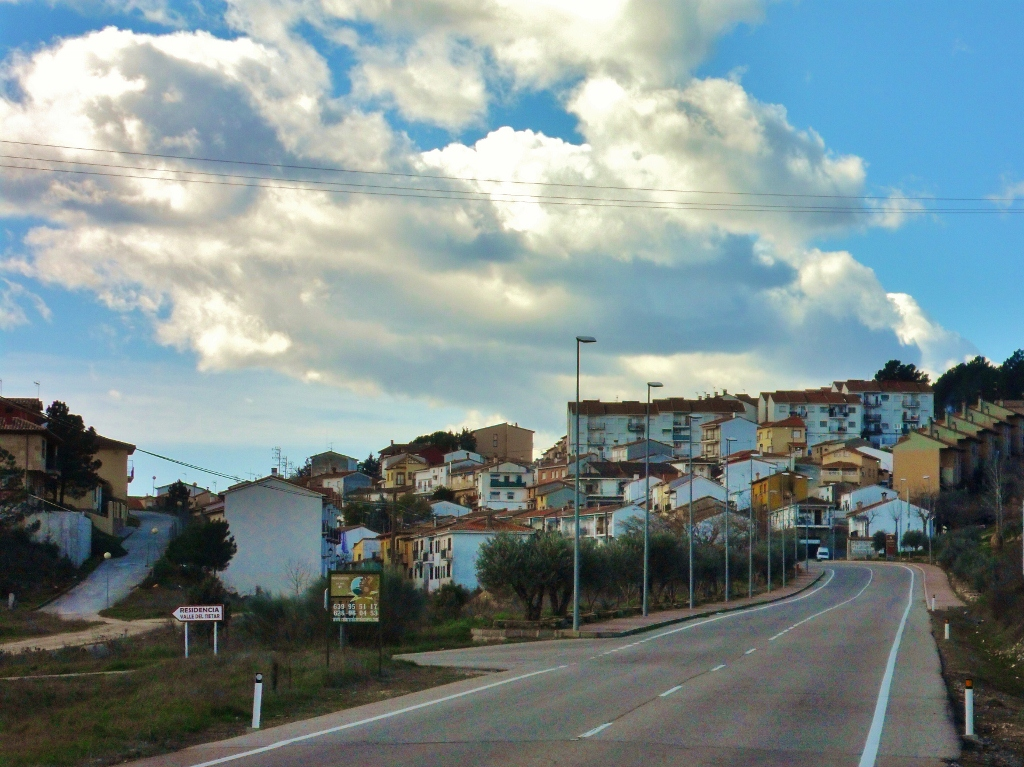
- View of Lanzahíta town.

- Flag Coat of arms

- Location in Spain. Lanzahíta (Castile and León)
- Coordinates: 40°12′14″N 4°56′14″W
- Country: Spain
- Autonomous community: Castile and León
- Province: Ávila
- Municipality: Lanzahíta

Area
  - Total: 33.67 km^{2} (13.00 sq mi)
- Elevation: 448 m (1,470 ft)

Population (2025-01-01)
  - Total: 771
  - Density: 22.9/km^{2} (59.3/sq mi)
- Time zone: UTC+1 (CET)
  - Summer (DST): UTC+2 (CEST)
- Website: Official website

Lanzahíta is a municipality located in the province of Ávila, Castile and León, Spain.

== Population ==
Historical population
Year	Pop.	±% p.a.
2023	799	—
2024	788	−1.38%
2025	771	−2.16%
Source: INE
