= Torrejón el Rubio =

Coordinates: 39°46′N 6°01′W

Torrejón el Rubio, Spain
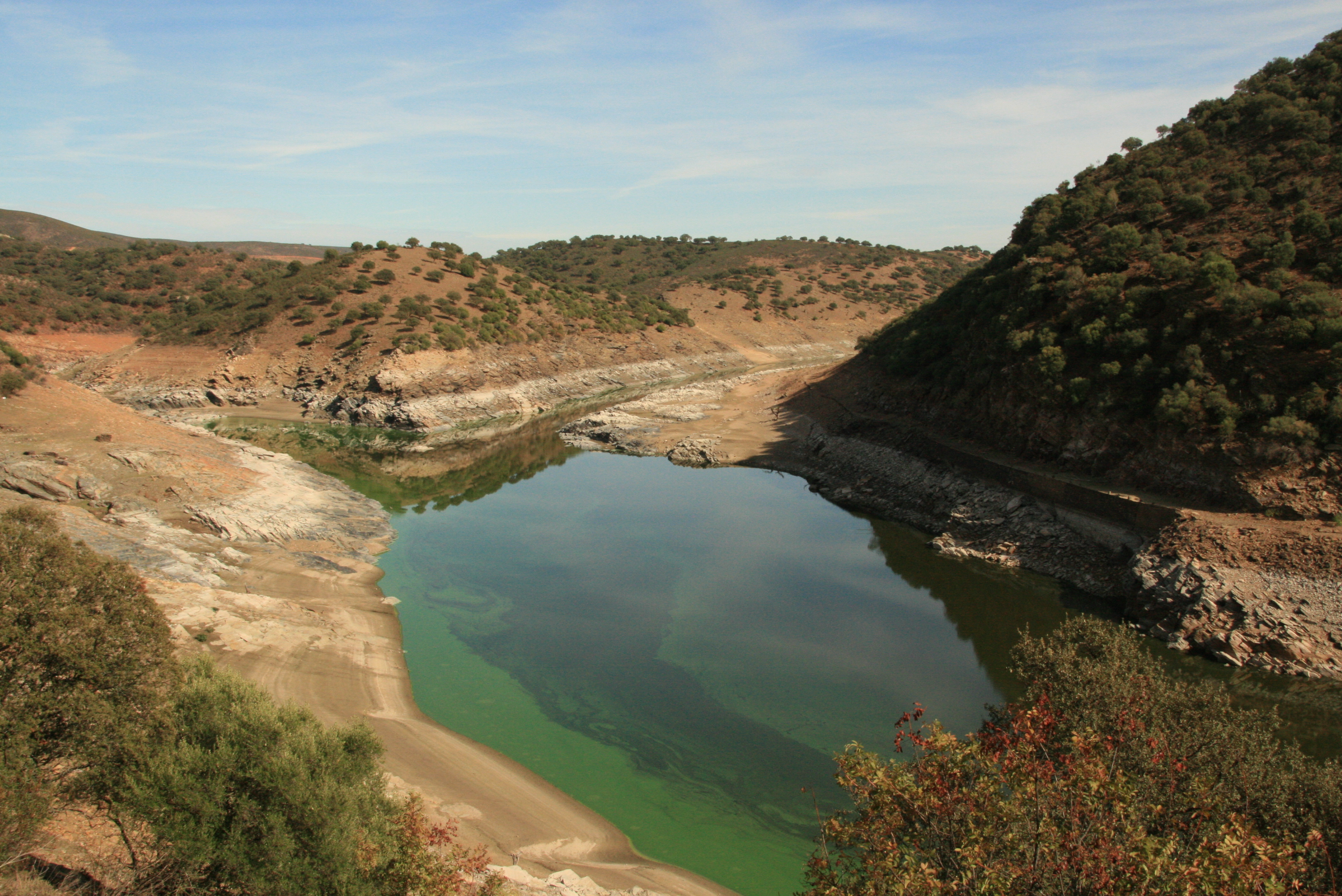

- Flag Coat of arms
- Interactive map of Torrejón el Rubio, Spain
- Country: Spain
- Autonomous community: Extremadura
- Province: Cáceres
- Municipality: Torrejón el Rubio

Area
  - Total: 221 km^{2} (85 sq mi)

Population (2025-01-01)
  - Total: 537
  - Density: 2.43/km^{2} (6.29/sq mi)
- Time zone: UTC+1 (CET)
  - Summer (DST): UTC+2 (CEST)

Torrejón el Rubio is a municipality located in the province of Cáceres, Extremadura, Spain. According to the 2006 census (INE), the municipality has a population of 613 inhabitants.

== See also ==
- List of municipalities in Cáceres
