= La Adrada =

- municipality
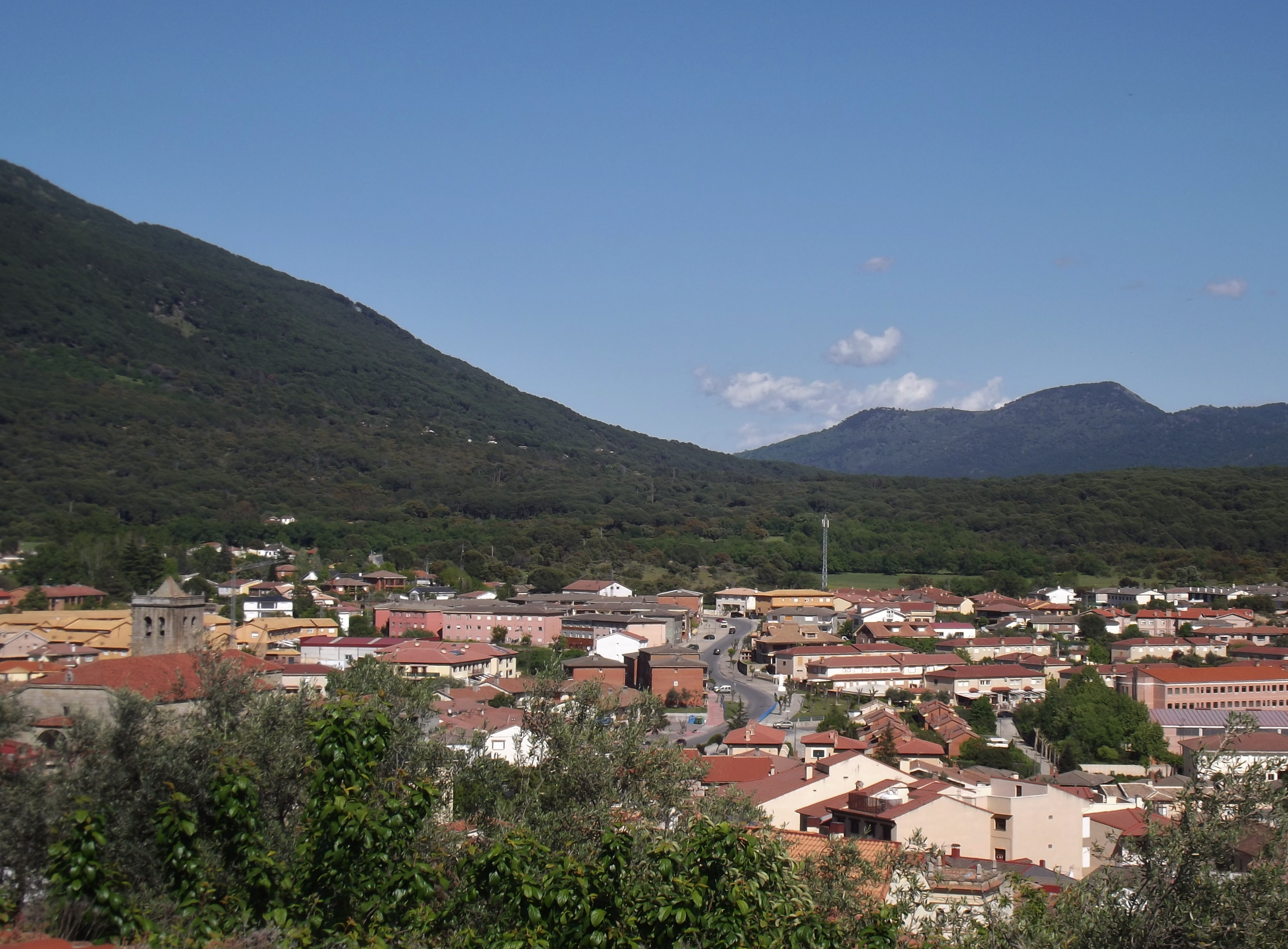

- Coat of arms

- Location in Spain. La Adrada (Castile and León)
- Coordinates: 40°17′57″N 4°38′06″W
- Country: Spain
- Autonomous community: Castile and León
- Province: Ávila

Area
  - Total: 58.67 km^{2} (22.65 sq mi)
- Elevation: 624 m (2,047 ft)

Population (2025-01-01)
  - Total: 2,853
  - Density: 48.63/km^{2} (125.9/sq mi)
- Time zone: UTC+1 (CET)
  - Summer (DST): UTC+2 (CEST)
- Website: Official website

La Adrada is a municipality located in the province of Ávila, Castile and León, Spain.

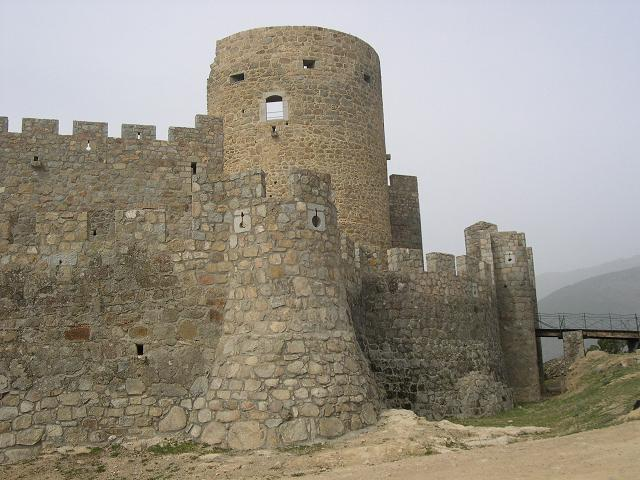
Don Álvaro de Luna Castle, built in the 14th century.

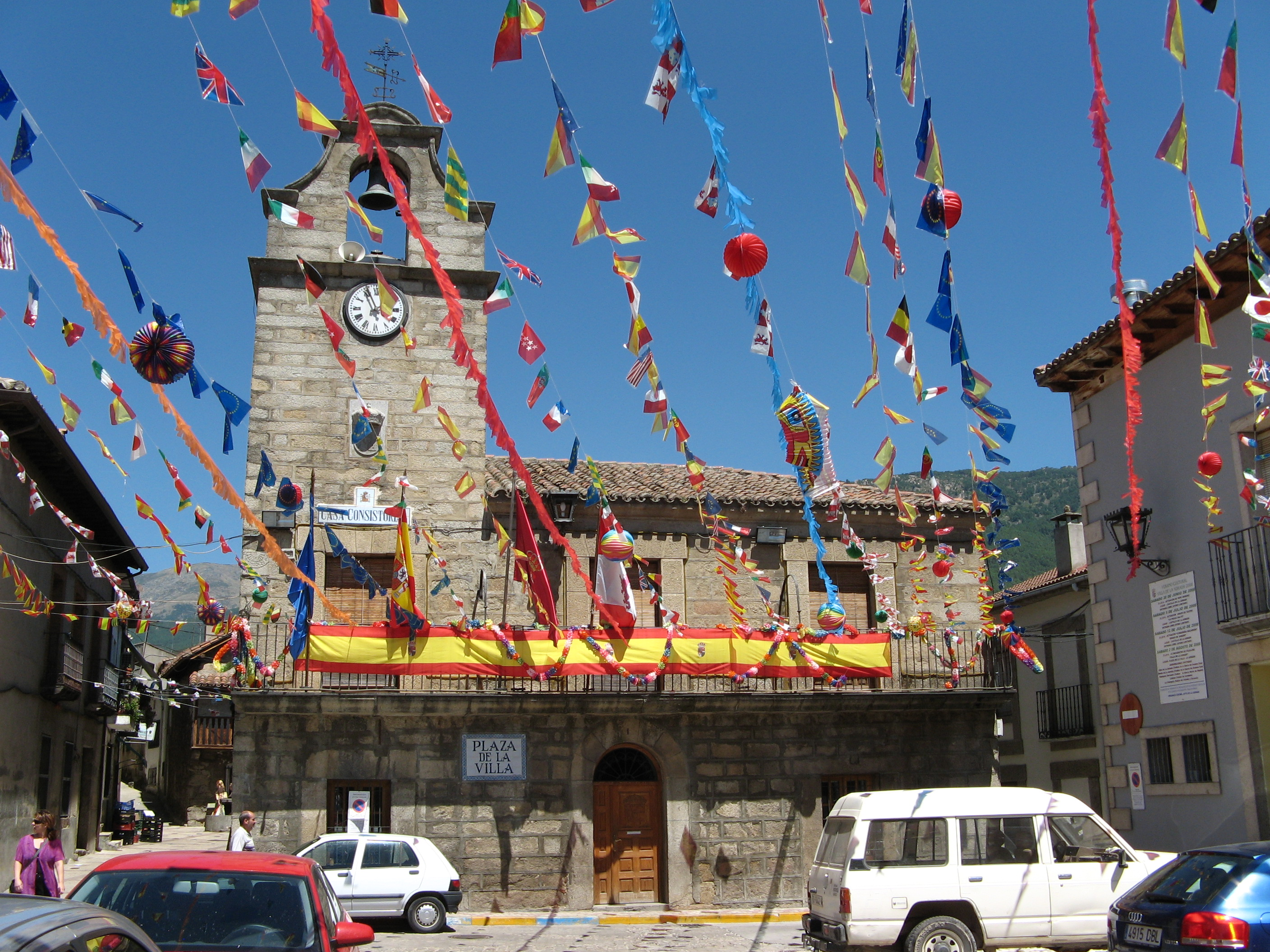
Consistorial house of La Adrada

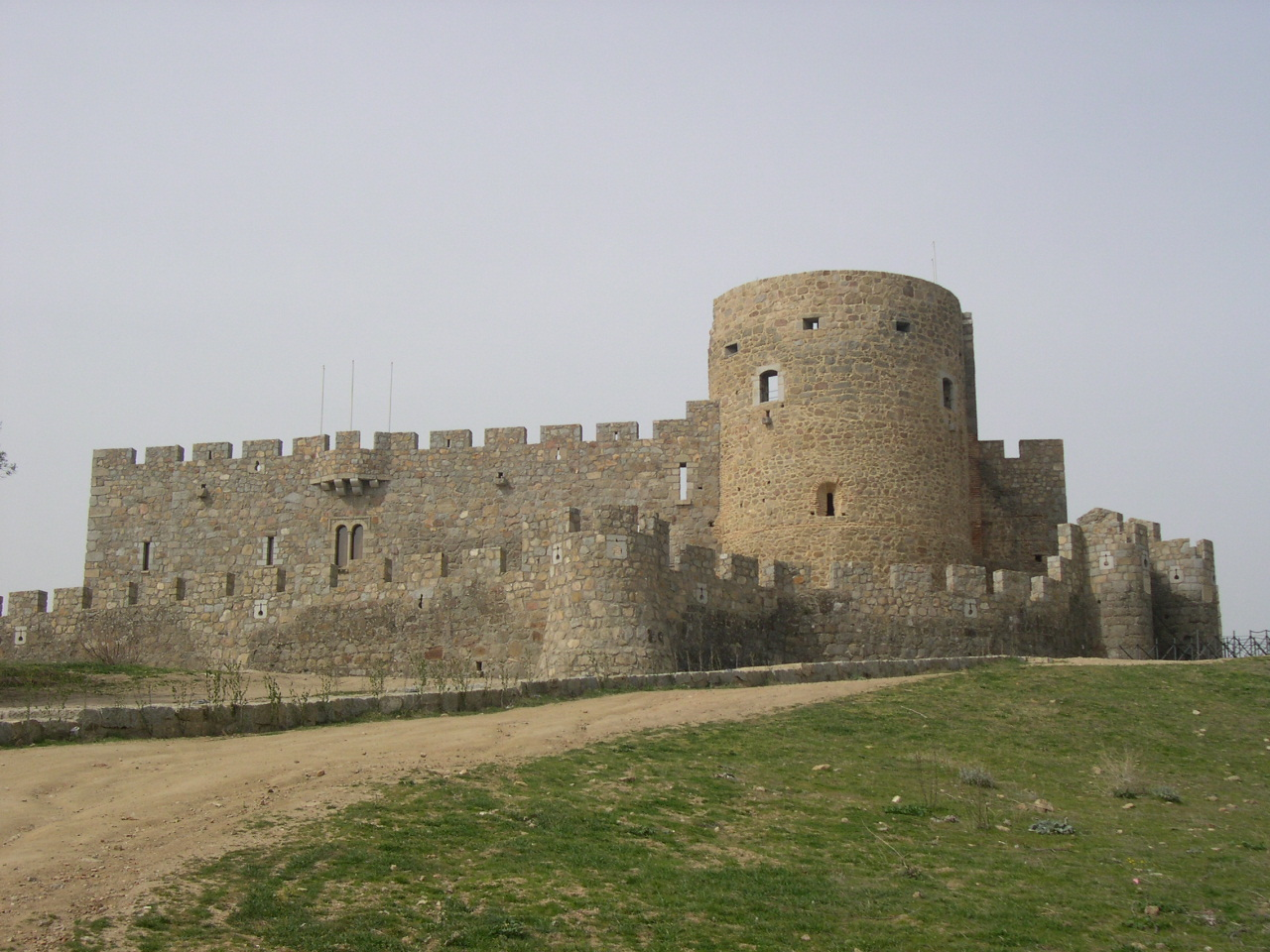
La Adrada

== Population ==
Historical population
Year	Pop.	±% p.a.
2023	2,727	—
2024	2,796	+2.53%
2025	2,853	+2.04%
Source: INE
