= Cabrera, Balearic Islands =

Island in Balearic Islands, Spain

Cabrera
- Island
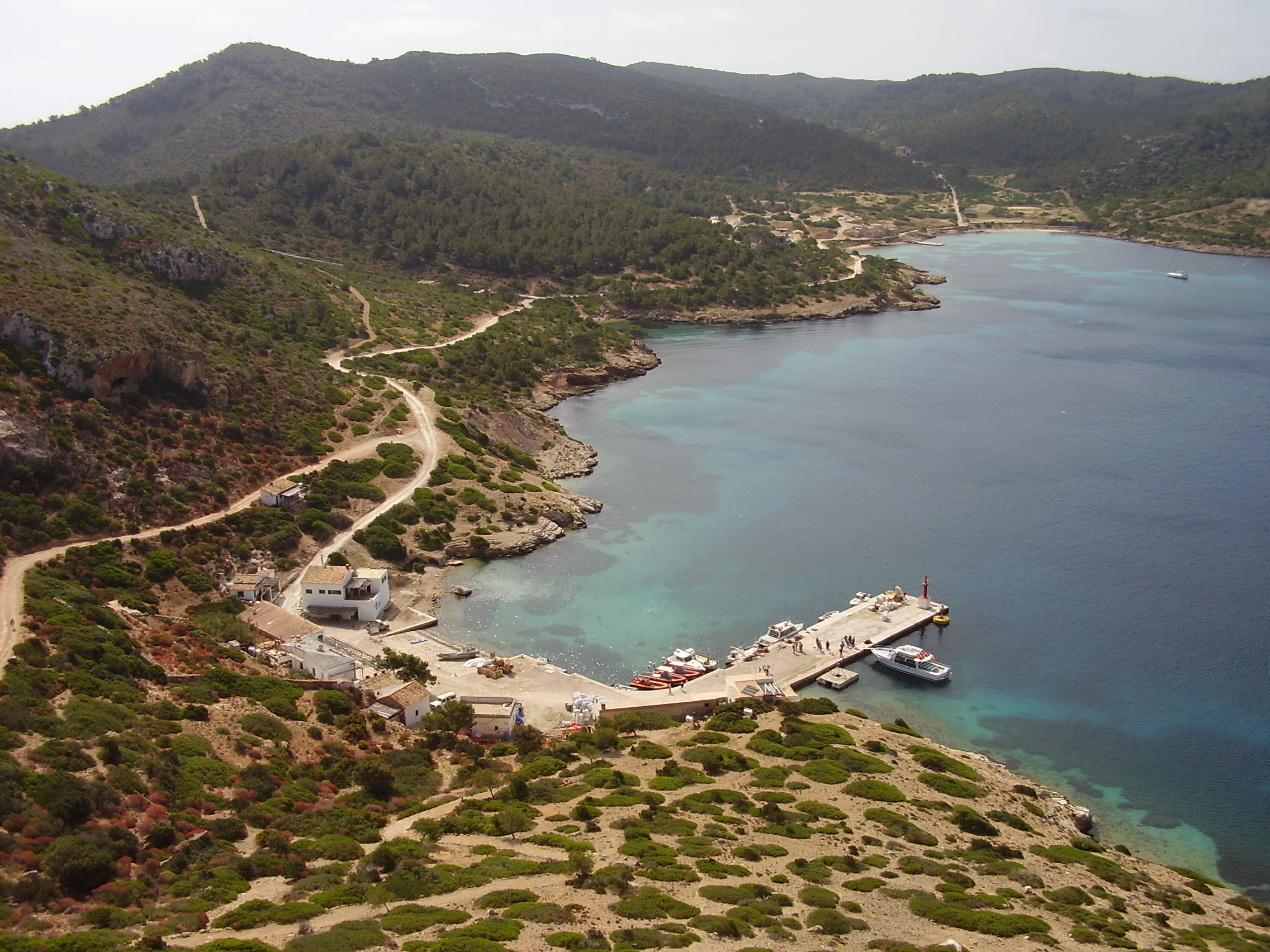
- Cabrera Island harbour

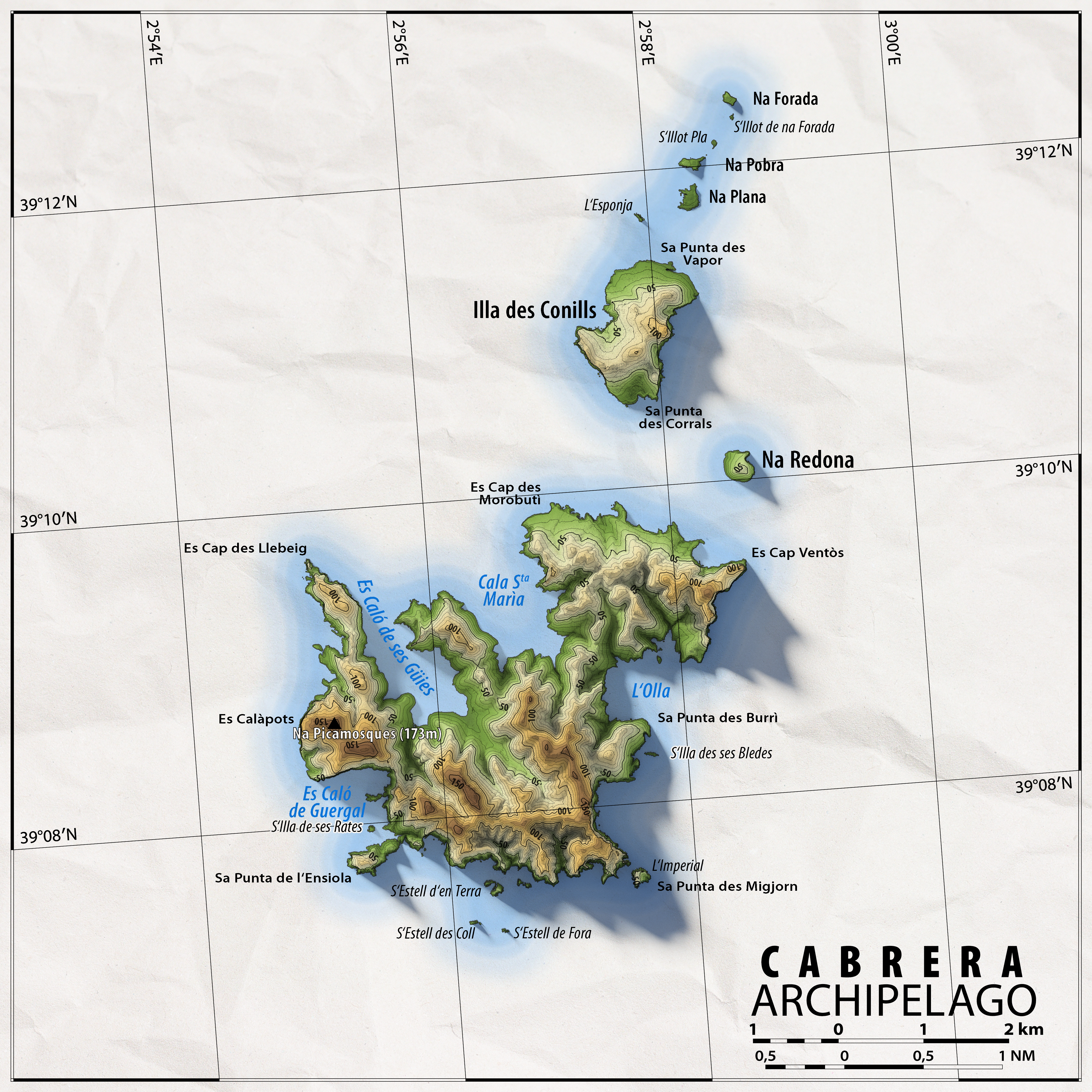
- Topographic map of Cabrera Archipelago

- Location in Spain Cabrera (Spain)
- Coordinates: 39°08′30″N 2°56′45″E
- Country: Spain
- Autonomous community: Balearic Islands
- Government: Consell de Mallorca
- Municipality: Palma de Mallorca

Area
  - Total: 15.69 km^{2} (6.06 sq mi)
- Highest elevation: 172 m (564 ft)

Population (2009)
  - Total: 20
- Time zone: UTC+1 (CET)
  - Summer (DST): UTC+2 (CEST)

Cabrera (Balearic Catalan: [kəˈbɾeɾə], Spanish: [kaˈβɾeɾa], Latin: Capraria) is an island in the Balearic Islands, Spain located in the Mediterranean Sea off the southern coast of Mallorca. A National Park, its highest point is Na Picamosques (172 m). Uninhabited, it is administratively part of the city of Palma in Mallorca.

Cabrera is the largest island of the small archipelago that includes (from south to north) the islands of Estells de Fora, L'Imperial, Illa de ses Bledes, Na Redona, Conillera, L'Esponja, Na Plana, Illot Pla, Na Pobra and Na Foradada.

== History ==
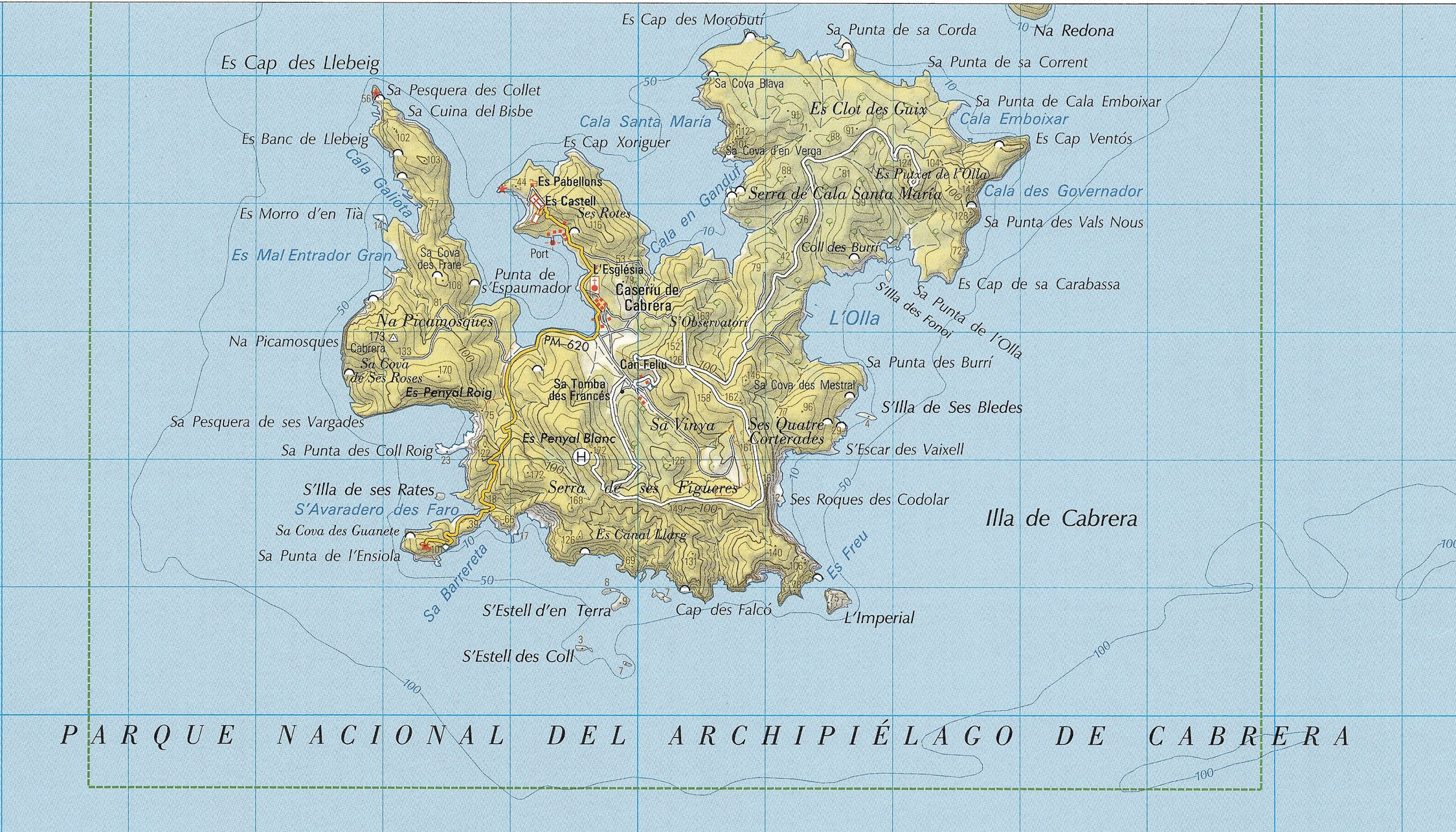
Map of Cabrera in 2003

In December 1530, Hayreddin Barbarossa, an Ottoman admiral of the fleet, captured the Castle of Cabrera, and started to use the island as a logistic base for his operations in the area. Barbarossa's naval victories secured Ottoman dominance over the Mediterranean during the mid-16th century, from 1530 until the Battle of Lepanto in 1571.

Cabrera was used to house French prisoners of war following the 1808 Battle of Bailén. Of the 9,000 sent to Cabrera during the war, only 3,600 remained to be repatriated at its end in 1814, though 876 officers and sergeants were taken off in July 1810 and sailed to England. The island was to be supplied every two days with food and water but these ships often did not set sail. As well as dying of starvation, thirst and disease many were driven insane and some became cannibalistic. Inscriptions by the prisoners have been discovered in a cave at Cap Ventos, in the northwest of the island, an area still littered with buttons from their disintegrated uniforms.

Late in 1916, a malfunctioning Austro-Hungarian Navy submarine remained at Cabrera for several hours, and the Spanish government subsequently decided to expropriate the island for defense. It is alleged that Juan March Ordinas, avoiding the blockade, had been selling supplies, including fuel, to submarine personnel, from the area of Cala Ganduf and S'Olla. There was strong international protest, particularly by the British Admiralty, as Spain was officially neutral during the First World War.

Cabrera remained a military zone until the 1980s, although from the 1920s some Mallorcan civilians rented out their Cabrera land for agriculture.

In 1936, during the Spanish Civil War, a Republican Air Force Dornier Wal D-1 airplane crashed near the island. The crew were captured by military nationalist forces, but two Republican submarines (a B2 and B3) sent by order of Pedro Marqués Barber (an old NCO and former military Menorca self-proclaimed governor) came immediately and the small Cabreran force surrendered. Facundo Flores Horrach (the chief military officer), Mariano Ferrer Bravo (a retired Spanish officer) and three civilians (males of the Suñer Mas family) were taken to Menorca and executed in a harbour place named S'Hort d'en Morillo (Mahón). After the failure of Captain Alberto Bayo Column landing in Mallorca, from 15 August to 4 September, the Republican troops left Cabrera. Bayo's plan was for the CNT column, stationed in Cabrera, to appear at Dragonera Island just southwest of Mallorca and simulate a false landing. But the anarchist CNT command refused this tactic and later went to Mallorca. A bloody battle destroyed them in Porto Cristo. The rest of this column failed before it arrived and was killed on Sa Cabana, just outside their point of entry at Manacor.

Cabrera, which had been a former Santa Catalina, Palma de Mallorca district, was declared a National Park in April 1991. The Cabrera National Park is now administratively grouped with the municipality of Palma de Mallorca.

== See also ==
- Cabrera National Park
