= Santa María del Tiétar =

- municipality
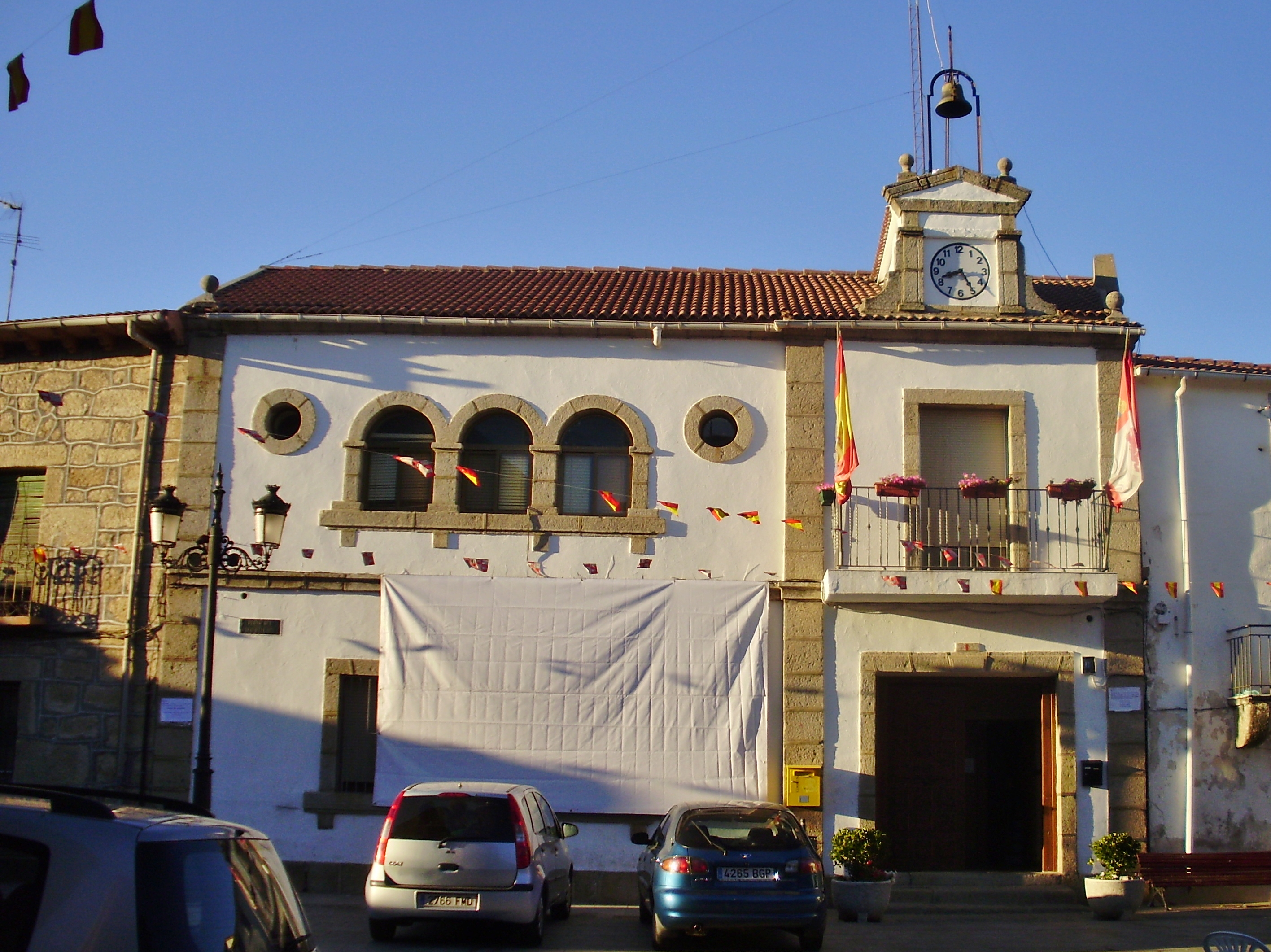
- Town Hall of Santa María del Tiétar

- Flag Coat of arms

- Location in Spain. Santa María del Tiétar (Spain)
- Coordinates: 40°18′15″N 4°33′15″W
- Country: Spain
- Autonomous community: Castile and León
- Province: Ávila
- Municipality: Santa María del Tiétar

Area
  - Total: 12 km^{2} (4.6 sq mi)

Population (2025-01-01)
  - Total: 582
  - Density: 49/km^{2} (130/sq mi)
- Time zone: UTC+1 (CET)
  - Summer (DST): UTC+2 (CEST)
- Website: Official website

Santa María del Tiétar is a municipality located in the province of Ávila, Castile and León, Spain.

== Population ==
Historical population
Year	Pop.	±% p.a.
2023	533	—
2024	533	+0.00%
2025	582	+9.19%
Source: INE
