= Outline of Spain =

Country in Europe with territories in North Africa

The Flag of Spain

The Coat of arms of Spain

The location of Spain in Europe

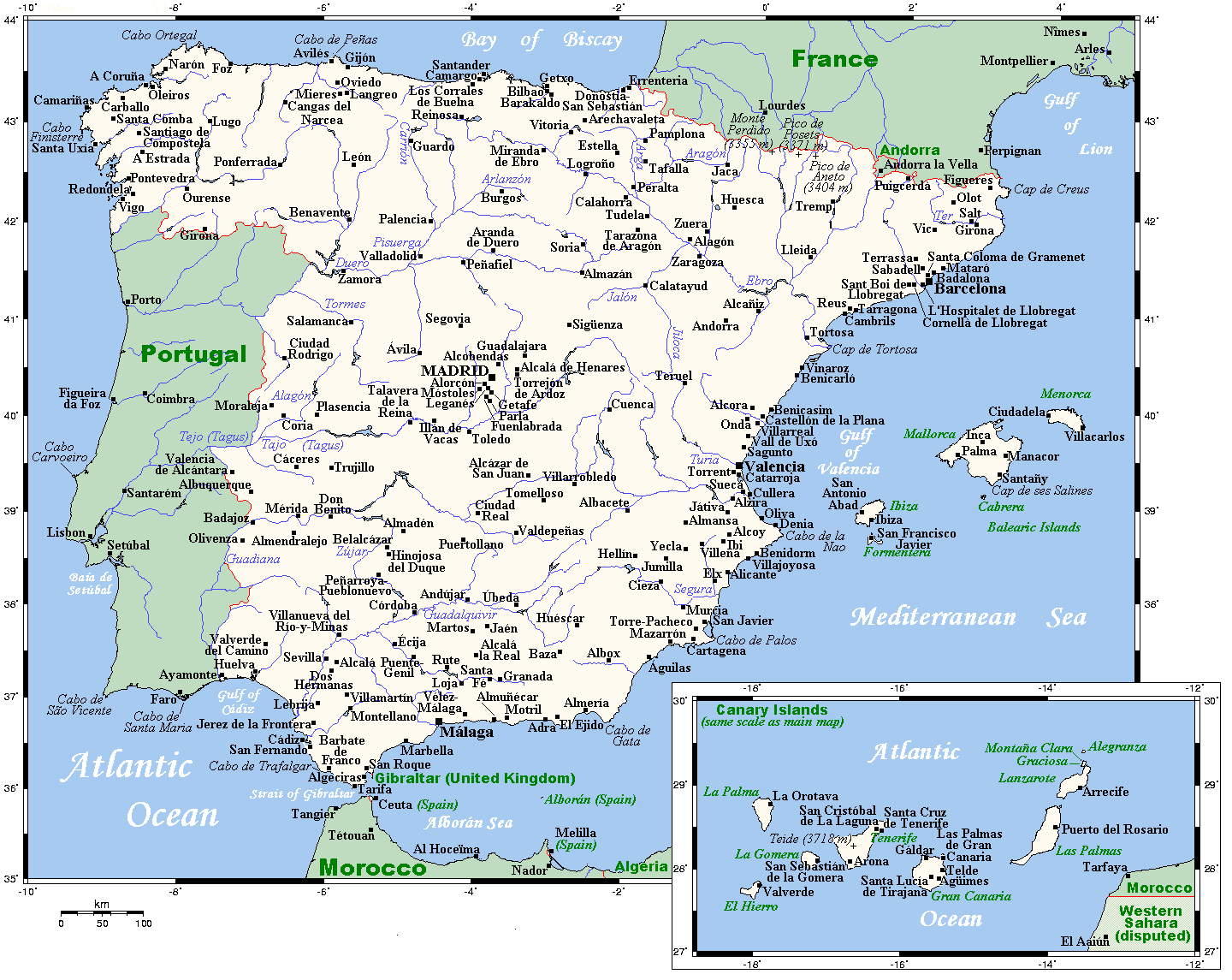
A hydrographic map of Spain

The following outline provides an overview of and topical guide to Spain.

Spain, officially the Kingdom of Spain, is a country in Southern and Western Europe with territories in North Africa. Featuring the southernmost point of continental Europe, it is the largest country in Southern Europe and the fourth-most populous European Union (EU) member state. Spanning the majority of the Iberian Peninsula, its territory also includes the Canary Islands, in the Eastern Atlantic Ocean; the Balearic Islands, in the Western Mediterranean Sea; and the autonomous cities of Ceuta and Melilla, in mainland Africa. Spain is bordered to the north by France, Andorra, and the Bay of Biscay; to the east and south by the Mediterranean Sea, Gibraltar and Morocco (the latter being through its exclaves in North Africa); and to the west by Portugal and the Atlantic Ocean. Spain's capital and largest city is Madrid; other major urban areas include Barcelona, Valencia, Zaragoza, Seville, Bilbao, Málaga, Murcia, Palma de Mallorca and Las Palmas.

Spain is a secular parliamentary democracy and a constitutional monarchy, with King Felipe VI as head of state. A developed country, it has a high nominal GDP per capita globally and an advanced economy that ranks among the largest in the world and the fourth-largest in the EU. The official language at the national level is Spanish, the world's second-most spoken native language, although other regional languages also have official status in their respective autonomous communities.

== General reference ==
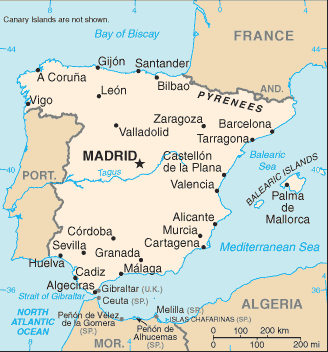
A political map of Spain, without the Canary Islands

- Pronunciation:
  - English /speɪn/
  - Spanish: pronounced [esˈpaɲa])
- Common English country name: Spain
- Official English country name: The Kingdom of Spain
- Common endonym: España
- Official endonym: Reino de España
- Adjectival: Spanish
- Demonym: Spaniard
- Etymology: Name of Spain
- International rankings of Spain
- ISO country codes: ES, ESP, 724
- ISO region codes: ISO 3166-2:ES
- Internet country code top-level domain: .es
- International Direct Dialing uses the prefix +34. Then a first digit 9 or 8 indicates a fixed landline, 6 or 7 are for mobile cellphones
- Vehicle registration plates: 1234 ABC format.

== Geography of Spain ==
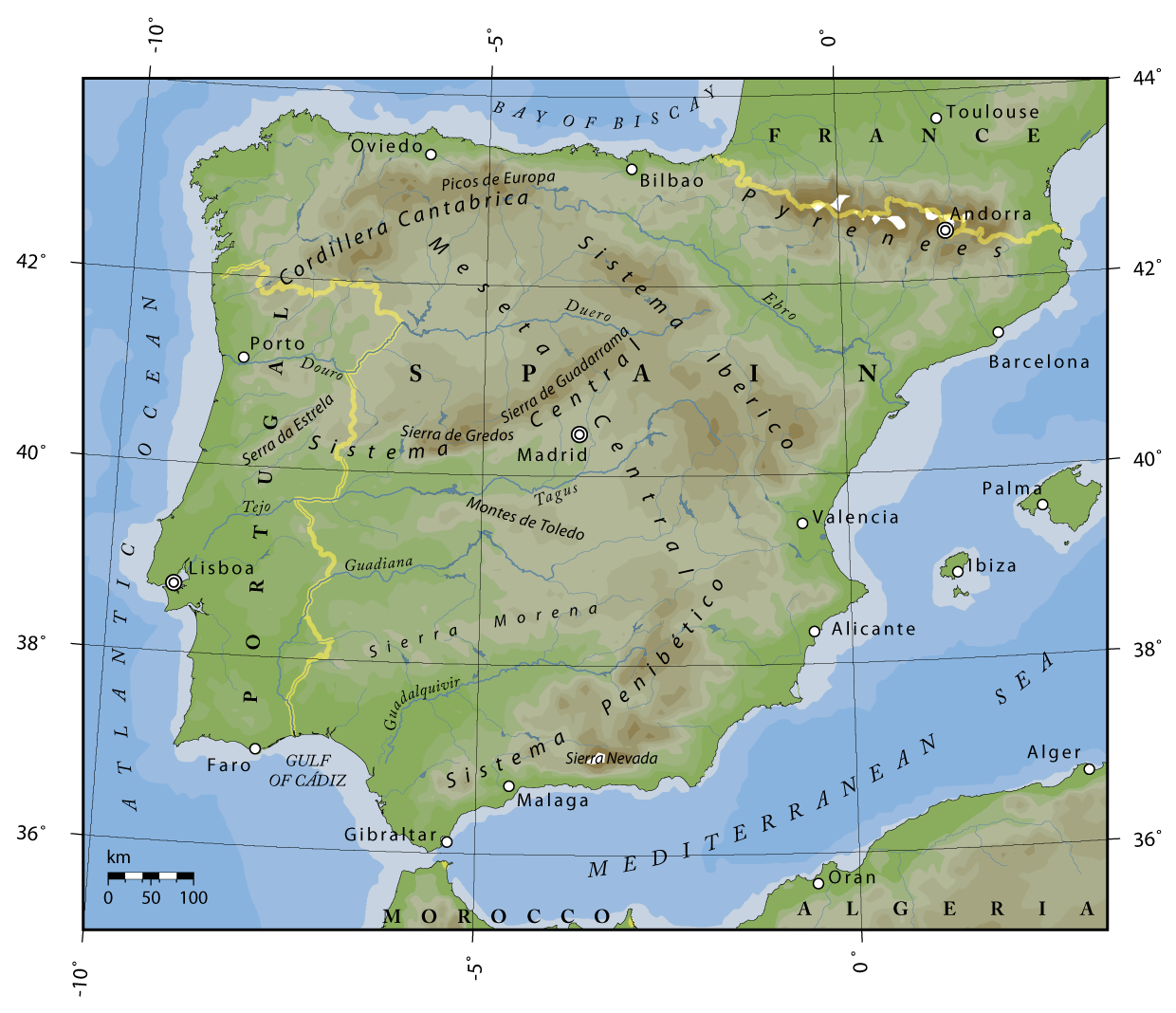
An enlargeable topographic map of Spain, except the Canary Islands and Menorca

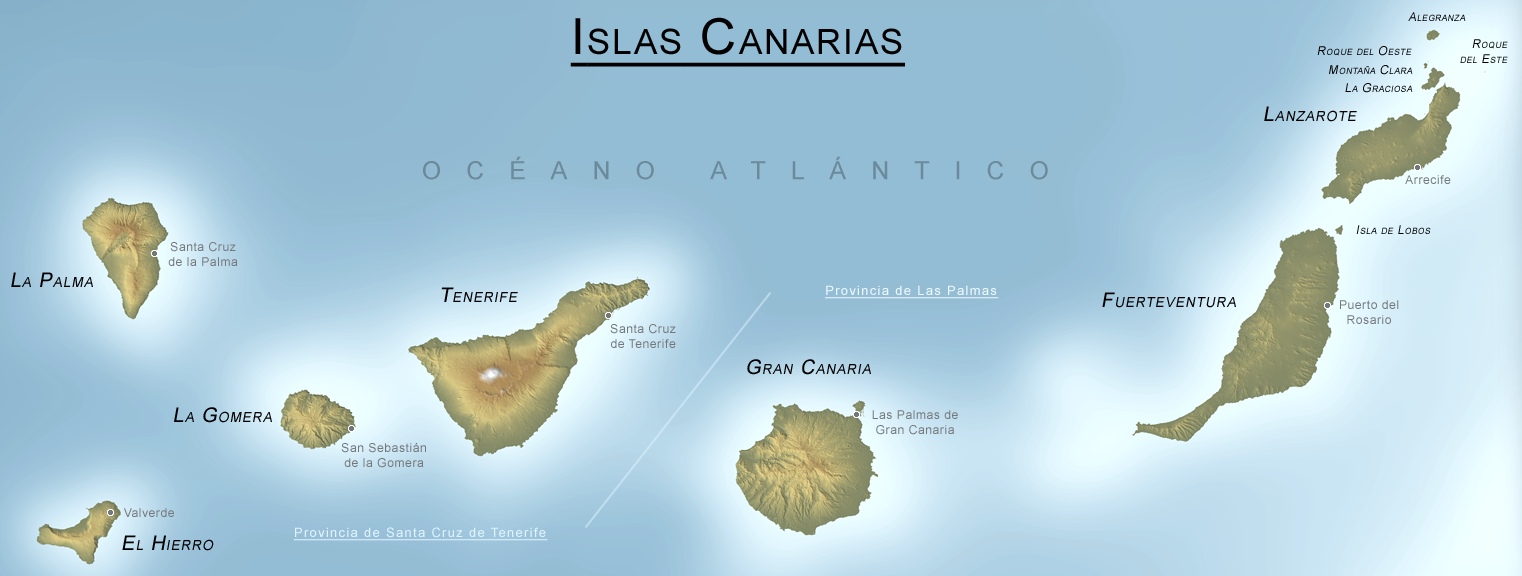
Map of the Canary Islands

Geography of Spain

- Time zones:
  - Canary Islands – Western European Time (UTC+00), Western European Summer Time (UTC+01)
  - Rest of Spain – Central European Time (UTC+01), Central European Summer Time (UTC+02)
- Extreme points of Spain
  - High: Teide on Tenerife 3,718 m (12,198 ft) - highest point in all of Spain
    Mulhacén 3,479 m (11,414 ft) - highest point in continental Spain
  - Low: North Atlantic Ocean and Mediterranean Sea 0 m
- Borders of Spain
  - Land boundaries: 1,918 km
  - Coastline: 4,964 km
- Topography of Spain

=== Location ===
- Northern Hemisphere, on the Prime Meridian
- Eurasia
  - Europe
    - Southern Europe
    - Western Europe
    - Iberian Peninsula – Spain occupies most of this peninsula, sharing it with Portugal, Andorra and Gibraltar

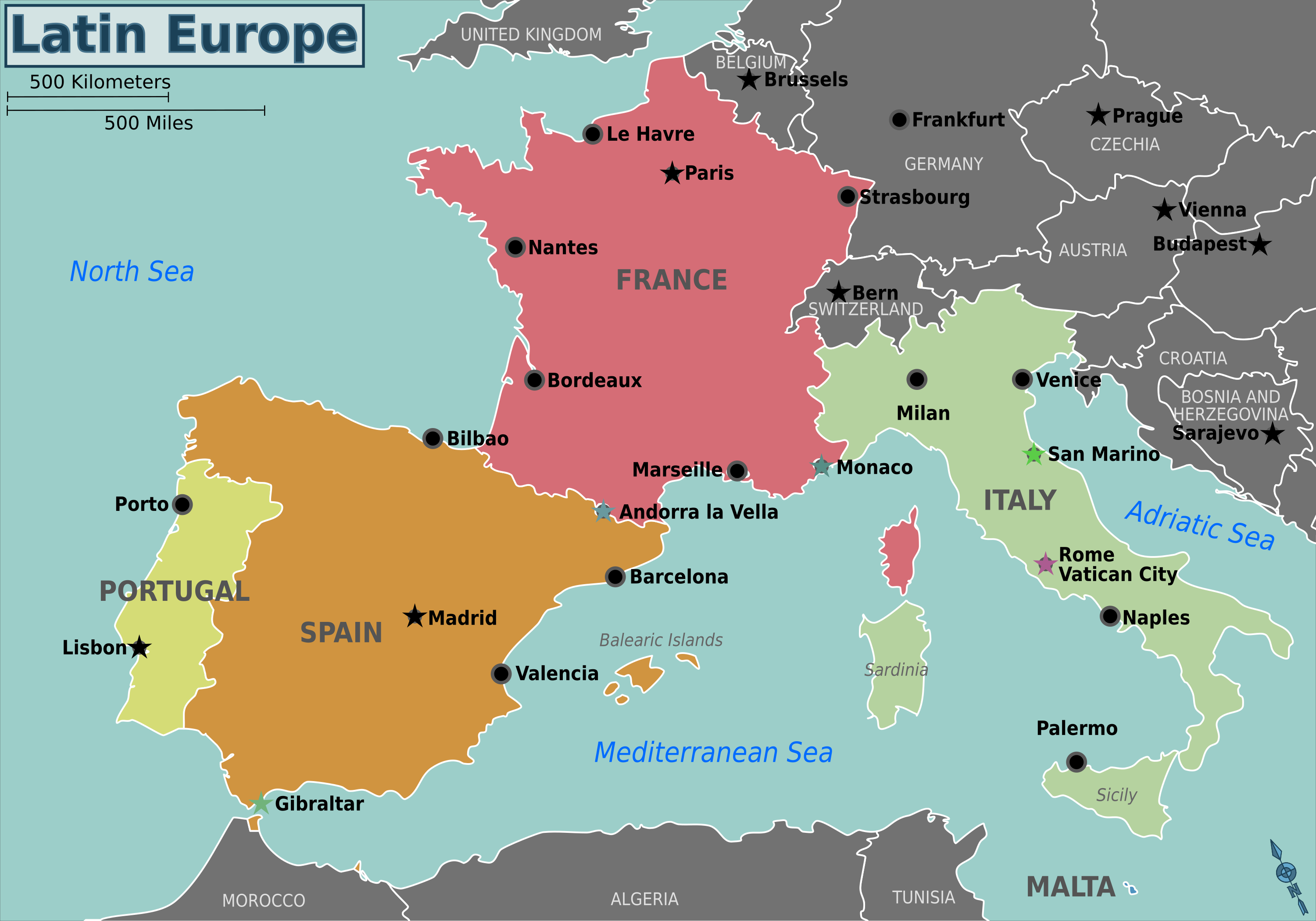
Map of the surrounding European countries: Portugal, France, Italy, Andorra and the United Kingdom (Gibraltar)

Portugal 1,214 km
France 623 km
Andorra 64 km
Morocco 16 km
Gibraltar 1 km, not recognized by Spain

- Population of Spain: 49,442,844 (October 2025) - 31th most populous country
- Area of Spain: 506,000 km^{2}
  - Second largest country in Western Europe (behind France)
- Altitude:
  - Average altitude: 650 m
  - Rank: second highest country in Europe (behind Switzerland)
- Atlas of Spain

=== Environment of Spain ===
Line graphic showing CO2 emissions from 1830 to 2023

- Geology of Spain
- Climate of Spain
- Renewable energy in Spain
- Environmental issues in Spain
  - Climate change in Spain
    - Drought in Spain
    - Extreme temperatures in Spain
  - Earthquakes in Spain
  - Forestry in Spain
- National parks of Spain
- Wildlife of Spain
  - Fauna of Spain
    - Birds of Spain
    - Insects of Spain
      - Butterflies of Spain
    - Mammals of Spain
    - Reptiles of Spain
    - Freshwater fish of Spain
    - Animal welfare and rights in Spain
      - Hunting in Spain

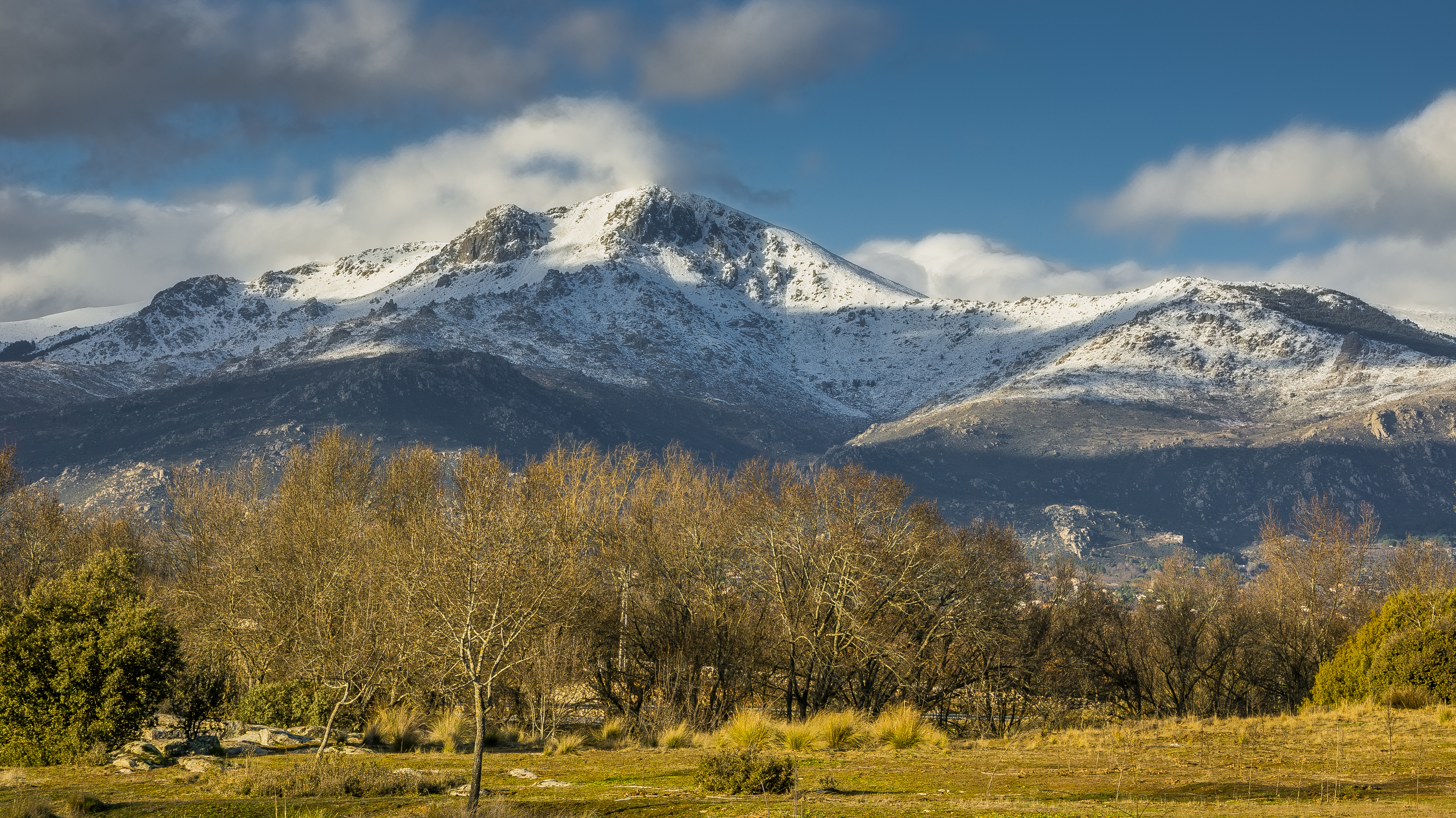
The Pico de la Maliciosa, in the Sierra de Guadarrama

==== Natural geographic features of Spain ====
- Beaches in Spain
- Caves in Spain
- Deserts of Spain
- Glaciers of Spain
- Islands of Spain
- Lakes of Spain
- Wetlands in Spain
- Mountains of Spain
  - Volcanoes in Spain
- Rivers of Spain
- World Heritage Sites in Spain
  - 12 Treasures of Spain
- Instituto Geográfico Nacional

=== Regions of Spain ===
==== Ecological regions of Spain ====
- Ecoregions in Spain
  - Biosphere reserves in Spain

==== Administrative divisions of Spain ====
Map in Spanish showing the provinces of Spain

Administrative divisions of Spain

- Autonomous communities of Spain
  - Provinces of Spain
    - Municipalities of Spain
- History of the regional distinctions of Spain
  - 1822 territorial division of Spain
  - 1833 territorial division of Spain
- NUTS statistical regions of Spain

===== Autonomous communities of Spain =====
Map showing the autonomous communities of Spain in French

Autonomous communities of Spain – each has its own parliament and government

- By name:
  - Andalusia
  - Aragon
  - Principality of Asturias
  - Balearic Islands
  - Basque Country
  - Canary Islands
  - Cantabria
  - Castile–La Mancha
  - Castile and León
  - Catalonia
  - Extremadura
  - Galicia
  - La Rioja
  - Community of Madrid
  - Region of Murcia
  - Chartered Community of Navarre
  - Valencian Community
- By statistic:
  - Spanish autonomous communities by area
  - Spanish autonomous communities by population
  - Spanish autonomous communities by GDP
  - Spanish autonomous communities by median income

===== Autonomous cities of Spain =====
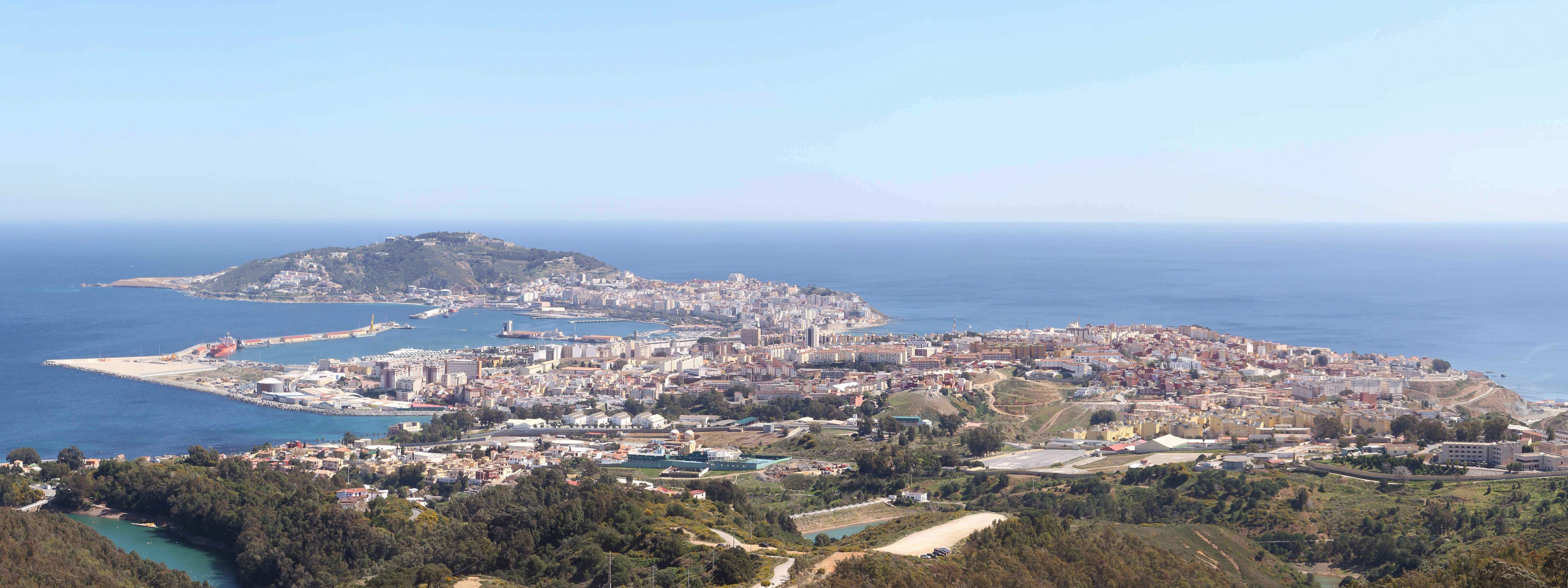
View of the city of Ceuta

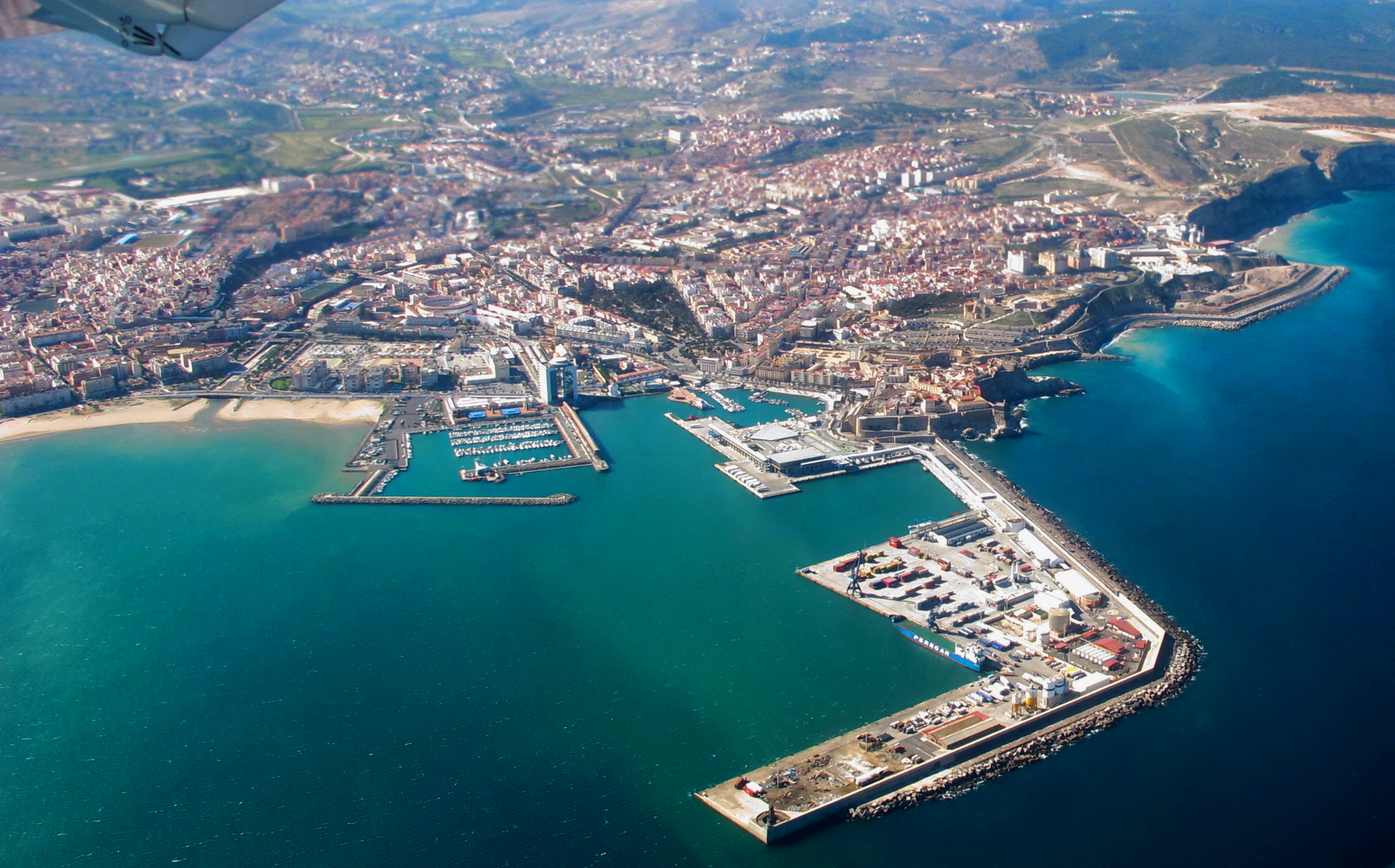
View of the city of Melilla

Autonomous cities of Spain – less autonomous than the autonomous communities, but with more autonomy than Spain's other cities

- Ceuta
- Melilla

===== Other territory =====
- Spanish exclaves:
  - Ceuta
  - Melilla
  - Llívia
- Places of sovereignty near Morocco, consisting of:
  - Islas Chafarinas
  - Peñón de Alhucemas
  - Peñón de Vélez de la Gomera
  - Isla de Alborán
  - Isla Perejil

===== Provinces of Spain =====
Provinces of Spain

- Ranked lists of autonomous communities
  - Spanish provinces by area
  - Spanish provinces by coastline
  - Spanish provinces by population
- Spanish provinces by name:

Province name	Capital	Autonomous community	Lists of municipalities
A Coruña	A Coruña	Galicia	Municipalities
Álava/Araba	Vitoria-Gasteiz	Basque Country	Municipalities
Albacete	Albacete	Castile–La Mancha	Municipalities
Alicante/Alacant	Alicante/Alacant	Valencian Community	Municipalities
Almería	Almería	Andalusia	Municipalities
Asturias	Oviedo	Asturias	Municipalities
Ávila	Ávila	Castile and León	Municipalities
Badajoz	Badajoz	Extremadura	Municipalities
Balearic Islands (Illes Balears/ Islas Baleares)	Palma de Mallorca	Balearic Islands	Municipalities
Barcelona	Barcelona	Catalonia	Municipalities
Bizkaia/Vizcaya	Bilbao	Basque Country	Municipalities
Burgos	Burgos	Castile and León	Municipalities
Cáceres	Cáceres	Extremadura	Municipalities
Cádiz	Cádiz	Andalusia	Municipalities
Cantabria	Santander	Cantabria	Municipalities
Castellón/Castelló	Castellón de la Plana/Castelló de la Plana	Valencian Community	Municipalities
Ciudad Real	Ciudad Real	Castile–La Mancha	Municipalities
Córdoba	Córdoba	Andalusia	Municipalities
Cuenca	Cuenca	Castile–La Mancha	Municipalities
Girona	Girona	Catalonia	Municipalities
Granada	Granada	Andalusia	Municipalities
Guadalajara	Guadalajara	Castile–La Mancha	Municipalities
Gipuzkoa/Guipúzcoa	San Sebastián/Donostia	Basque Country	Municipalities
Huelva	Huelva	Andalusia	Municipalities
Huesca	Huesca	Aragon	Municipalities
Jaén	Jaén	Andalusia	Municipalities
La Rioja	Logroño	La Rioja	Municipalities
León	León	Castile and León	Municipalities
Lleida	Lleida	Catalonia	Municipalities
Lugo	Lugo	Galicia	Municipalities
Madrid	Madrid	Community of Madrid	Municipalities
Málaga	Málaga	Andalusia	Municipalities
Murcia	Murcia	Region of Murcia	Municipalities
Navarra/Nafarroa	Pamplona/Iruña	Navarre	Municipalities
Ourense	Ourense	Galicia	Municipalities
Palencia	Palencia	Castile and León	Municipalities
Las Palmas	Las Palmas de Gran Canaria	Canary Islands	Municipalities
Pontevedra	Pontevedra	Galicia	Municipalities
Salamanca	Salamanca	Castile and León	Municipalities
Santa Cruz de Tenerife	Santa Cruz de Tenerife	Canary Islands	Municipalities
Segovia	Segovia	Castile and León	Municipalities
Seville (Sevilla)	Seville (Sevilla)	Andalusia	Municipalities
Soria	Soria	Castile and León	Municipalities
Tarragona	Tarragona	Catalonia	Municipalities
Teruel	Teruel	Aragon	Municipalities
Toledo	Toledo	Castile–La Mancha	Municipalities
Valencia/València	Valencia/València	Valencian Community	Municipalities
Valladolid	Valladolid	Castile and León	Municipalities
Zamora	Zamora	Castile and León	Municipalities
Zaragoza	Zaragoza	Aragon	Municipalities

===== Comarcas of Spain =====
Map showing the comarcas of Spain

Comarcas of Spain

- Comarcas of Aragon
- Comarcas of Asturias
- Comarques of Catalonia
- Comarques of the Valencian Community

===== Municipalities of Spain =====
Municipalities of Spain

- Capital of Spain: Madrid
- Metropolitan areas in Spain
- Municipalities of Spain – Spain's approximately 8100 municipalities comprise the basic level of Spanish local government.
  - Autonomous cities of Spain
  - Ranked lists of Spanish municipalities

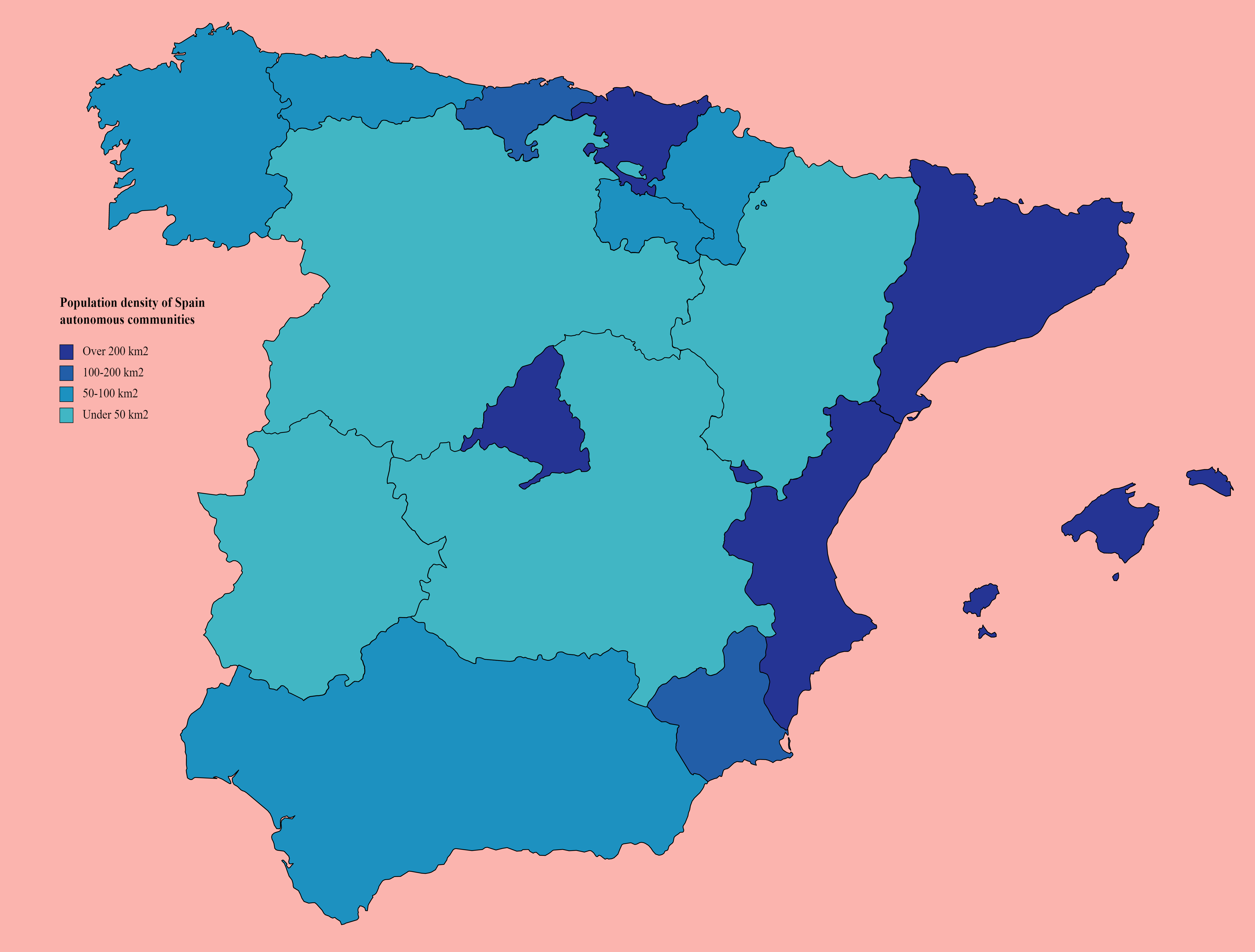
Enlargable demographic map of Spain.

=== Demography of Spain ===
Demographics of Spain

- People of Spain
  - Spanish supercentenarians
  - Notable Spaniards
- Immigration to Spain
  - British immigration in Spain

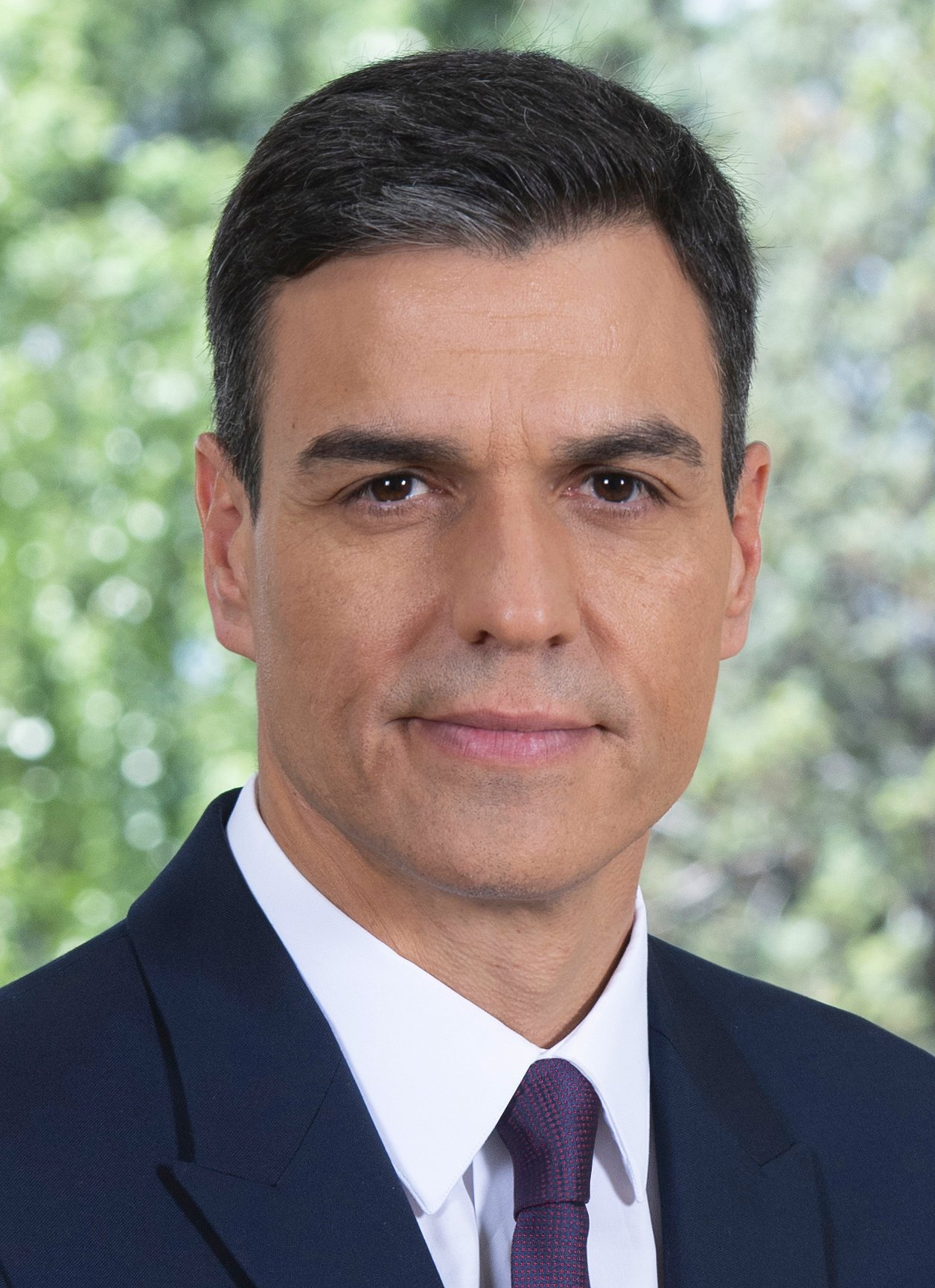
Pedro Sánchez, the current Prime Minister of Spain.

== Government and politics of Spain ==
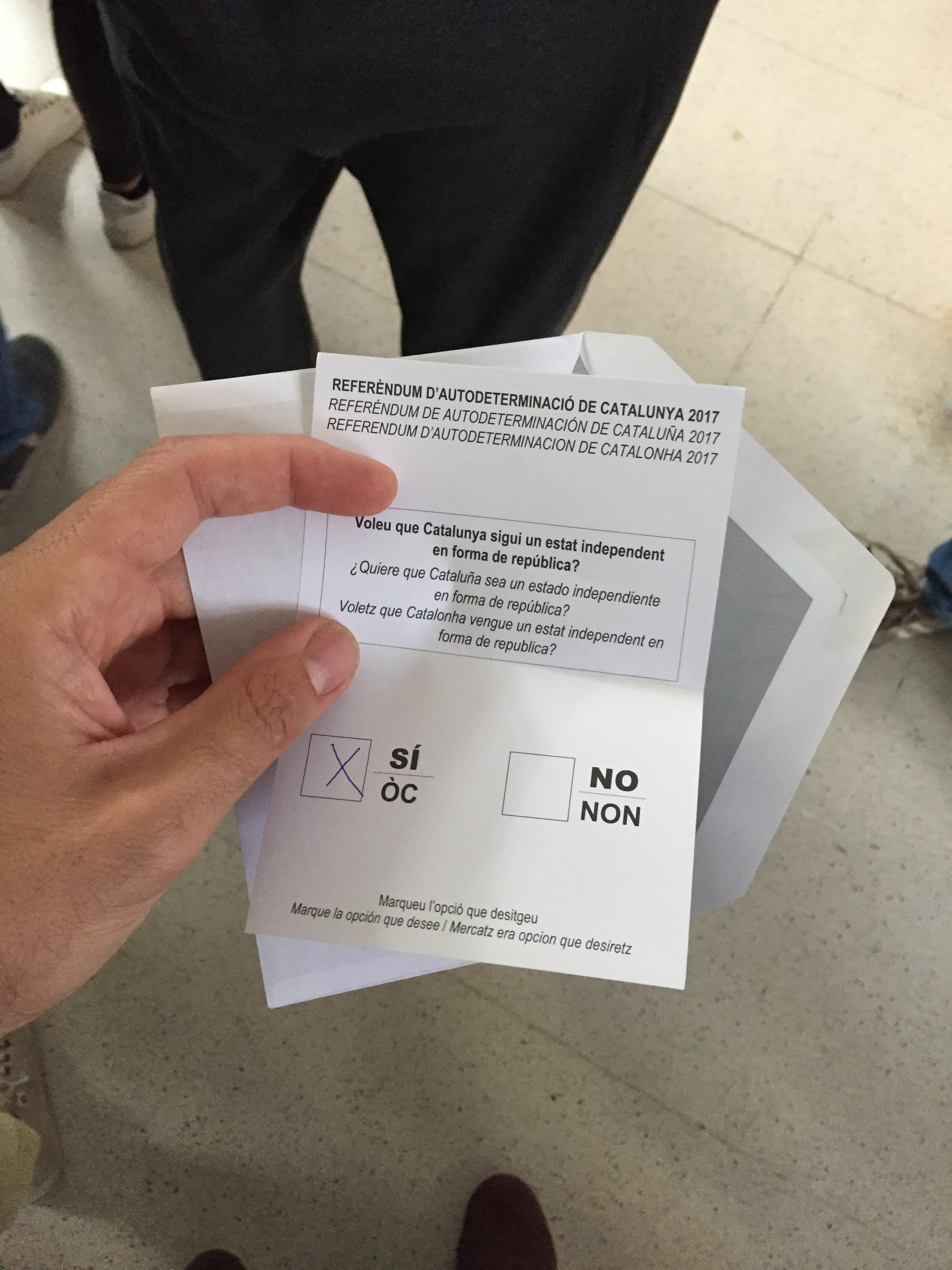
A yes vote in the 2017 Catalan independence referendum.

Politics of Spain

- Spain is a:
  - Country
    - Developed country
  - Nation state
    - Sovereign state
  - Member state
    - Member State of the European Union
    - Member state of NATO
    - Member state of the United Nations
    - See also International organization membership, below
- Form of government: Constitutional monarchy
- Capital of Spain: Madrid
- Corruption in Spain
- Federalism in Spain
- Elections in Spain
  - General elections in Spain
  - 2017 Catalan independence referendum
- Political parties in Spain
  - Partido Popular or PP Mainstream Centre-Right associated with the main Employers Organization and clerics.
  - Partido Socialista Obrero Español mainstream social-democrats linked to Unión General de Trabajadores trade union and the Confederación Empresarial de Economia Social.
  - Sumar, a coalition of smaller left-wing parties.
  - Vox, a far-right political party
  - Political parties in Catalonia
- Social Security in Spain
- Taxation in Spain
- Political positions and movements in Spain
  - Anarchism in Spain
  - Anti-austerity movement in Spain
  - Anti-nuclear movement in Spain
  - Labor movement in Spain
  - Liberalism and radicalism in Spain
  - Pacifism in Spain
  - Republicanism in Spain
  - Insubordinate movement in Spain

The current royal spanish coat of arms.

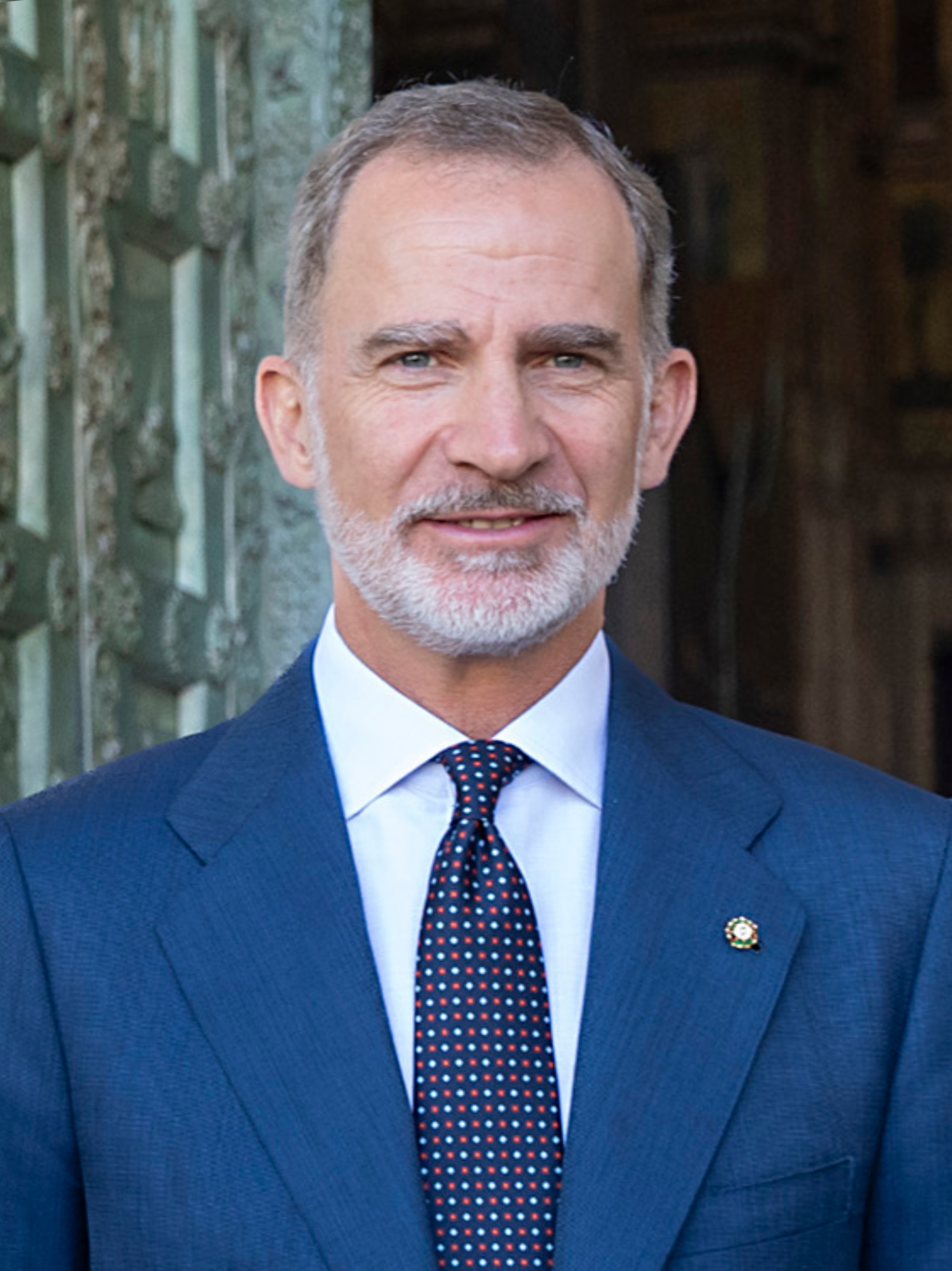
Felipe VI, the current monarch of Spain.

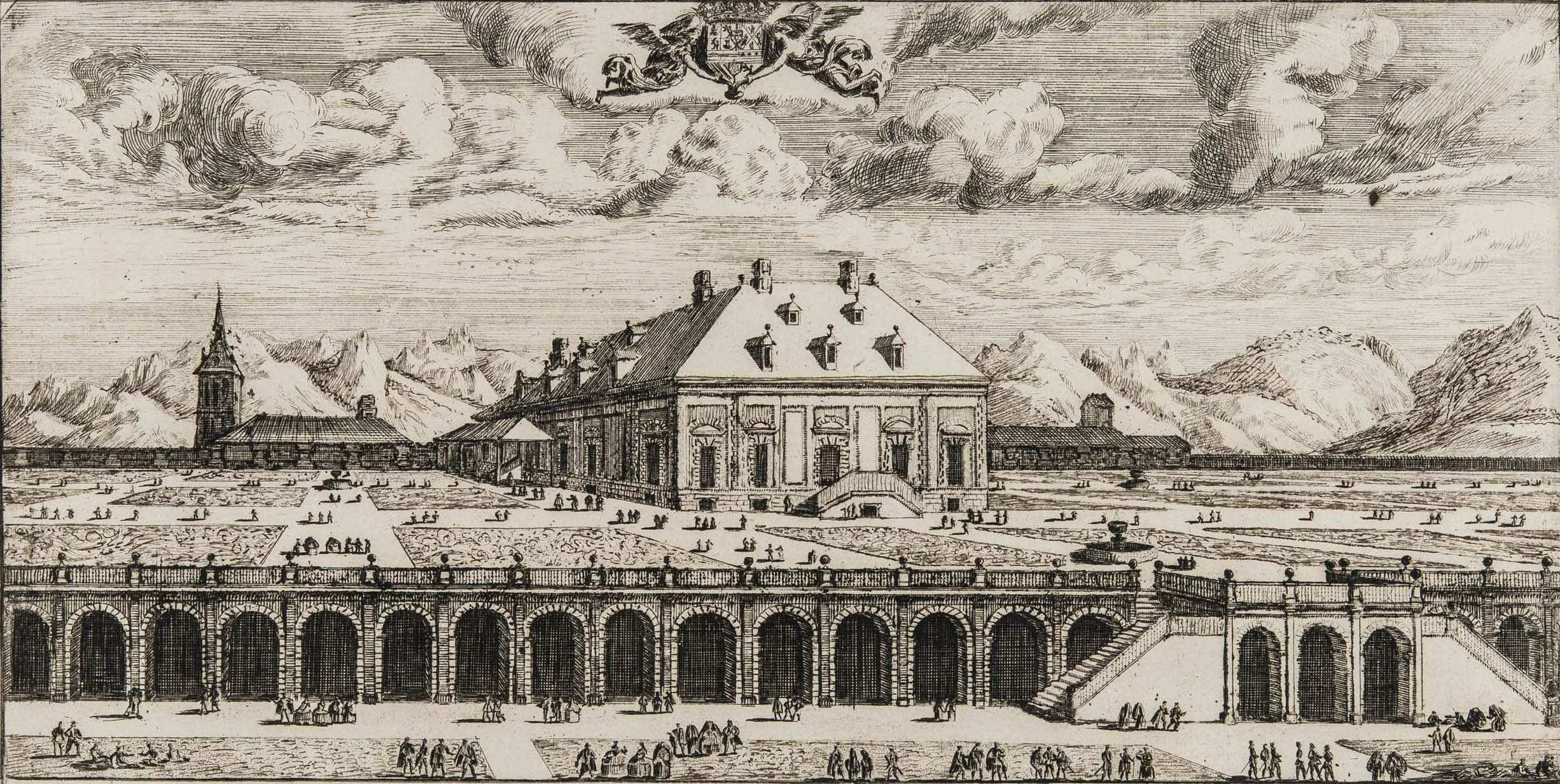
A depiction of the Palacio de la Zarzuela in Madrid.

=== Monarchy of Spain ===
Monarchy of Spain

- Head of state: King of Spain, Felipe VI
  - Former heads of state of Spain
  - Christmas Eve National Speech
  - Coat of arms of the King of Spain
- Royal Household of Spain
  - Spanish Royal Family
    - Juan Carlos I
    - Spanish consorts
      - Queen Sophia of Spain
      - Queen Letizia of Spain
    - Leonor, Princess of Asturias
    - Infantas of Spain
      - Infanta Sofía
  - Royal Household and Heritage of the Crown of Spain
    - Caballerizo mayor
    - Gentilhombres Grandes de España con ejercicio y servidumbre
- Spanish royal sites
  - Patrimonio Nacional
    - Palacio Real
    - Palacio de la Zarzuela
- Spanish monarchs
  - Family tree of Spanish monarchs
    - Royal descendants of John William Friso
    - Line of succession to the Spanish throne
      - Descendants of Charles III of Spain
      - Descendants of Philip V of Spain
      - Descendants of Alfonso XIII of Spain
      - Ancestry of Juan Carlos I of Spain
      - Ancestry of Felipe VI of Spain
    - Act for the Marriage of Queen Mary to Philip of Spain
    - Affair of the Spanish Marriages
    - Heirs to the Spanish throne
    - Spanish regents
- Spanish nobility
  - Forms of address in Spain
  - Mayordomo mayor
  - Camarera mayor de Palacio
    - Grandee, a title given to the majority of Spanish nobility, including all dukedoms with one exception and no barons.
      - Chamber of Peers (Spain)
      - Current grandees of Spain
        - Dukedoms of Spain
- Titles and honours of the Spanish Crown
  - Titles and honours of Juan Carlos I
  - Titles and honours of Queen Sofía of Spain
  - Titles and honours of Felipe VI
  - Titles and honours of Queen Letizia of Spain
  - Titles and honours of Leonor, Princess of Asturias
- Coat of arms of Spain
  - Coat of arms of the Prince of Asturias
  - Royal Standard of Spain
- Sumiller de Corps
  - Mayordomos de semana
  - Gentilhombres de cámara con ejercicio
- Imperator totius Hispaniae, a medieval title for the emperor of Spain in Latin
- Bourbon claim to the Spanish throne
- Crown of Aragon
- Kingdom of Gibraltar

Official logo of the Government of Spain.

=== Branches of the government of Spain ===
Government of Spain

==== Executive branch of the government of Spain ====
- Head of state: King of Spain, Felipe VI
  - Former heads of state of Spain
- Head of government: Prime Minister of Spain (Presidente del Gobierno), Pedro Sánchez
  - Former prime ministers of Spain
  - Deputy Prime Minister of Spain
  - Second Deputy Prime Minister of Spain
- Leader of the Opposition (Spain)
- Cabinet of Spain (Council of Ministers)

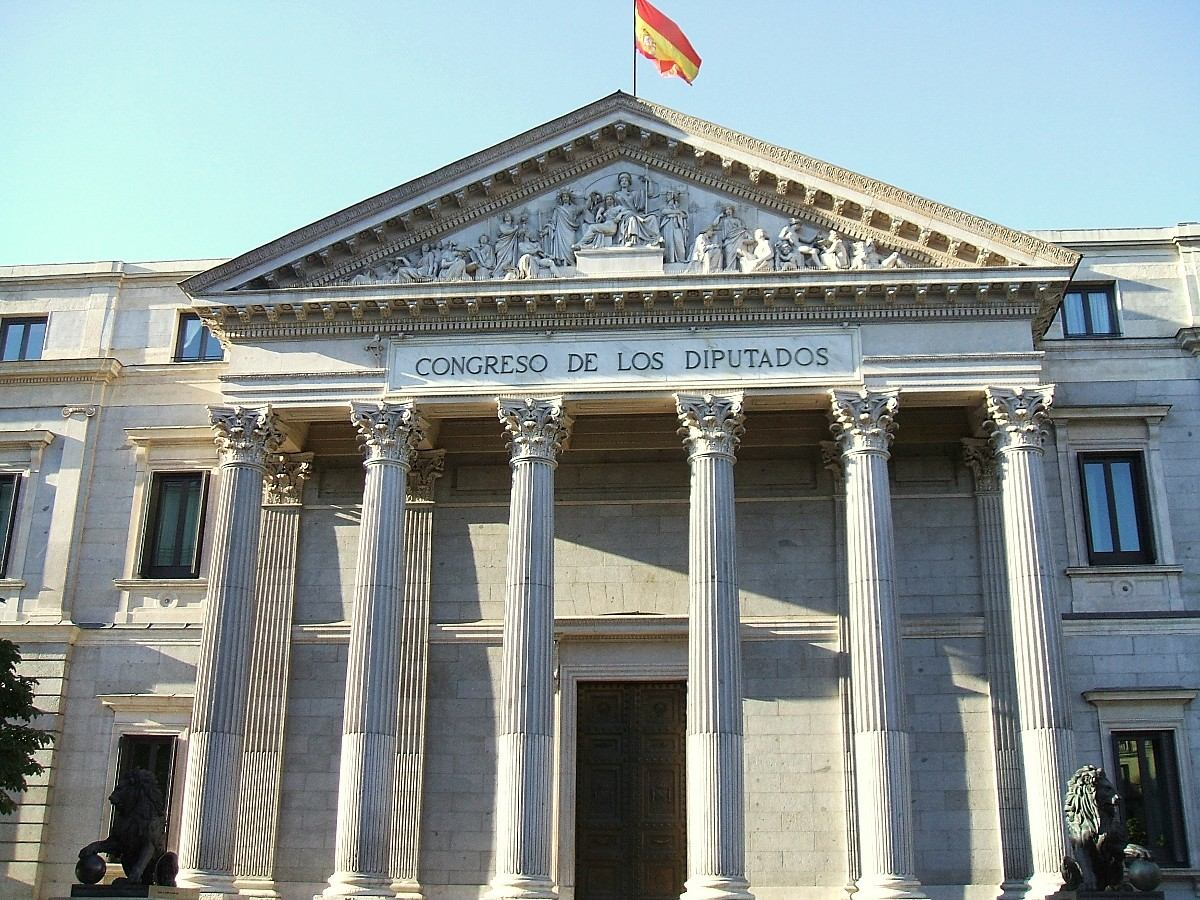
The spanish parliament's facade.

==== Legislative branch of the government of Spain ====
- Parliament of Spain – bicameral legislature of Spain, consisting of:
  - Upper house: Senate of Spain
  - Lower house: Congress of Deputies (Spain)

==== Judicial branch of the government of Spain ====
- Spanish judicial system
  - General Council of the Judicial Power of Spain
  - Constitutional Court of Spain
  - Supreme Court of Spain

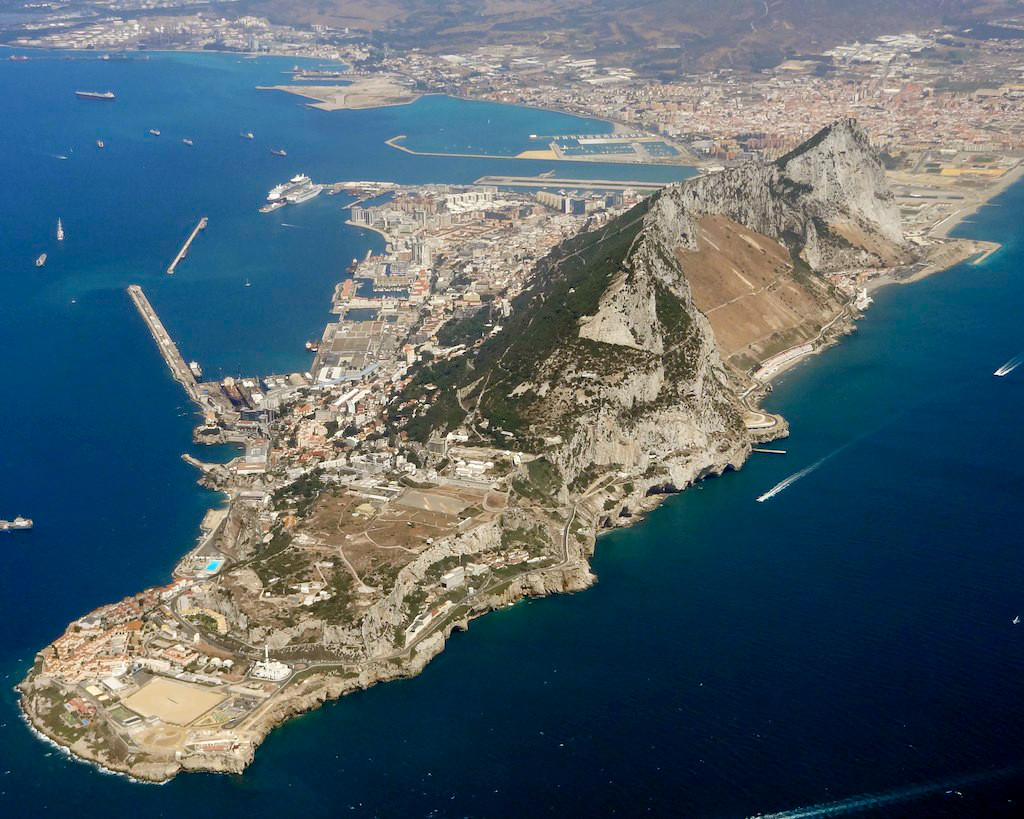
An aerial view of Gibraltar, currently not recognized by Spain

=== Foreign relations of Spain ===
Foreign relations of Spain

- Diplomatic missions in Spain
- Foreign Ministers of Spain
  - Diplomatic missions of Spain
- Centro Nacional de Inteligencia
- Burning of the Spanish Embassy
- Disputed status of the isthmus between Gibraltar and Spain

==== International organization membership ====
The Kingdom of Spain is a member of:

- African Development Bank Group (AfDB) (nonregional member)
- Arctic Council (observer)
- Asian Development Bank (ADB) (nonregional member)
- Australia Group
- Bank for International Settlements (BIS)
- Central American Bank for Economic Integration (BCIE)
- Central American Integration System (SICA) (observer)
- Confederation of European Paper Industries (CEPI)
- Council of Europe (CE)
- Economic and Monetary Union (EMU)
- Euro-Atlantic Partnership Council (EAPC)
- European Bank for Reconstruction and Development (EBRD)
- European Investment Bank (EIB)
- European Organization for Nuclear Research (CERN)
- European Space Agency (ESA)
- European Union (EU)
- Food and Agriculture Organization (FAO)
- Inter-American Development Bank (IADB)
- International Atomic Energy Agency (IAEA)
- International Bank for Reconstruction and Development (IBRD)
- International Chamber of Commerce (ICC)
- International Civil Aviation Organization (ICAO)
- International Criminal Court (ICCt)
- International Criminal Police Organization (Interpol)
- International Development Association (IDA)
- International Energy Agency (IEA)
- International Federation of Red Cross and Red Crescent Societies (IFRCS)
- International Finance Corporation (IFC)
- International Fund for Agricultural Development (IFAD)
- International Hydrographic Organization (IHO)
- International Labour Organization (ILO)
- International Maritime Organization (IMO)
- International Mobile Satellite Organization (IMSO)
- International Monetary Fund (IMF)
- International Olympic Committee (IOC)
- International Organization for Migration (IOM)
- International Organization for Standardization (ISO)
- International Red Cross and Red Crescent Movement (ICRM)
- International Telecommunication Union (ITU)
- International Telecommunications Satellite Organization (ITSO)
- International Trade Union Confederation (ITUC)
- Inter-Parliamentary Union (IPU)
- Latin American Integration Association (LAIA) (observer)
- Multilateral Investment Guarantee Agency (MIGA)
- Nonaligned Movement (NAM) (guest)
- North Atlantic Treaty Organization (NATO)
- Nuclear Energy Agency (NEA)
- Nuclear Suppliers Group (NSG)
- Organisation for Economic Co-operation and Development (OECD)
- Organization for Security and Cooperation in Europe (OSCE)
- Organisation for the Prohibition of Chemical Weapons (OPCW)
- Organization of American States (OAS) (observer)
- Paris Club
- Permanent Court of Arbitration (PCA)
- Schengen Convention
- Southeast European Cooperative Initiative (SECI) (observer)
- Unión Latina
- United Nations (UN)
- United Nations Conference on Trade and Development (UNCTAD)
- United Nations Educational, Scientific, and Cultural Organization (UNESCO)
- United Nations High Commissioner for Refugees (UNHCR)
- United Nations Industrial Development Organization (UNIDO)
- United Nations Interim Force in Lebanon (UNIFIL)
- United Nations Mission in the Central African Republic and Chad (MINURCAT)
- United Nations Organization Mission in the Democratic Republic of the Congo (MONUC)
- United Nations Relief and Works Agency for Palestine Refugees in the Near East (UNRWA)
- Universal Postal Union (UPU)
- Western European Union (WEU)
- World Confederation of Labour (WCL)
- World Customs Organization (WCO)
- World Federation of Trade Unions (WFTU)
- World Health Organization (WHO)
- World Intellectual Property Organization (WIPO)
- World Meteorological Organization (WMO)
- World Tourism Organization (UNWTO)
- World Trade Organization (WTO)
- Zangger Committee (ZC)

=== Law and order in Spain ===
The spanish judiciary badge for a Supreme Court member.

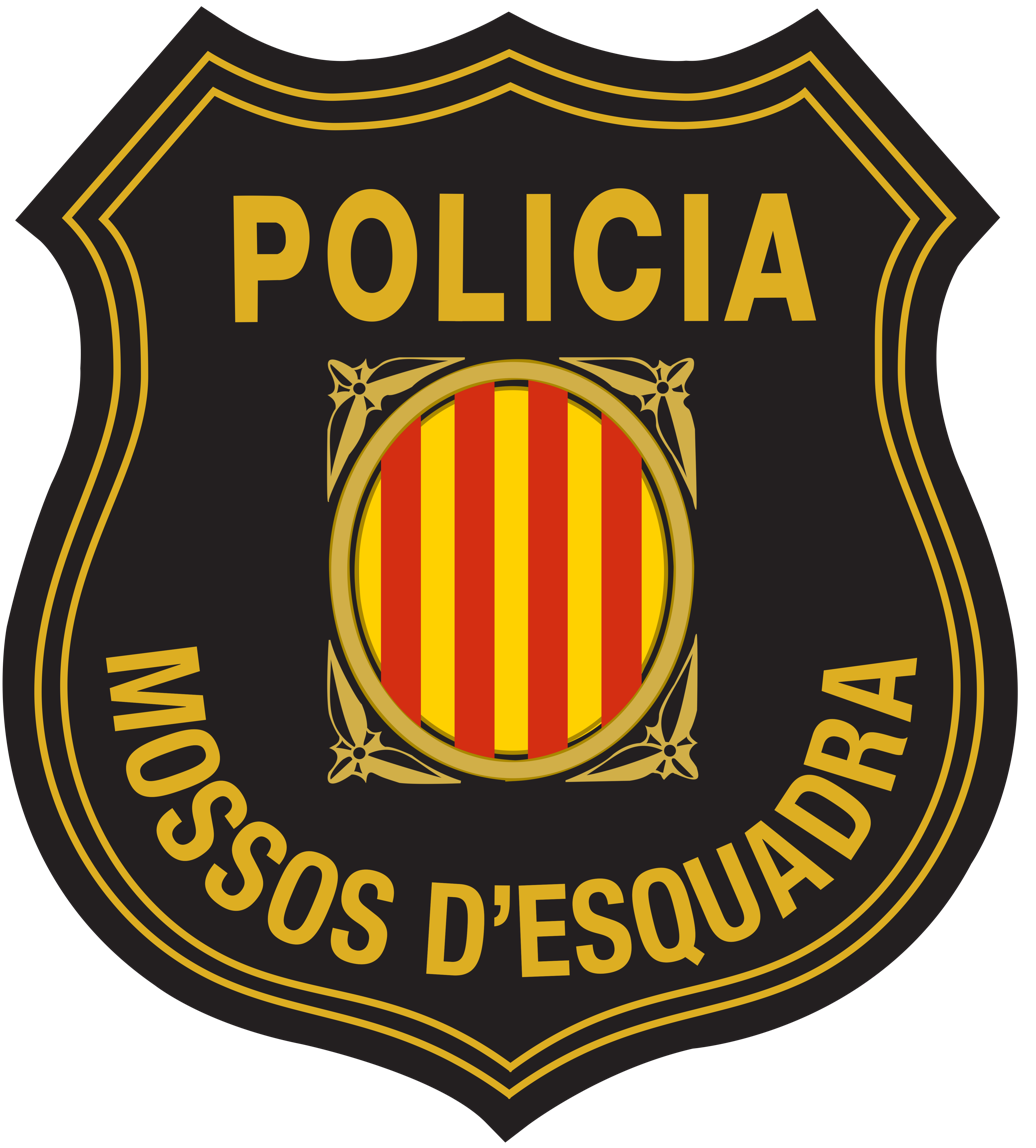
The logo of the Mossos d'Esquadra

Law of Spain

- Constitution of Spain
  - Constitutions of Spain
    - Spanish Constitution of 1978, the current constitution.
      - Amendments to the Spanish Constitution of 1978
- Civil Code of Spain
- Historical Memory Law – recognizes the victims on both sides of the Spanish Civil War, gives rights to the victims and the descendants of victims of the war and the subsequent dictatorship of Francisco Franco, and formally condemns the Franco Regime.
- Spanish referendum on the European Constitution
- Admission to legal practice in Spain

==== Crime in Spain ====
Crime in Spain

- Cannabis in Spain
- Human trafficking in Spain
  - Slavery in Spain
    - Abolition of slavery in Spain
- Homicide in Spain
  - Suicide in Spain
- Terrorism in Spain
  - ETA
  - GRAPO
  - 2004 Madrid train bombings
  - Far-right terrorism in Spain
- Squatting in Spain

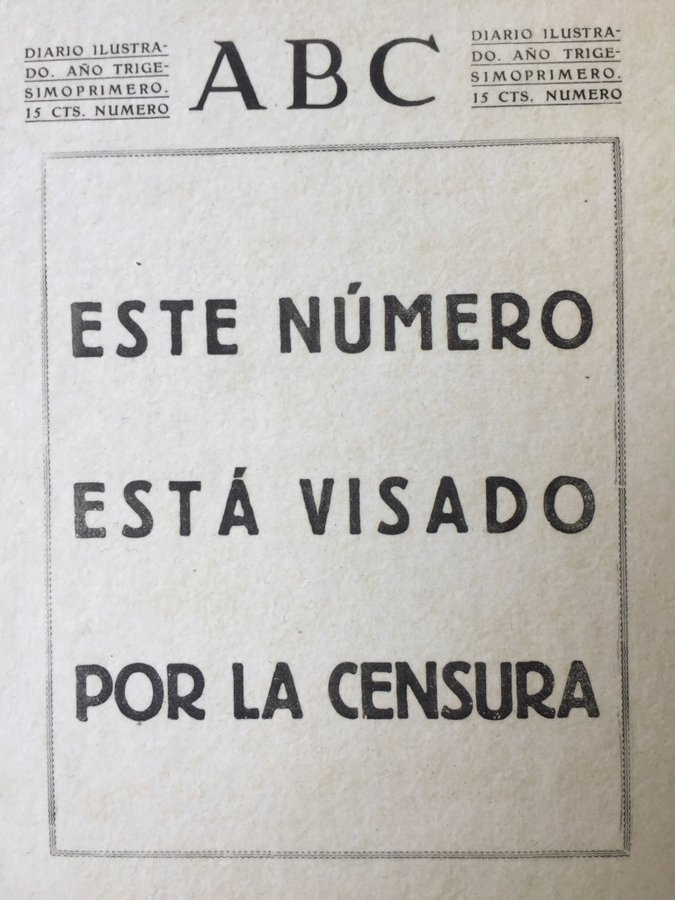
A front cover of Spanish newspaper ABC, saying that the edition was censored.

==== Human rights in Spain ====
Human rights in Spain

- Abortion in Spain
- Censorship in Spain
- Civil unions in Spain
- Copyright law of Spain
- Disability in Spain
- Euthanasia in Spain
- Family policy in Spain
  - Marriage in Spain
    - Same-sex marriage in Spain
- Homelessness in Spain
- Gender-related rights in Spain
  - Intersex rights in Spain
  - LGBTQ rights in Spain
    - Same-sex marriage in Spain
- Freedom of the press in Spain
- Prostitution in Spain
- Freedom of religion in Spain
- Racism in Spain
  - Antisemitism in Spain
  - Anti-American sentiment in Spain

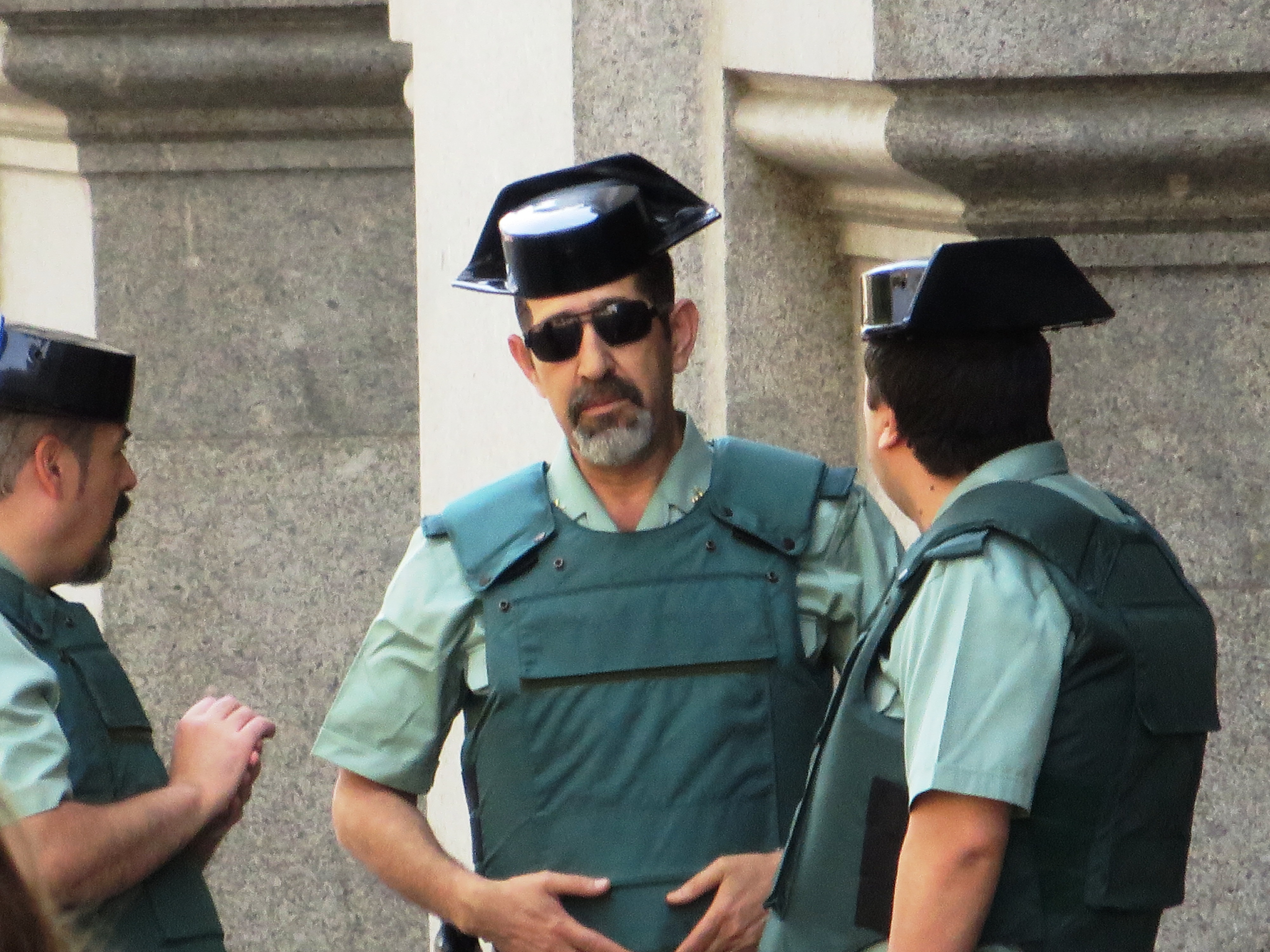
Guardia Civil officers talking

==== Law enforcement in Spain ====
Law enforcement in Spain

- Courts in Spain
  - Supreme Court of Spain
    - Audiencia Nacional
      - Audiencias Provinciales of Spain
    - Court of Auditors (Spain)
- Police in Spain
  - Police ranks of Spain
  - Guardia Civil
  - Mossos d'Esquadra
  - National Police Corps
- Punishment in Spain
  - Capital punishment in Spain
    - Last use of capital punishment in Spain
  - Life imprisonment in Spain

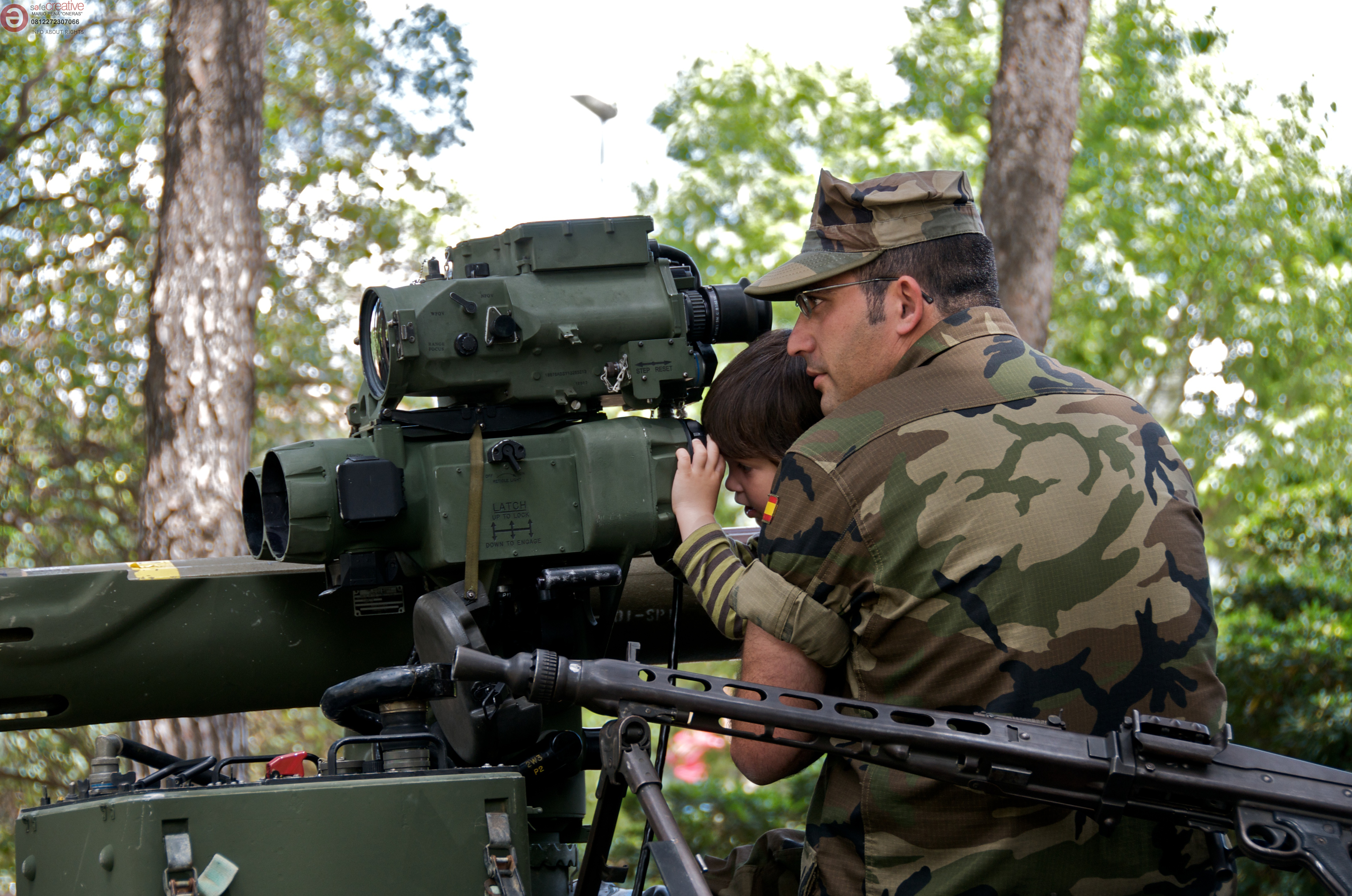
A military officer showing children a tank in the Armed Forces Day

=== Military of Spain ===
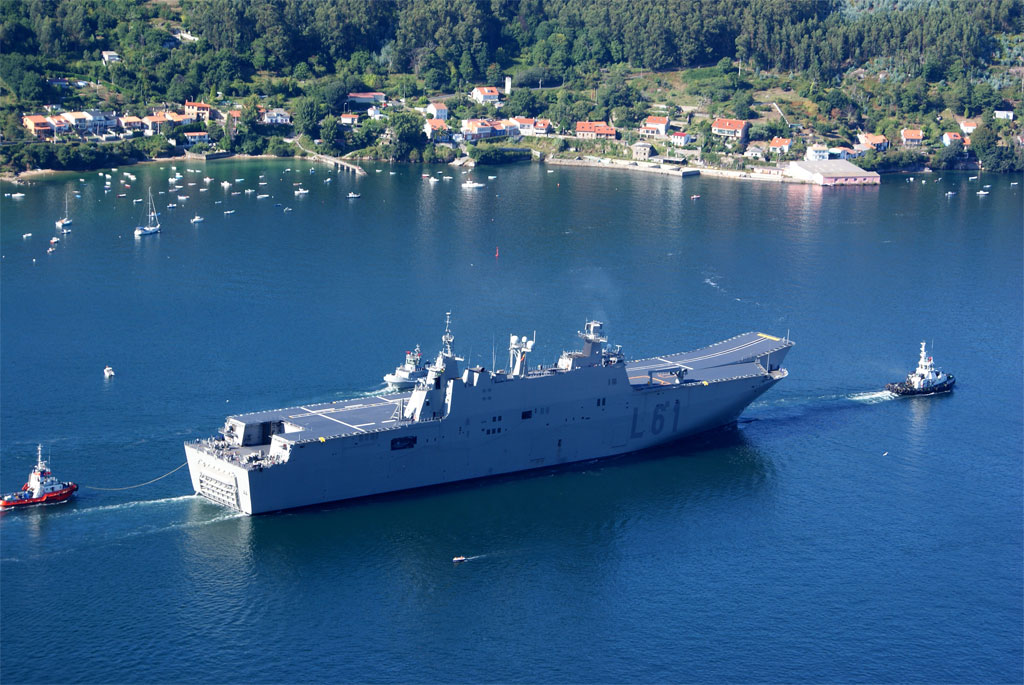
The Spanish ship Juan Carlos I entering Ferrol.

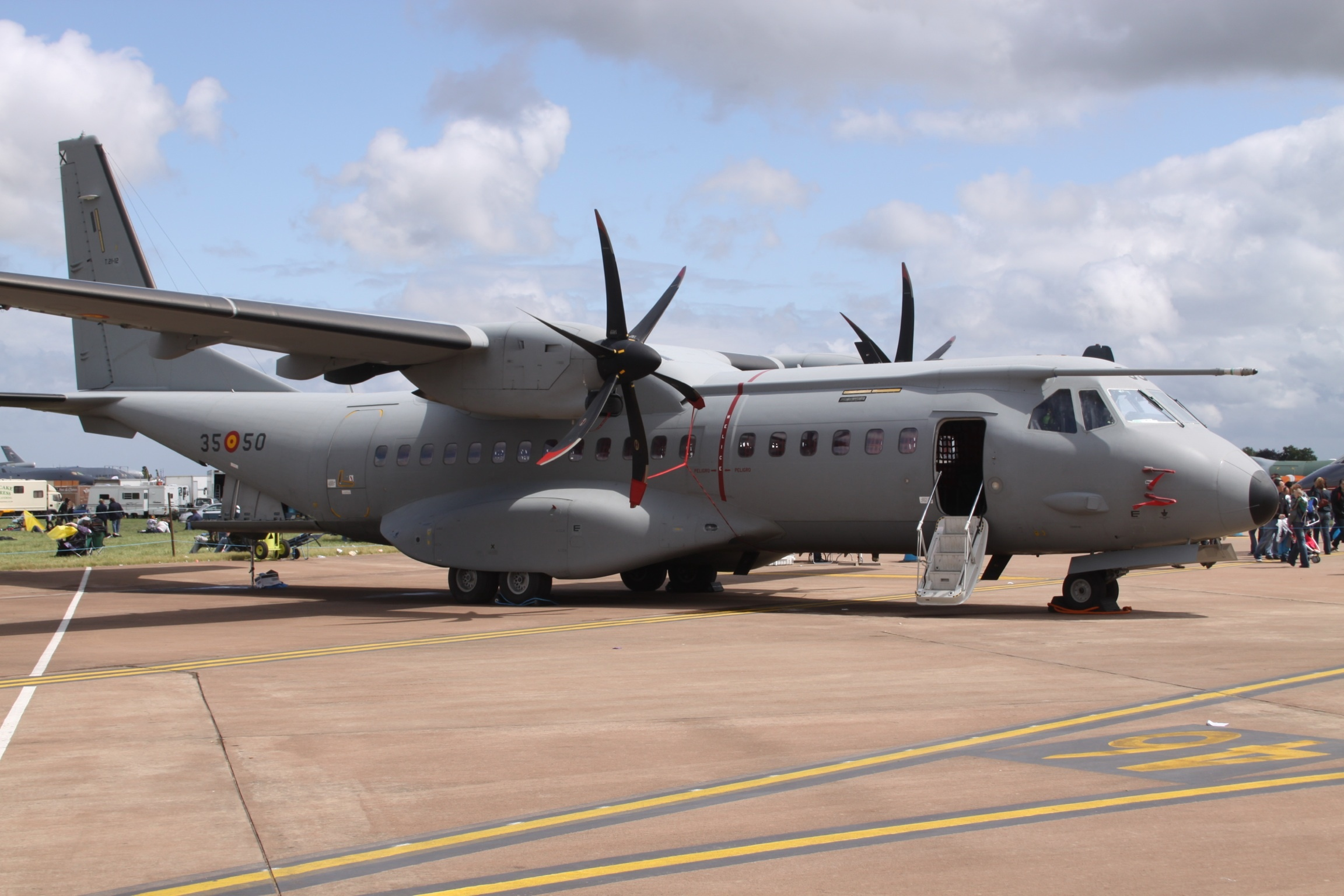
A military plane of the Air Force of Spain

Military of Spain

- Command
  - Commander-in-chief:
    - Ministry of Defence of Spain
    - Chief of the Defence Staff (Spain), principal advisor to the above.
- Forces
  - Army of Spain
    - Tanks in the Spanish Army
    - Currently active Spain military land vehicles
  - Navy of Spain
    - Ships of the line of Spain
      - Battleships of Spain
        - Active Spanish Navy ships
          - Spanish aircraft carrier Príncipe de Asturias
          - Spanish ship Juan Carlos I
        - Retired Spanish Navy ships
        - Future Spanish Navy ships
      - Spanish sail frigates
      - Cruisers of Spain
  - Air Force of Spain
  - Spanish Legion
  - Special forces of Spain
- Military history of Spain
- Military ranks of Spain
- Armorial of the Spanish Armed Forces

=== Local government in Spain ===
Local government in Spain

- Spanish regional governments
  - Spanish regional legislatures

== History of Spain ==
History of Spain

- Timeline of Spanish history

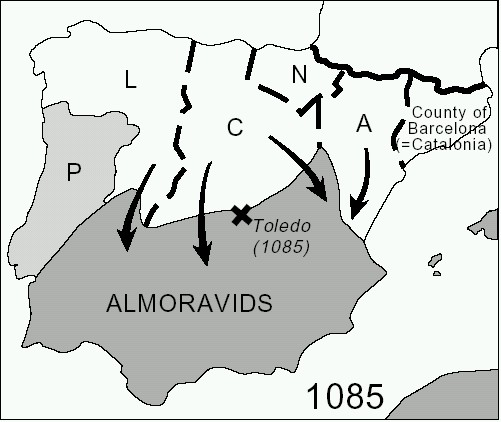
A map of the Reconquista P= Portugal, L= Kingdom of León, C= Kingdom of Castile, N= Kingdom of Navarre, A= Kingdom of Aragon.

The guidon of king Philip II of Spain

=== History of Spain by period ===
- Years in Spain
- Prehistoric Iberia
  - Timeline of pre-Roman Iberian history
  - Carthaginian Iberia
- Hispania
  - Roman Spanish
  - Timeline of the history of Roman Hispania
  - Economy of Hispania
  - Roman sites in Spain
- Spain in the Middle Ages
  - Visigothic Kingdom
  - al-Andalus
    - Umayyad conquest of Hispania
  - Reconquista
  - Black Death in Spain
  - Spanish Inquisition
    - Black Legend of the Spanish Inquisition
    - Witch trials in Spain
- Habsburg Spain
  - Emperor Charles V
- Enlightenment in Spain
- Mid-nineteenth century Spain
- Spanish confiscation
- First Spanish Republic
- Spain under the Restoration
  - Anarchist insurrection of January 1933
    - Alt Llobregat insurrection
- Second Spanish Republic
- Spanish Civil War
- Spain under Franco
- Modern Spain
- Contemporary Spain

=== History of Spain by region ===
Blind map of the autonomous communities of Spain

==== History autonomous communities in Spain ====
- History of Andalusia
- History of Aragon
- History of Asturias
- History of the Balearic Islands
- History of Basque Country
- History of the Canary Islands
- History of Cantabria
- History of Castilla-La Mancha
- History of Castile and León
- History of Catalonia
- History of Extremadura
- History of Galicia
- History of La Rioja
- History of the Community of Madrid
- History of the Region of Murcia
- History of Navarre
- History of the Valencian Community

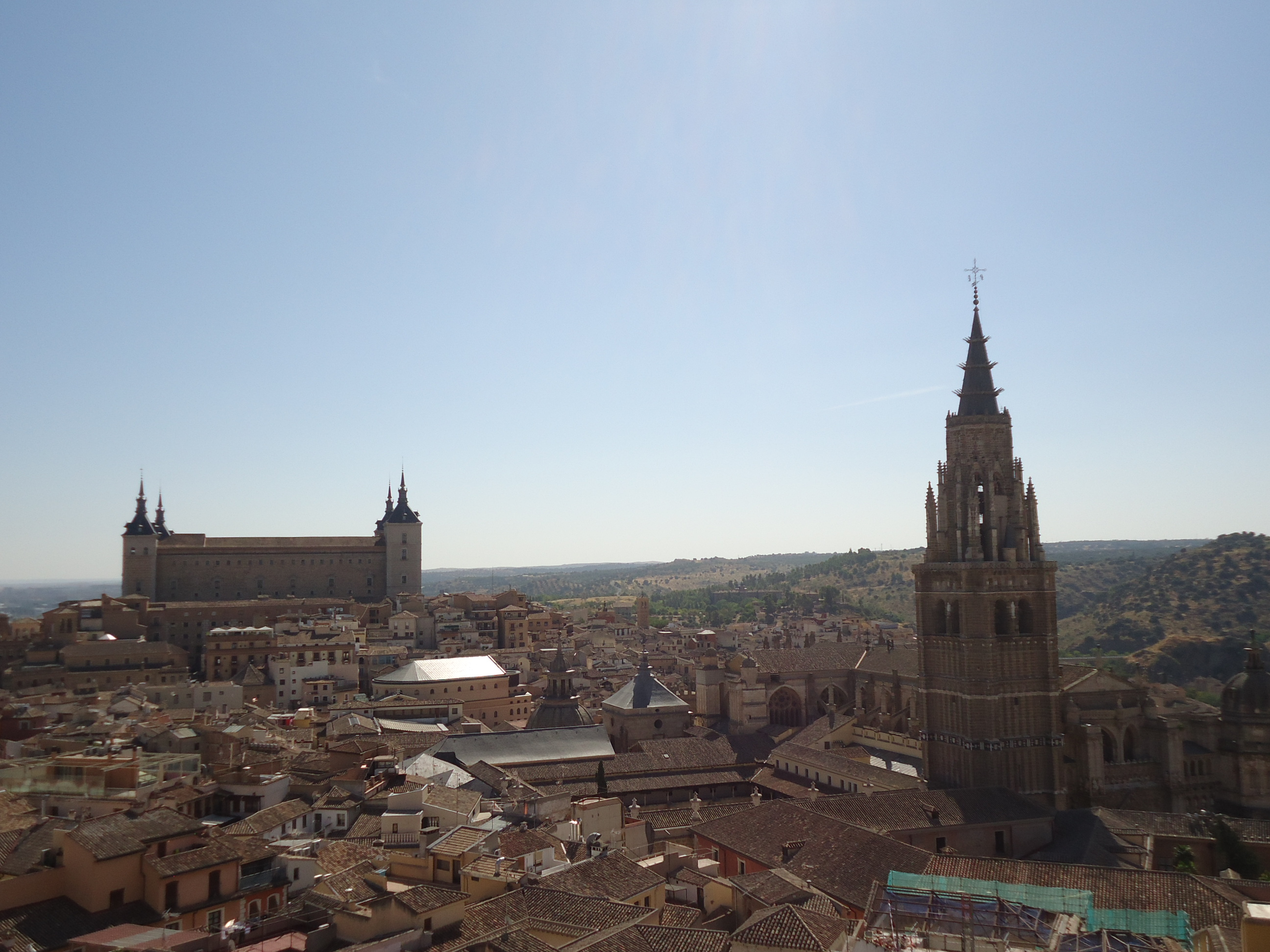
A panorama of Toledo. On the left, the Alcázar of Toledo, and on the right the Cathedral of Toledo.

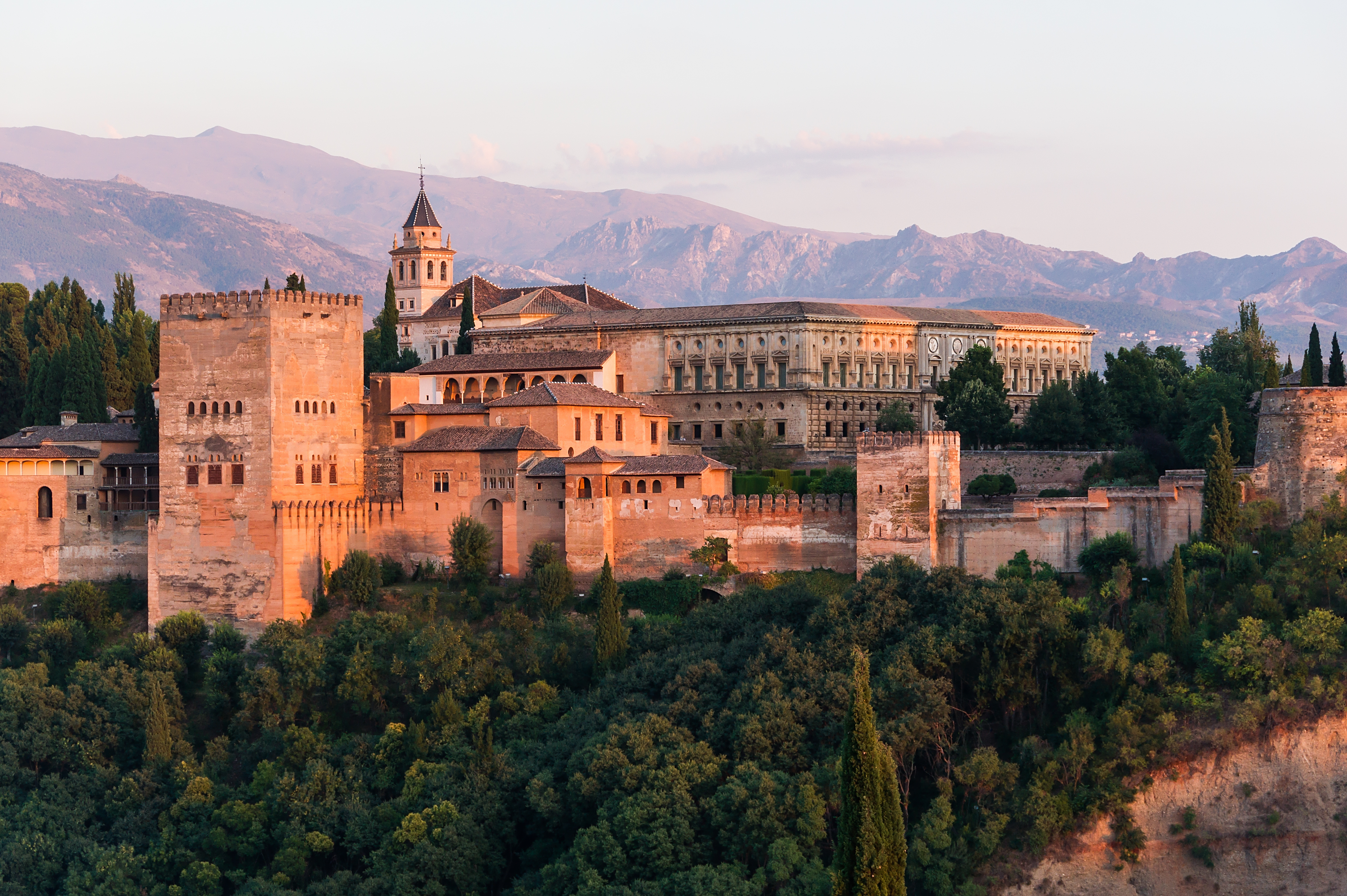
The Alhambra Palace in Granada, a UNESCO World Heritage site since 1984.

==== History of cities in Spain ====
- History of Madrid
- History of Barcelona
- History of Valencia
- History of Toledo
- History of Granada
- History of Seville
- History of León
- History of Bilbao
- History of Zaragoza
- History of Las Palmas
- History of Pamplona
- History of A Coruña
- History of Oviedo
- History of Murcia
- History of Santander
- History of Málaga
- History of Badajoz
- History of Logroño
- History of Girona
- History of Cádiz
- History of Tarragona

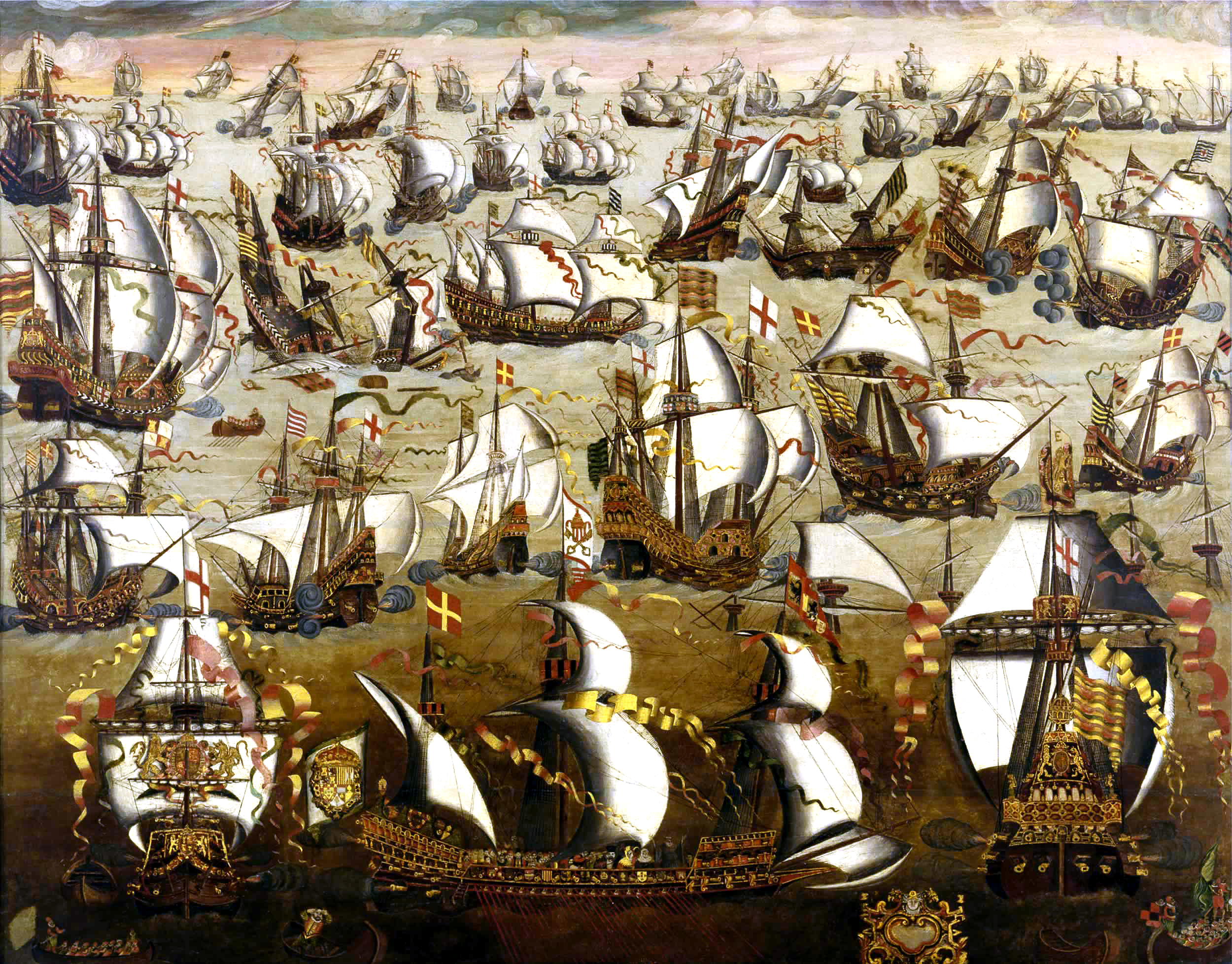
A 16th century painting of the Invincible Armada.

=== History of Spain by subject ===
- Chivalry in Spain
- Economic history of Spain
- Enlightenment in Spain
- History of education in Spain
- History of the far-right in Spain
- History of the Jews in Spain
- Literature in Medieval Spain
- Postal history of Spain
- History of the flags of Spain
- LGBTQ history in Spain
- Military history of Spain
  - Spanish wars
    - Anglo-Spanish Wars
  - Spanish knights orders
  - Galleons of Spain
  - Spanish Armada
    - Spanish Armada in Ireland
    - Ships of the Spanish Armada
- History of rail transport in Spain
- Religious history of Spain
  - History of Roman Catholicism in Spain
    - History of the Catholic Church in Spain
- History of science and technology in Spain
- Slavery in Spain
  - Abolition of slavery in Spain

== Culture of Spain ==
Culture of Spain

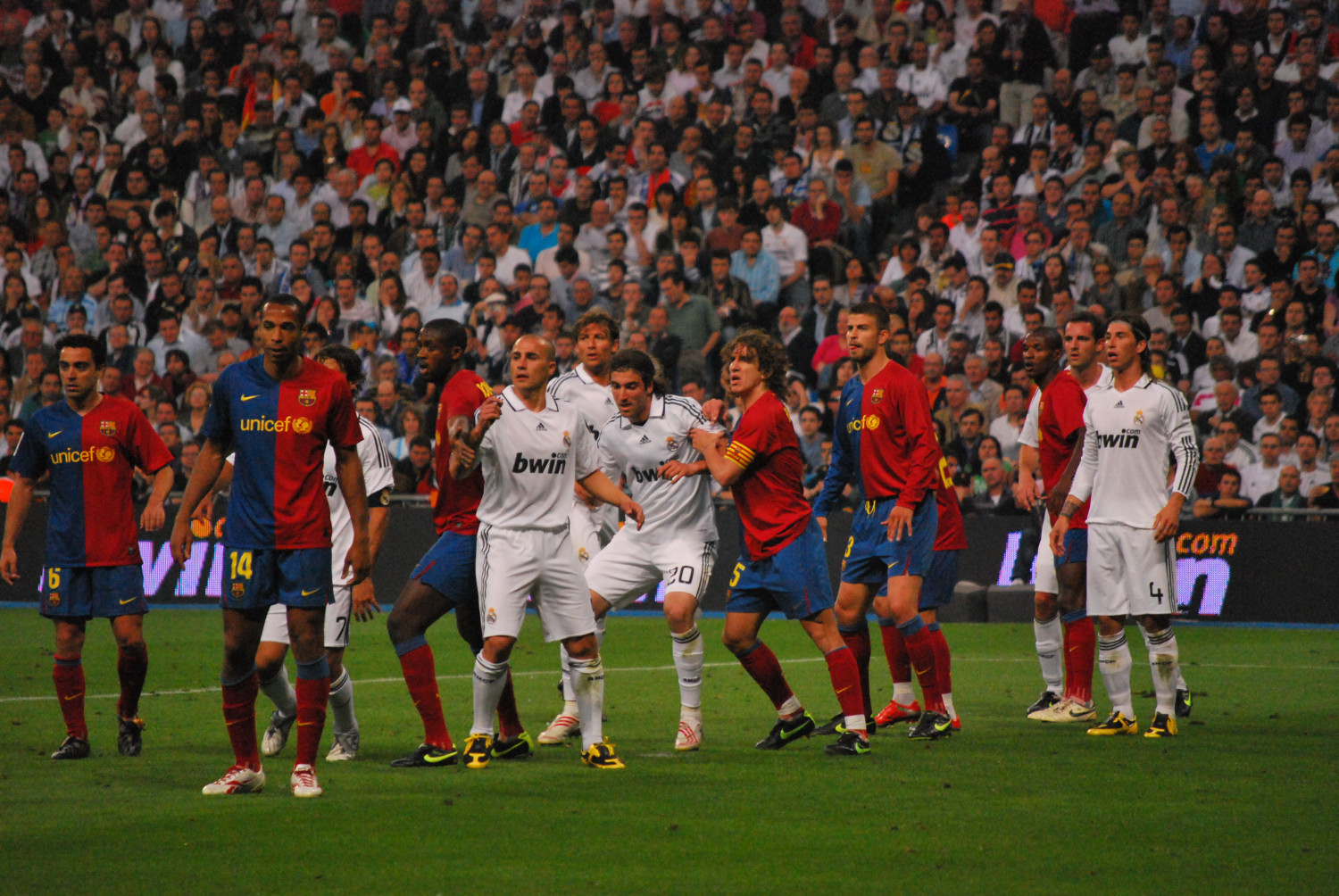
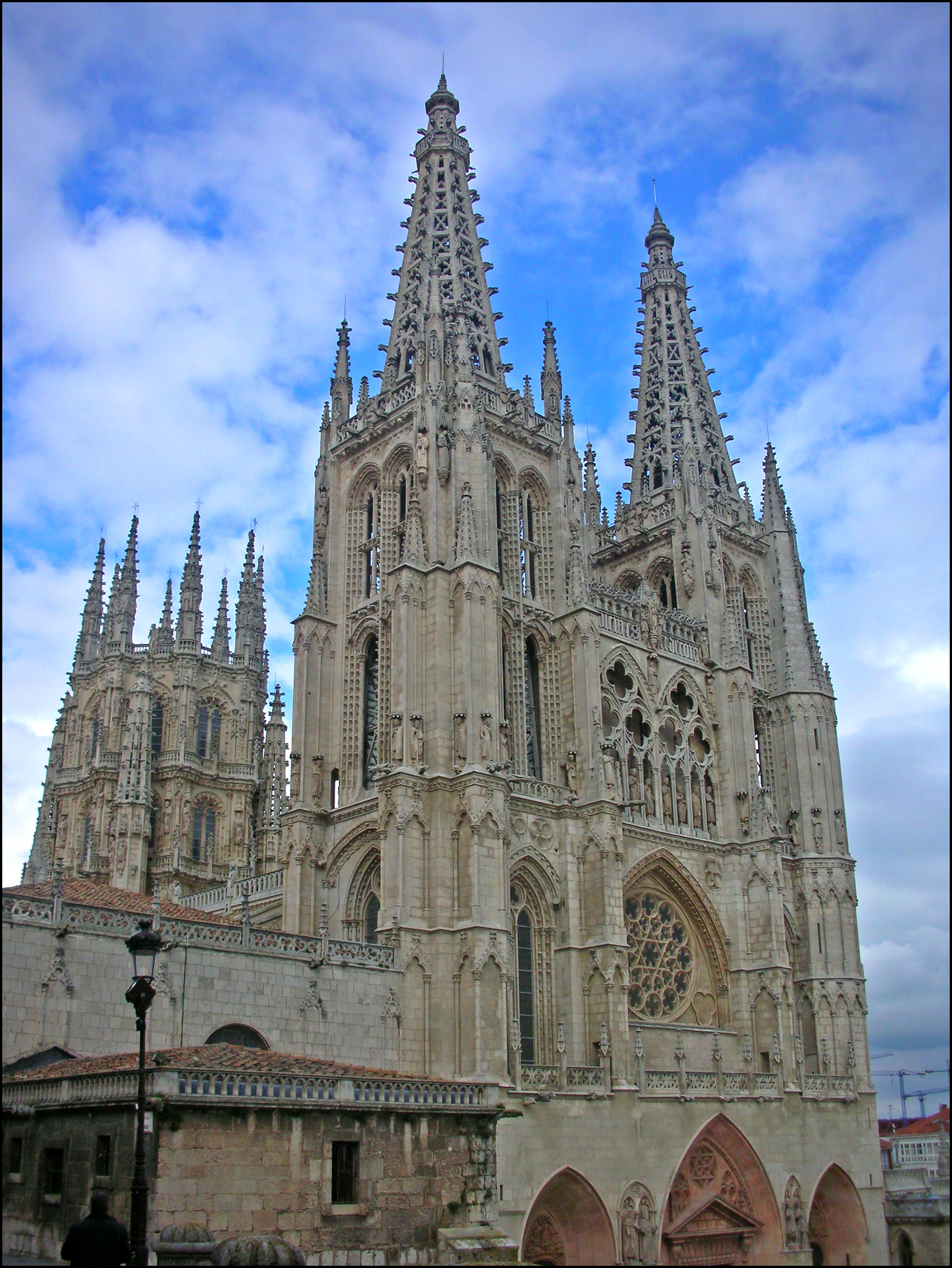
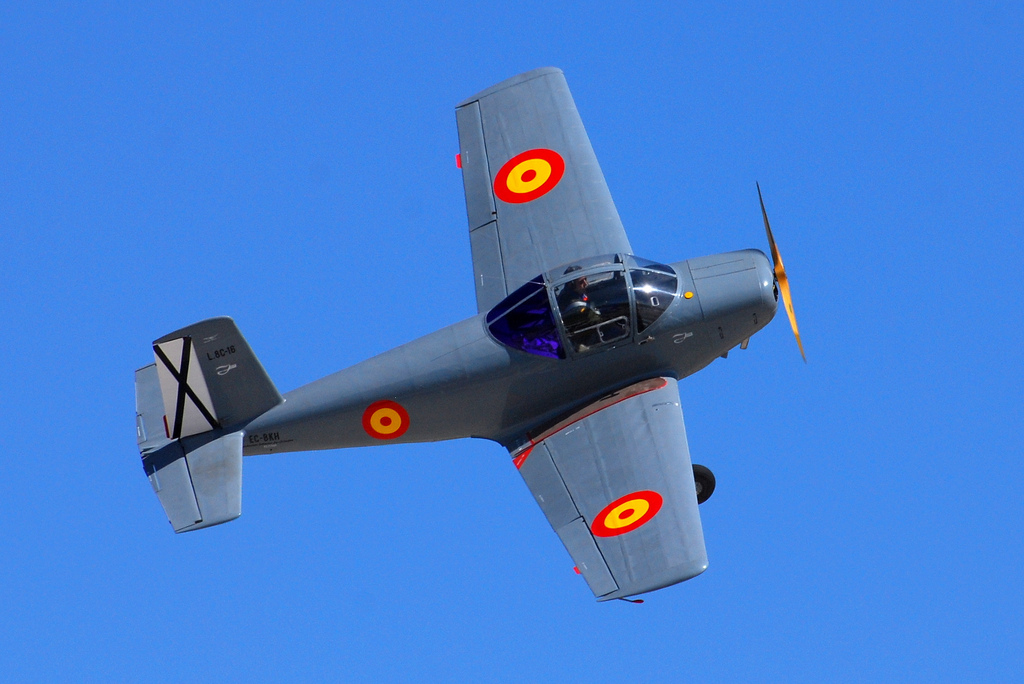
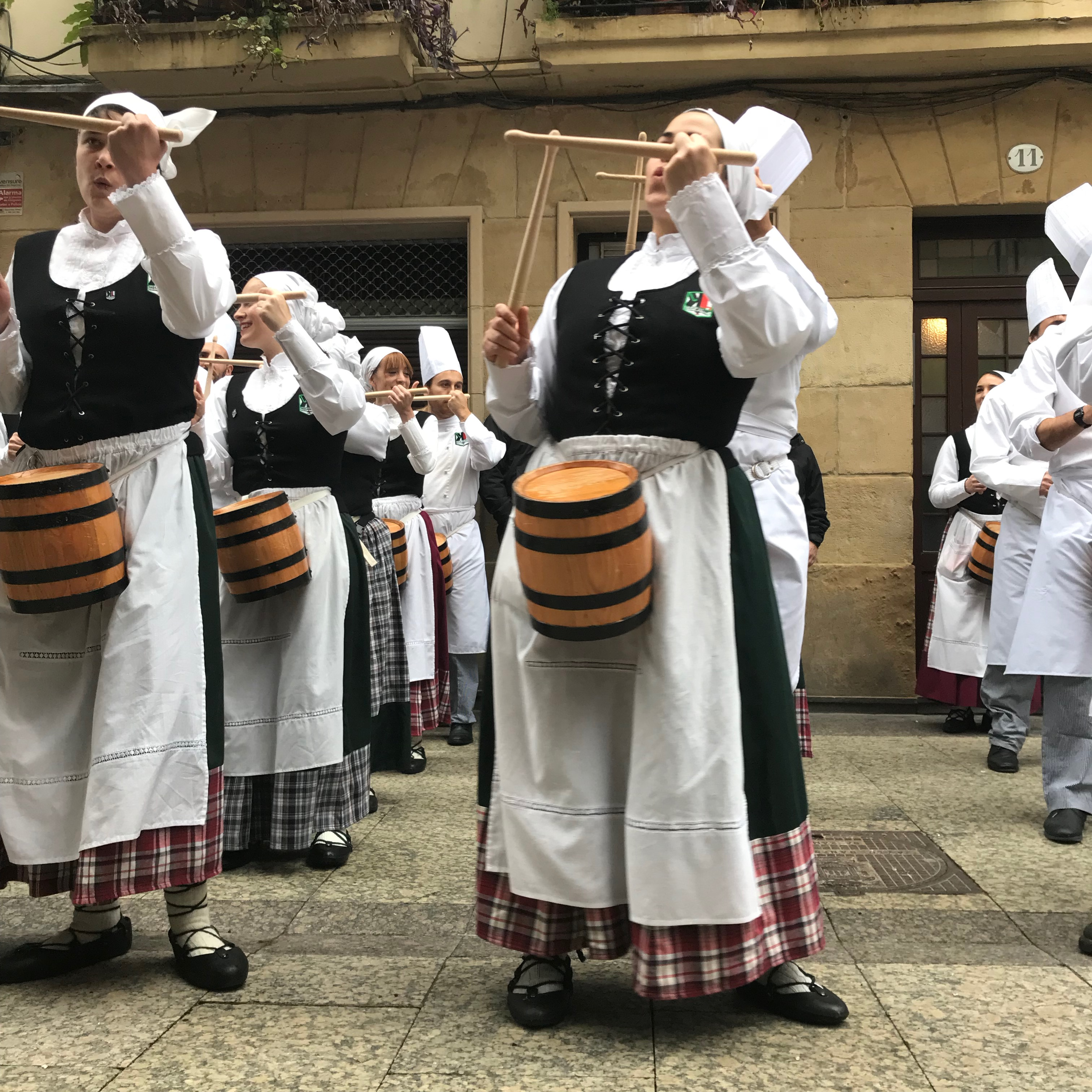
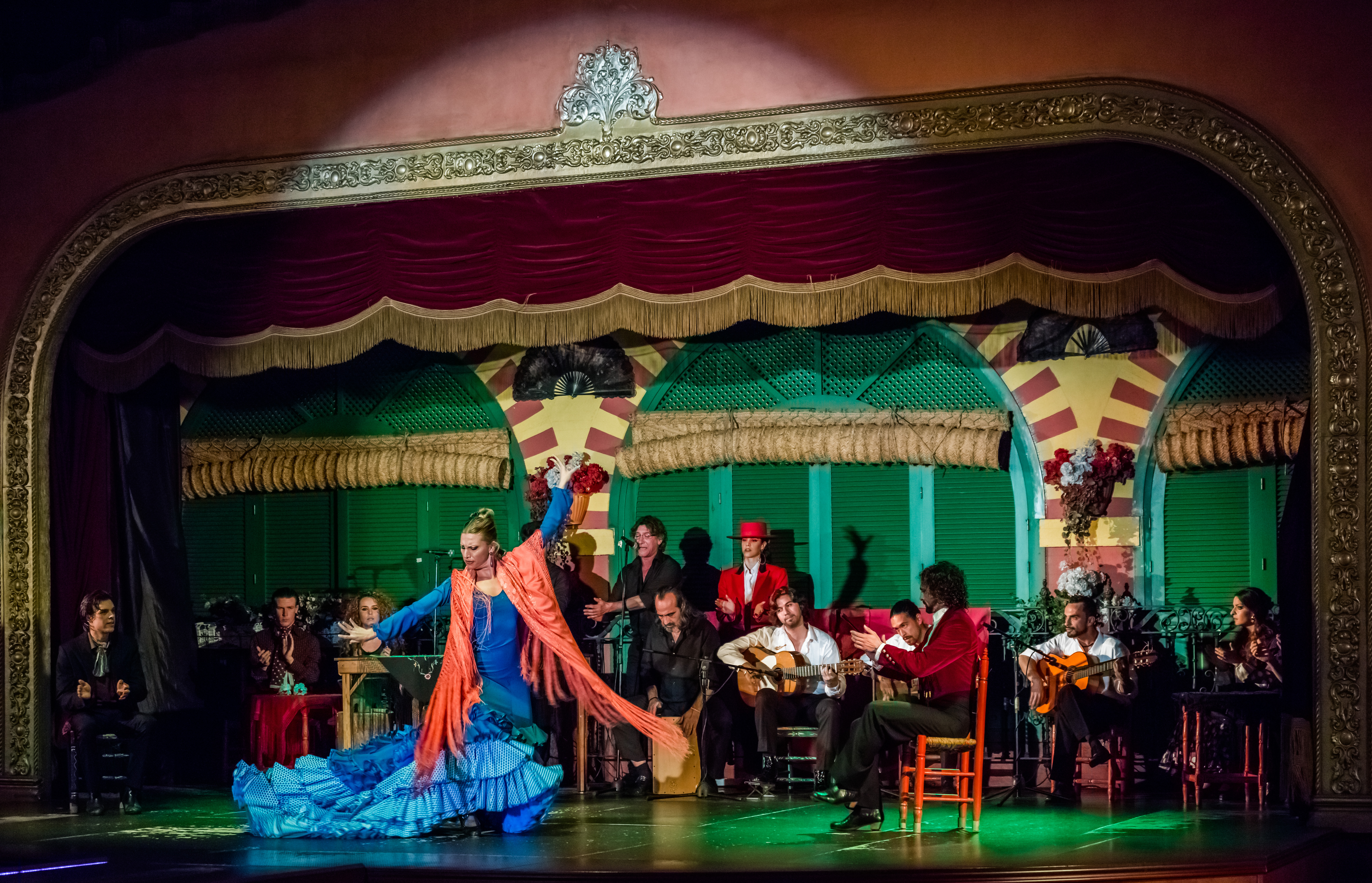
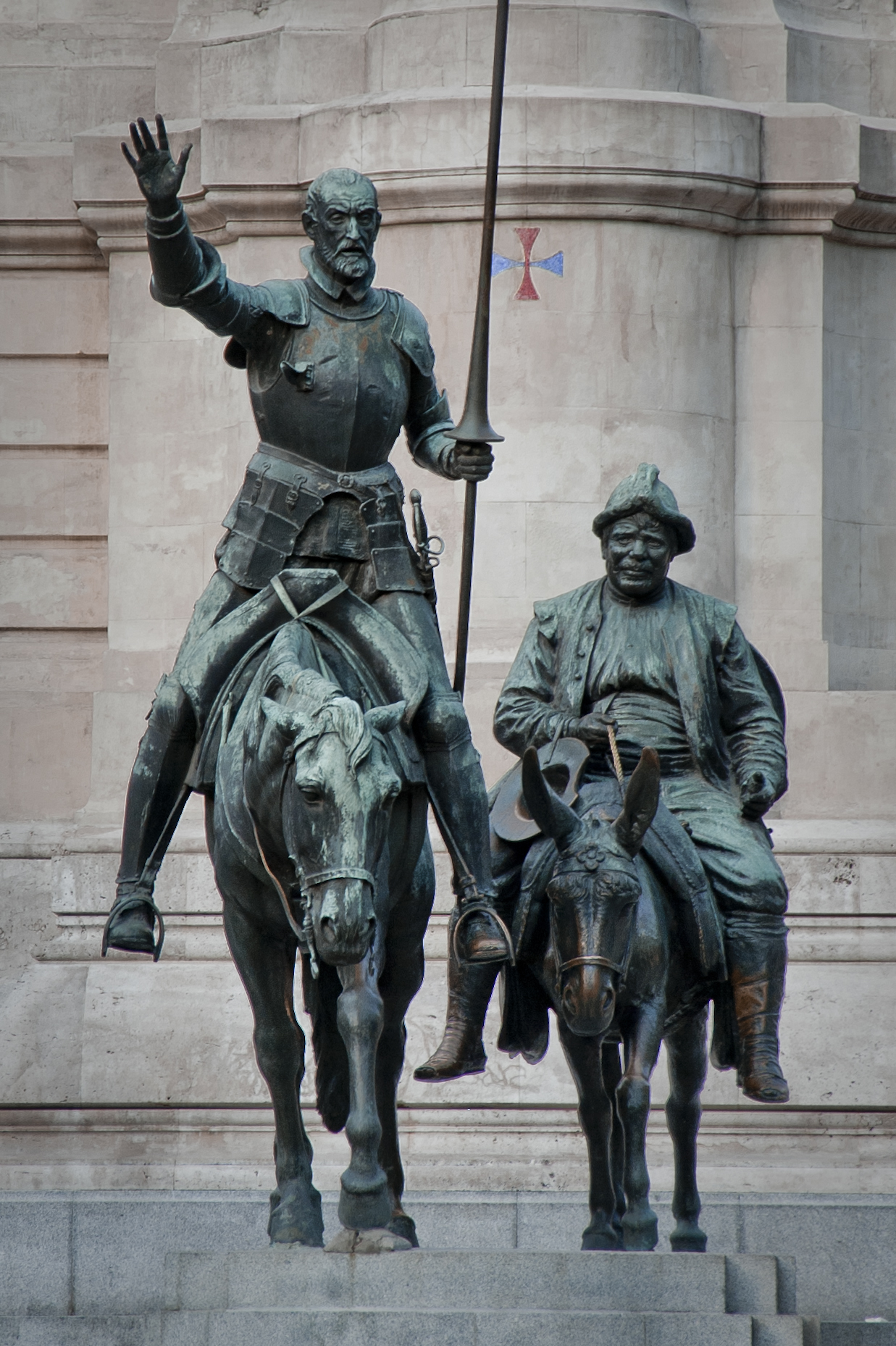
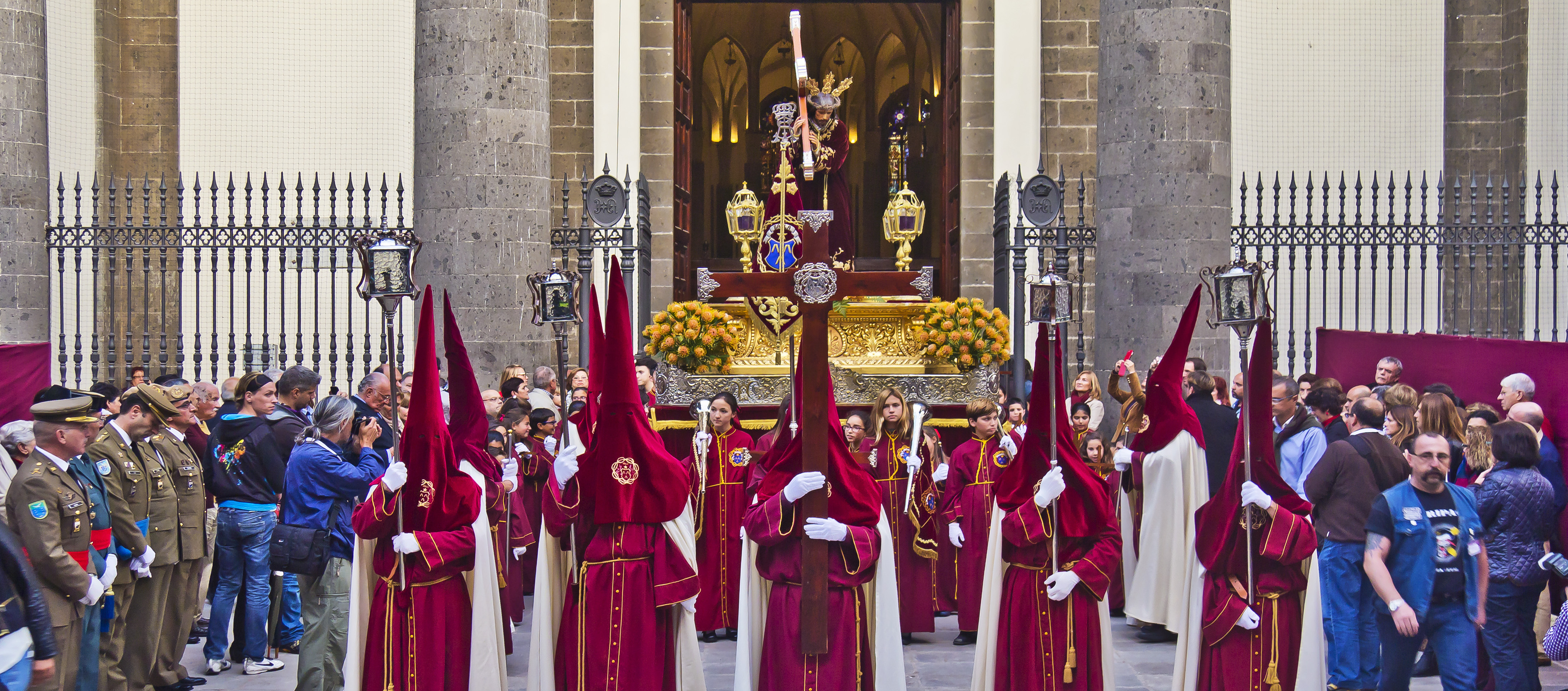
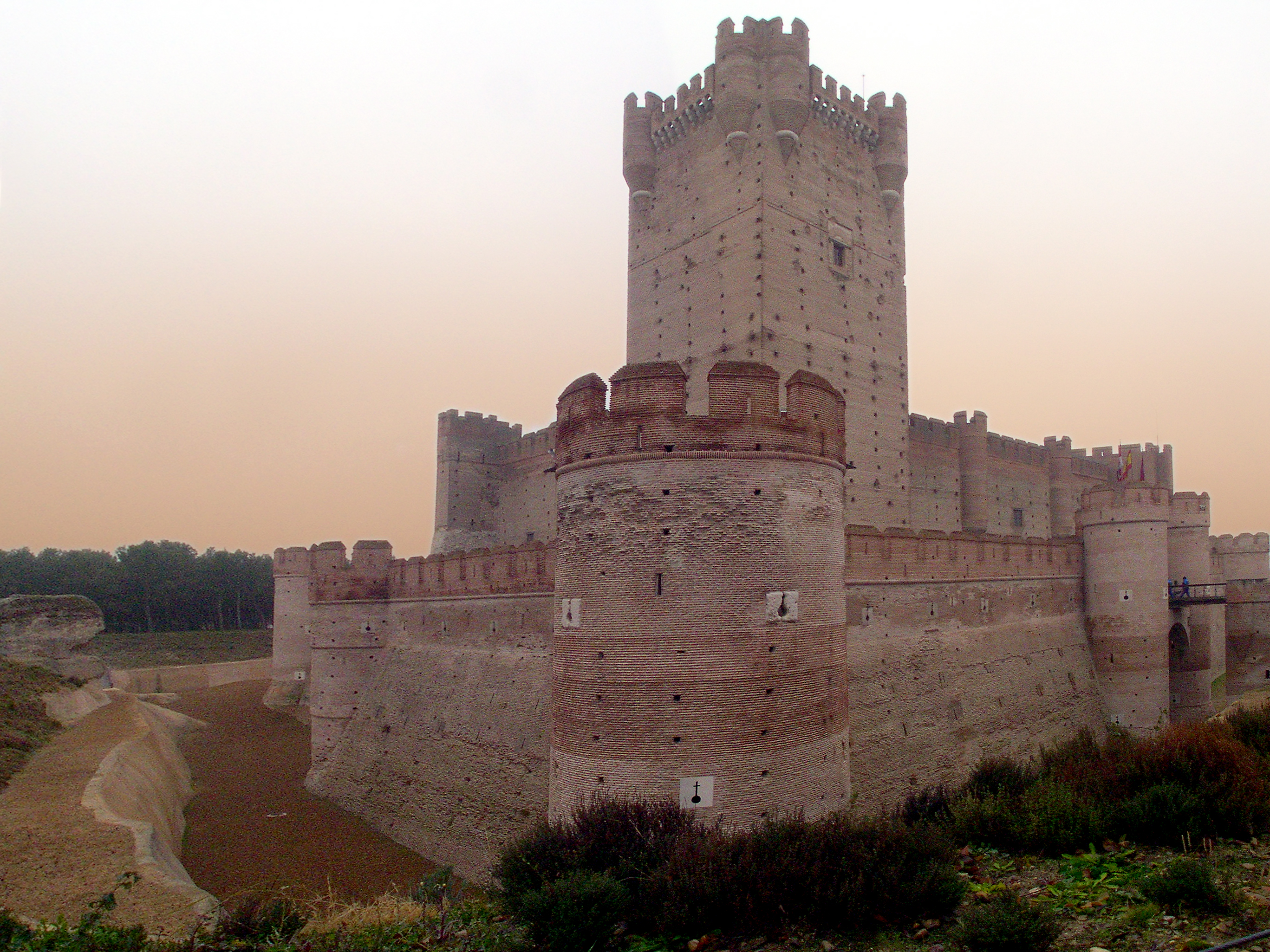
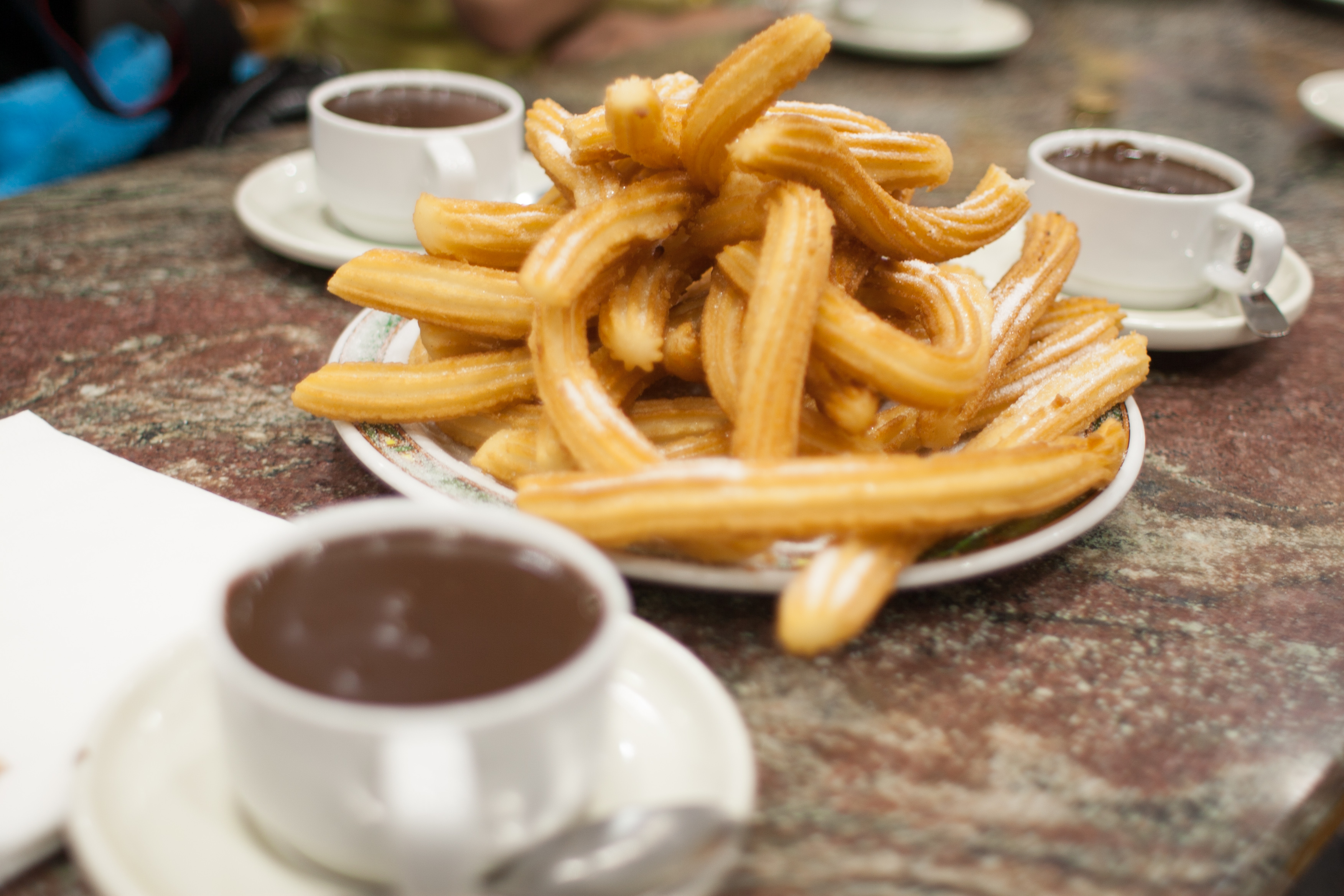

- Aztec influence in Spain
- Time in Spain
  - Date and time notation in Spain
- Gardening in Spain
- Festivals in Spain
  - Fiestas of International Tourist Interest of Spain
  - Fiestas of National Tourist Interest of Spain
- Freemasonry in Spain
- Folklore of Spain
- Heraldry in Spain
- Media in Spain
- National Prizes awarded by the Ministry of Culture
- National monuments of Spain
- Museums in Spain
- Propaganda in Spain
- Postage stamps of Spain
- Public holidays in Spain
  - Labor Day in Spain
  - National Day of Spain
- Records of Spain
- Scouting in Spain
- Sites of cultural significance in Spain:
  - Sites of Community Importance in Spain
  - World Heritage Sites in Spain
  - Bienes de Interés Cultural
- Scouting and Guiding in Spain
- Tourism in Spain
  - 2024 anti-tourism protests in Spain
  - Made in Spain
- UFO sightings in Spain
- Video games in Spain
- Windmills of Spain

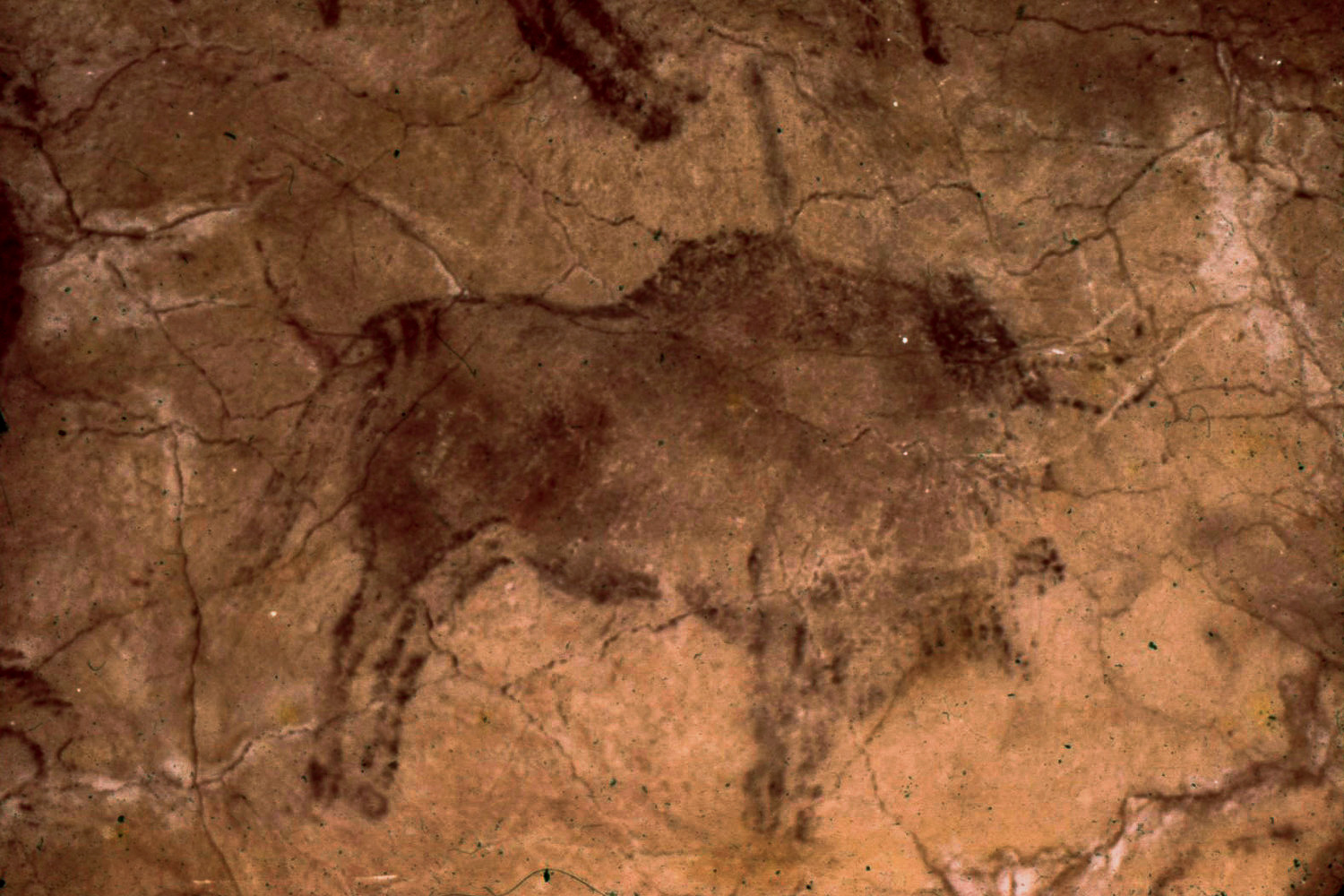
A bison in the cave of Altamira.

=== Art in Spain ===
Art in Spain

- Cave of Altamira
  - Cave of Altamira and Paleolithic Cave Art of Northern Spain
- Rock art of the Iberian Mediterranean Basin
- Television in Spain
  - Spanish television series
- Spanish Golden Age
- Spanish Baroque Painting
- Spanish Renaissance
- Art and culture in Francoist Spain

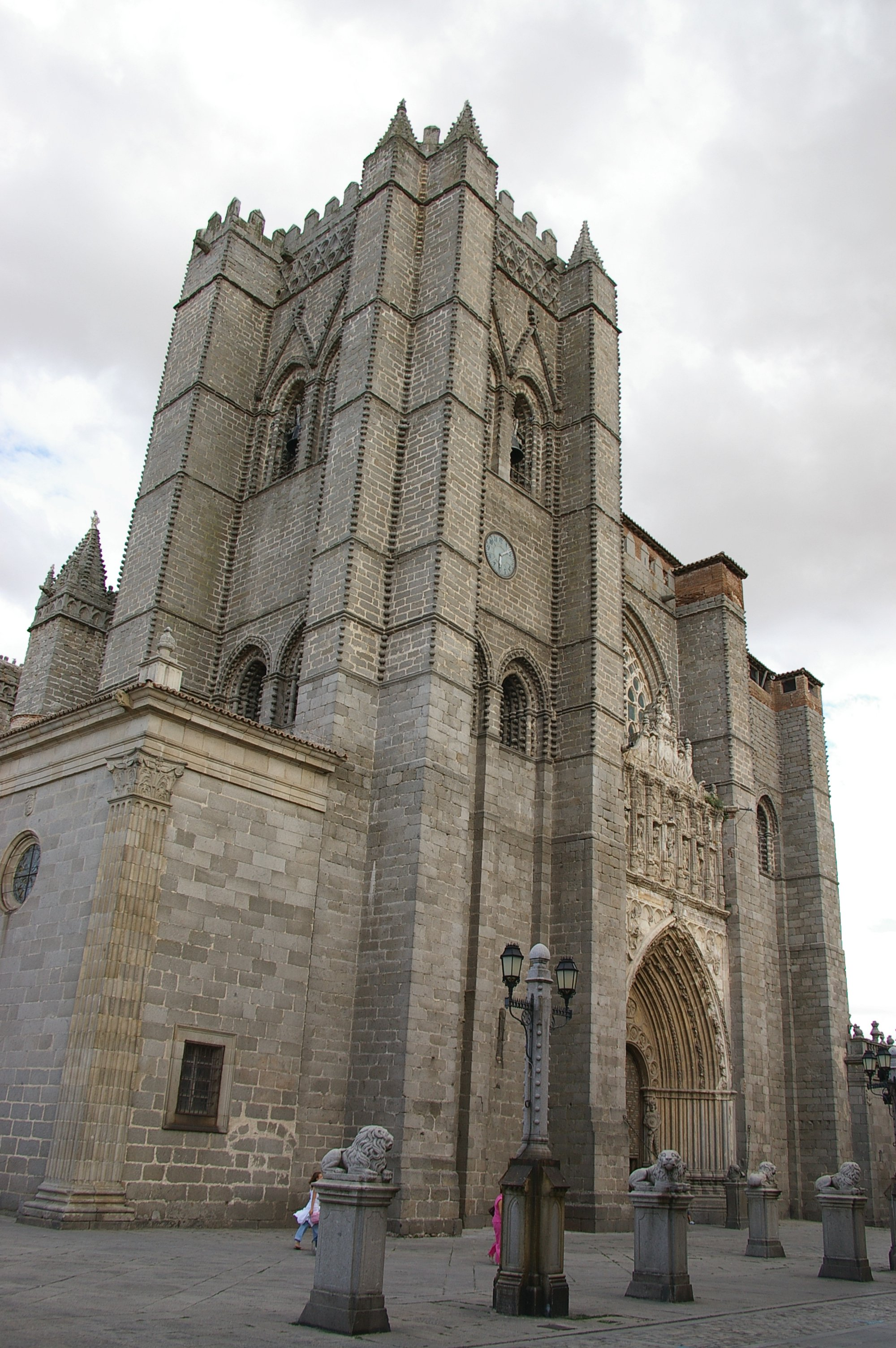
The Ávila cathedral's main view

==== Architecture of Spain ====
Architecture of Spain

- By location
  - Architecture of Barcelona
  - Architecture of Madrid
    - Romanesque churches in Madrid
  - Architecture of Cantabria
- By period
  - Spanish Romanesque
  - Mudéjar style
  - Spanish Gothic architecture
  - Herrerian
  - Purism
  - Spanish Renaissance architecture
  - Plateresque
  - Spanish Baroque
  - Rococo in Spain
  - Modernisme
- By type
  - Castles in Spain
  - Cathedrals in Spain
- Spanish architects
- Missing landmarks in Spain
- Submerged places in Spain

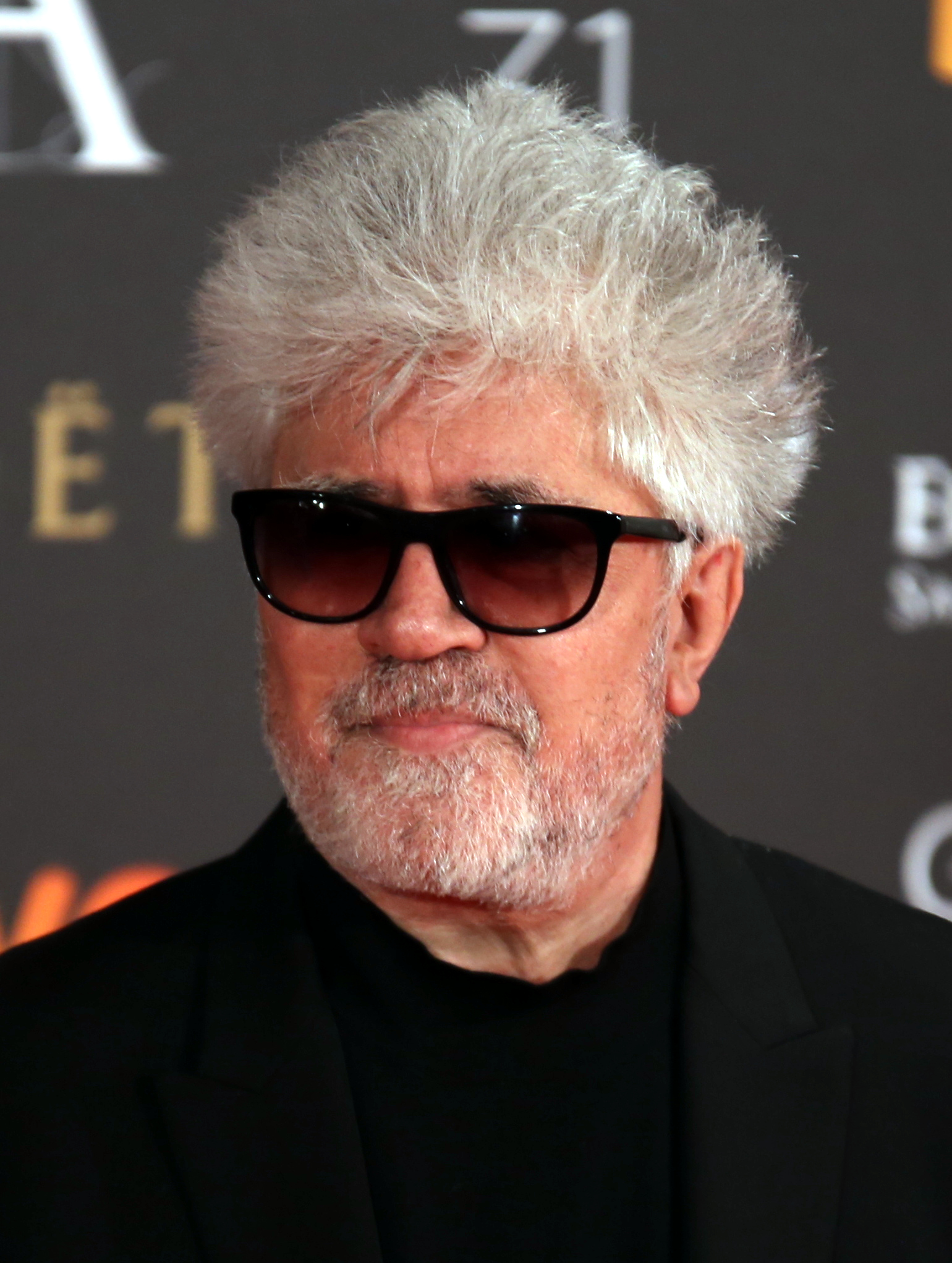
Pedro Almódovar at the Premios Goya

==== Cinema of Spain ====
Cinema of Spain

- Spanish films
- Spanish directors
  - Luis Buñuel – first Spanish director to achieve universal recognition
  - Pedro Almodóvar – achieved universal recognition in the 1980s
  - Segundo de Chomón
  - Florián Rey
  - Luis García Berlanga
  - Juan Antonio Bardem
  - Carlos Saura
  - Julio Médem
  - Alejandro Amenábar
- Goya Awards

==== Dance in Spain ====
- Jota
- Flamenco
- Sardana
- Sevillanas

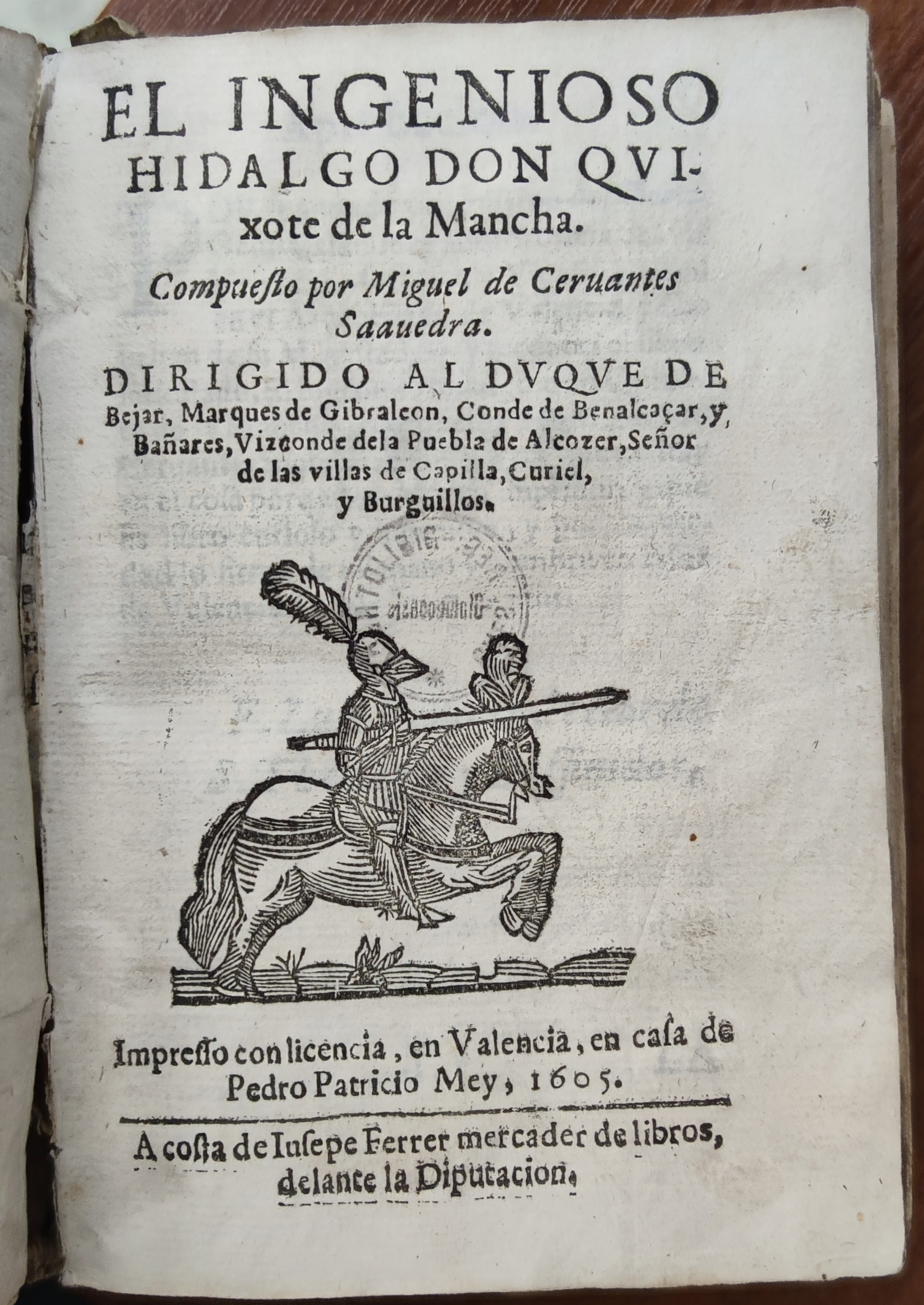
The first edition of the book of Don Quixote, printed in 1605, one of the most well known pieces of Spanish literature.

==== Literature of Spain ====
Literature of Spain — Castilian (Spanish) literature

- Books in Spain
  - Libraries in Spain
- By genre
  - LGBTQ literature in Spain
  - Spanish poetry
    - Women's poetry in Spain
  - Spanish comics
- By region
  - Basque literature
  - Catalan literature
  - Galician literature
- By author
  - Miguel de Cervantes
  - Federico García Lorca
  - Lope de Vega

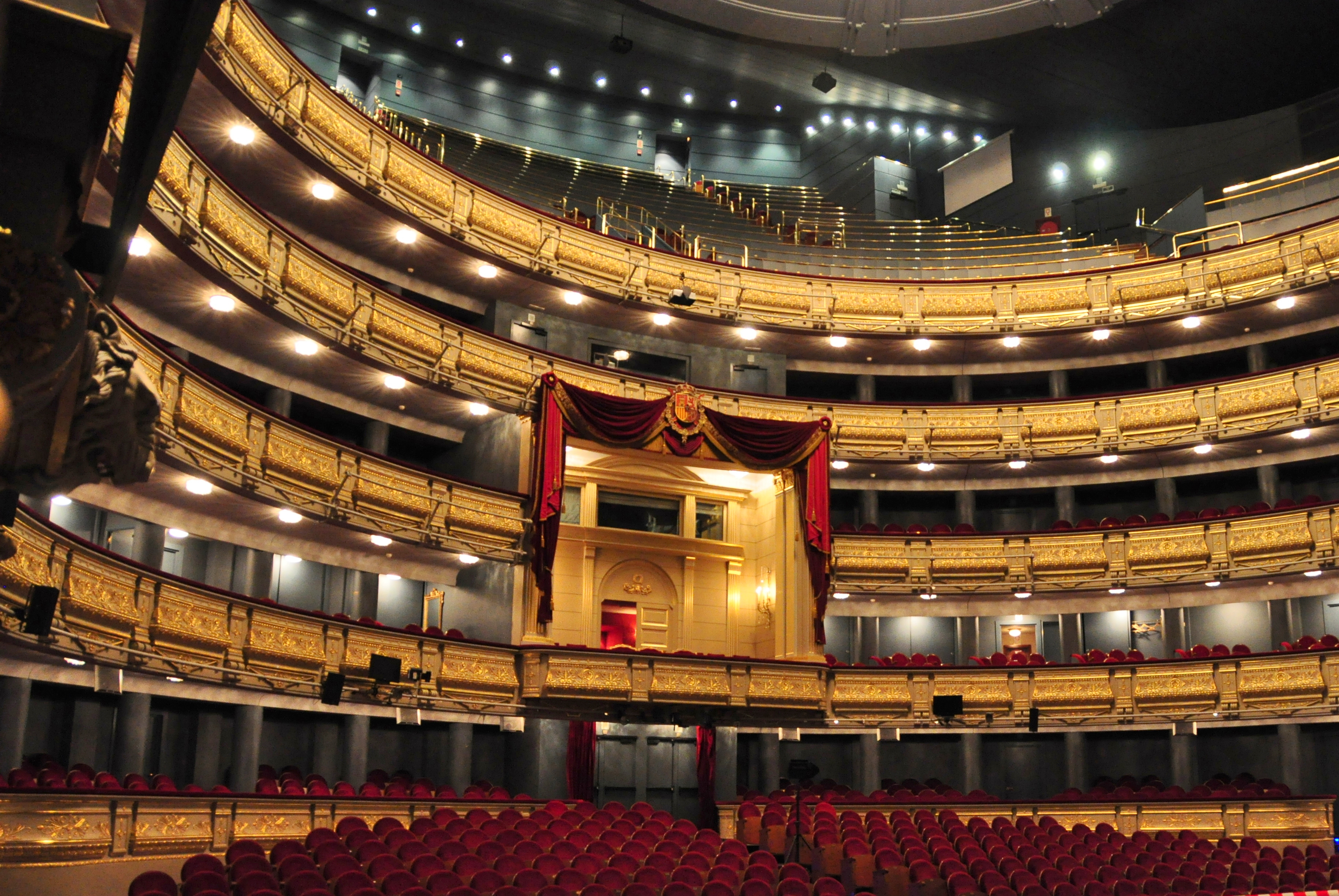
View of the Teatro Real from the main stage

==== Music of Spain ====
Music of Spain

- By genre:
  - Spanish opera
    - Teatro Real
  - Spanish folk music
  - Flamenco
  - Catalan rumba
  - Spanish rock
    - Punk rock in Spain
  - Spanish hip hop
- By region:
  - Music of Andalusia
  - Music of Aragon
  - Music of the Balearic Islands
  - Music of the Basque
  - Music of the Canary Islands
  - Music of Castile, Madrid and León
  - Music of Catalonia
  - Music of Extremadura
  - Music of Galicia, Cantabria and Asturias
  - Music of Murcia
  - Music of Navarre and La Rioja
  - Music of Valencia
- Chronologically:
  - Spanish classical composers chronologically
- By name:
  - Spanish composers
  - Spanish musicians
  - Spanish bands
- Benidorm International Song Festival
- Spain in the Eurovision Song Contest
  - 1969 Eurovision Song Contest

One of the most know work of art in Spain, Las Meninas by Diego Velázquez.

==== Painting in Spain ====
- Spanish painters
  - By name
    - Alonso Cano
    - Juan Carreño de Miranda
    - Ramon Casas i Carbó
    - Claudio Coello
    - Salvador Dalí
    - Mariano Fortuny
    - Francisco Goya
    - El Greco (born in Creta).
    - Bartolomé Esteban Murillo
    - Pablo Picasso
    - José de Ribera
    - Santiago Rusiñol
    - Enrique Simonet
    - Joaquín Sorolla
    - Diego Velázquez
    - Ignacio Zuloaga
    - Francisco de Zurbarán
    - María Blanchard
    - Ángeles Santos
  - By period
    - Medieval Spanish artists (born 1300–1500)
    - Modern Spanish artists (born 1500–1800)
    - Contemporary Spanish artists (born 1800 onwards)

==== Sculpture in Spain ====
- Lady of Elche
- Lady of Baza
- El Oso y el Madroño
- Spanish sculptors
  - Mariano Benlliure

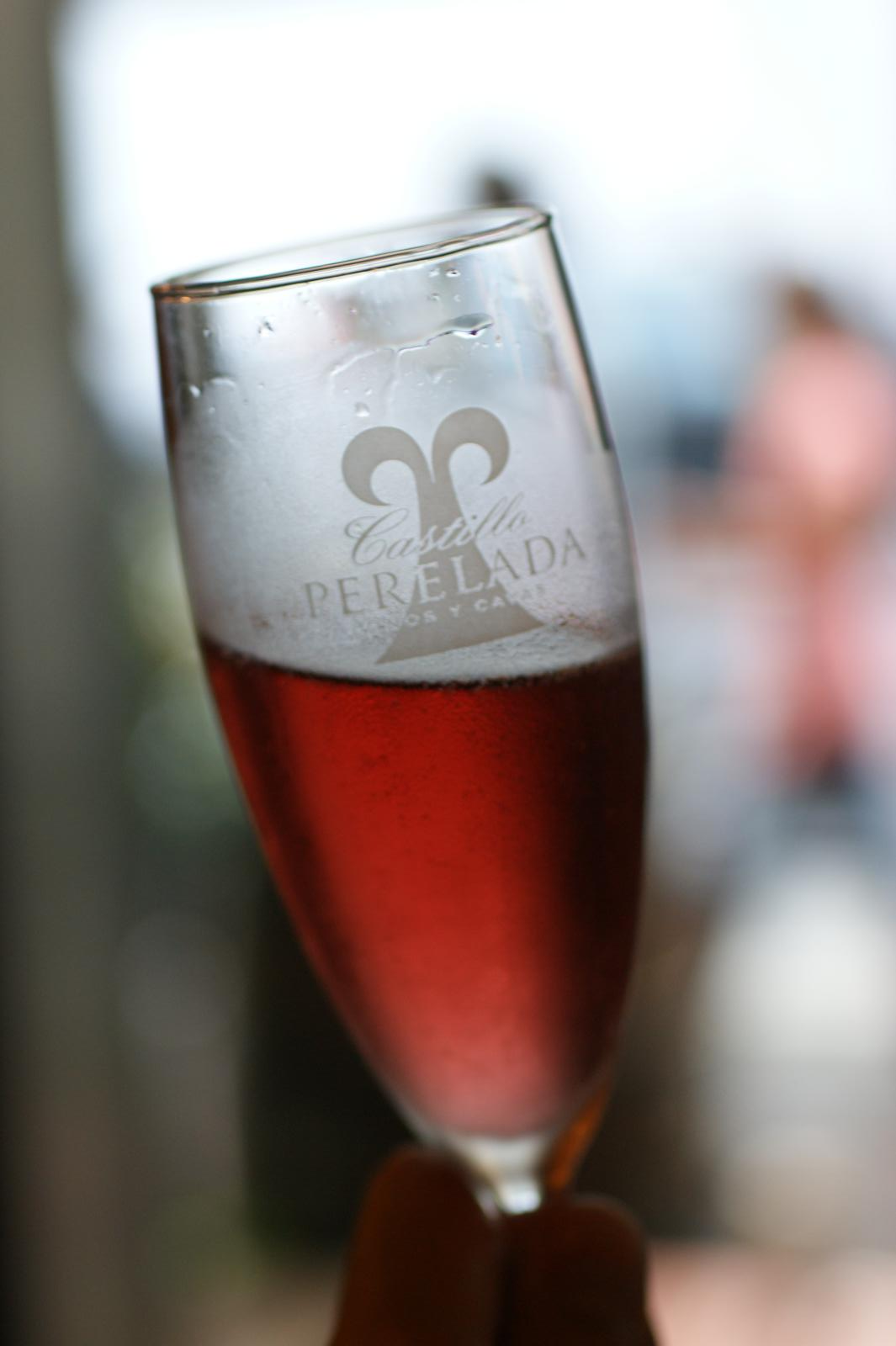
A glass of Cava wine

=== Cuisine in Spain ===
Cuisine of Spain

- Spanish dishes
  - Paella
    - Arròs negre, also called Paella negra
  - Spanish tortilla
  - Spanish soups and stews
    - Cocido
      - Cocido madrileño
      - Cocido lebaniego
      - Cocido montañés
- Cava wine
- Spanish breads
- Spanish cheeses
- Spanish desserts

=== Language in Spain ===
Enlargeable map showing the languages spoken in Spain.

Languages of Spain

- Spanish language
  - History of the Spanish language
    - Language policies of Francoist Spain
    - Influence of Arabic on Spanish
    - Comparison of Portuguese and Spanish
  - Spanish dialects
    - Andalusian Spanish
    - Aragonese
    - Leonese
    - Murcian
    - Asturian
  - Official languages of Spain
    - Aranese (Occitan)
    - Basque
    - Catalan
    - Galician
    - Valencian

=== National symbols of Spain ===
National symbols of Spain

- Coat of arms of Spain
  - Coats of arms of the autonomous communities of Spain
  - Coat of arms of the King of Spain
  - Coat of arms of the Prince of Spain
- Cockade of Spain
- Flags of Spain
  - Flag of Spain
  - Flags of the autonomous communities of Spain
- National anthem of Spain (Marcha Real)
  - Anthems of the autonomous communities of Spain
- National motto: Plus Ultra
  - A solis ortu usque ad occasum, a secondary motto.
  - ¡Santiago, y cierra España!

=== People of Spain ===
Map of the spanish people throughout the world.

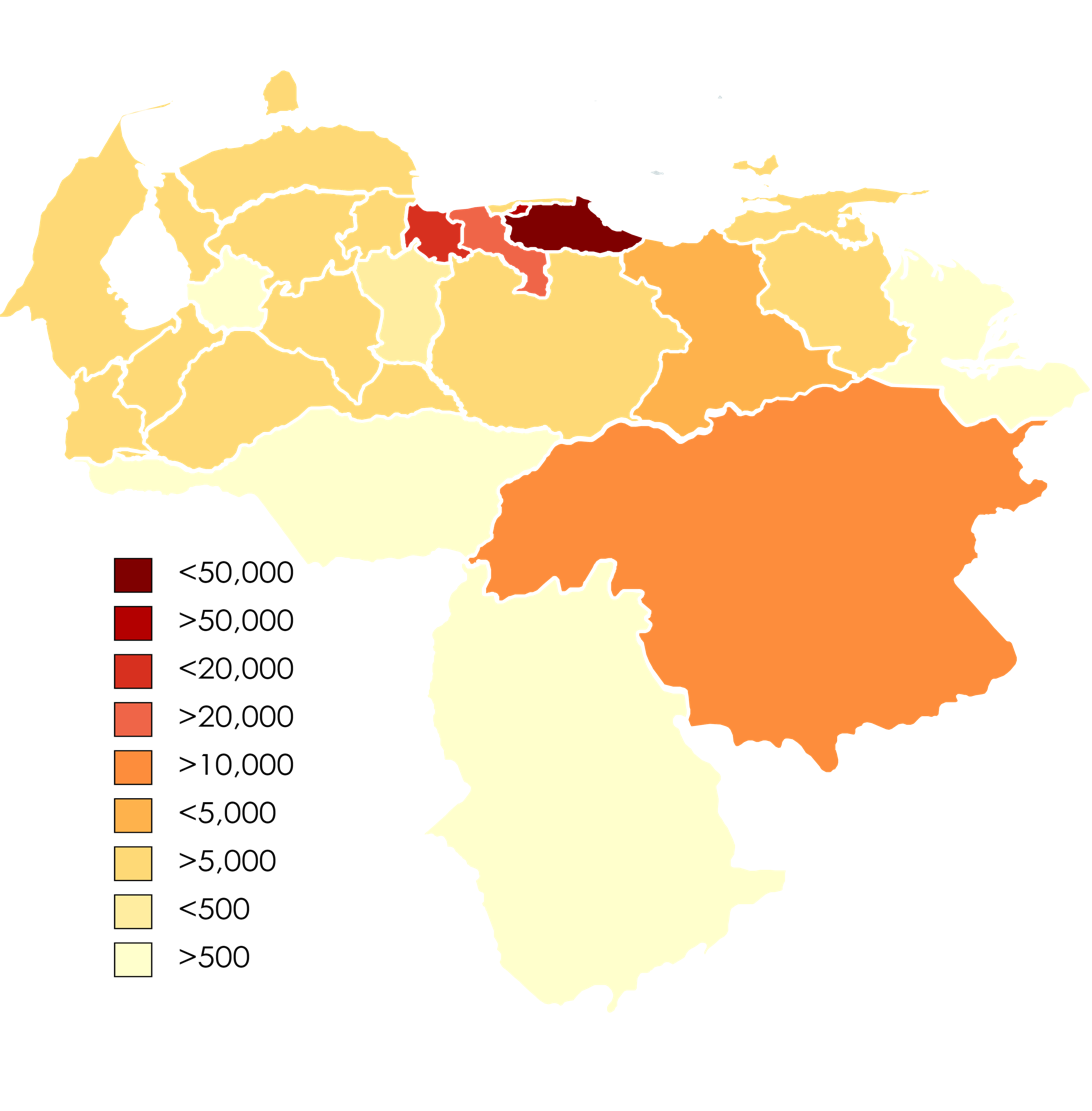
Spaniards in Venezuela by state.

Spanish people

- Spanish billionaires
- Women in Spain

==== Regional ethnic groups in Spain ====
- Andalusian people
- Aragonese people
- Asturian people
- Balearic people
- Basque people
- Canarian people
- Cantabrian people
- Castilian people
- Catalan people
- Extremaduran people
- Galician people
- Leonese people
- Valencian people

==== Other groups in Spain ====
- Afro-Spanish
- Algerians in Spain
- Arabs in Spain
- Argentines in Spain
- Armenians in Spain
- Bulgarians in Spain
- Chinese people in Spain
- Colombians in Spain
- Dominicans in Spain
- Ecuadorians in Spain
- Indians in Spain
- Iranians in Spain
- Italians in Spain
- Japanese people in Spain
- Jews in Spain
- Koreans in Spain
- Lebanese people in Spain
- Moroccans in Spain
- Pakistanis in Spain
- Paraguayans in Spain
- Peruvians in Spain
- Poles in Spain
- Romani people in Spain
- Romanians in Spain
- Russians in Spain
- Sahrawis in Spain
- Serbs in Spain
- Turks in Spain
- Uruguayans in Spain
- Venezuelans in Spain

Graphic comparing growth of catholicism (red) and non-religion (green) in Spain from 2005 to 2010.

=== Religion and belief systems in Spain ===
Religion in Spain

- Irreligion in Spain
- Bahá'í Faith in Spain
- Buddhism in Spain
- Hinduism in Spain
- Islam in Spain
  - Ahmadiyya in Spain
  - Forced conversions of Muslims in Spain
- Judaism in Spain
  - Golden Age of Jewish culture in Spain
- Paganism in Spain
- Odinist Community of Spain – Ásatrú
- Sikhism in Spain

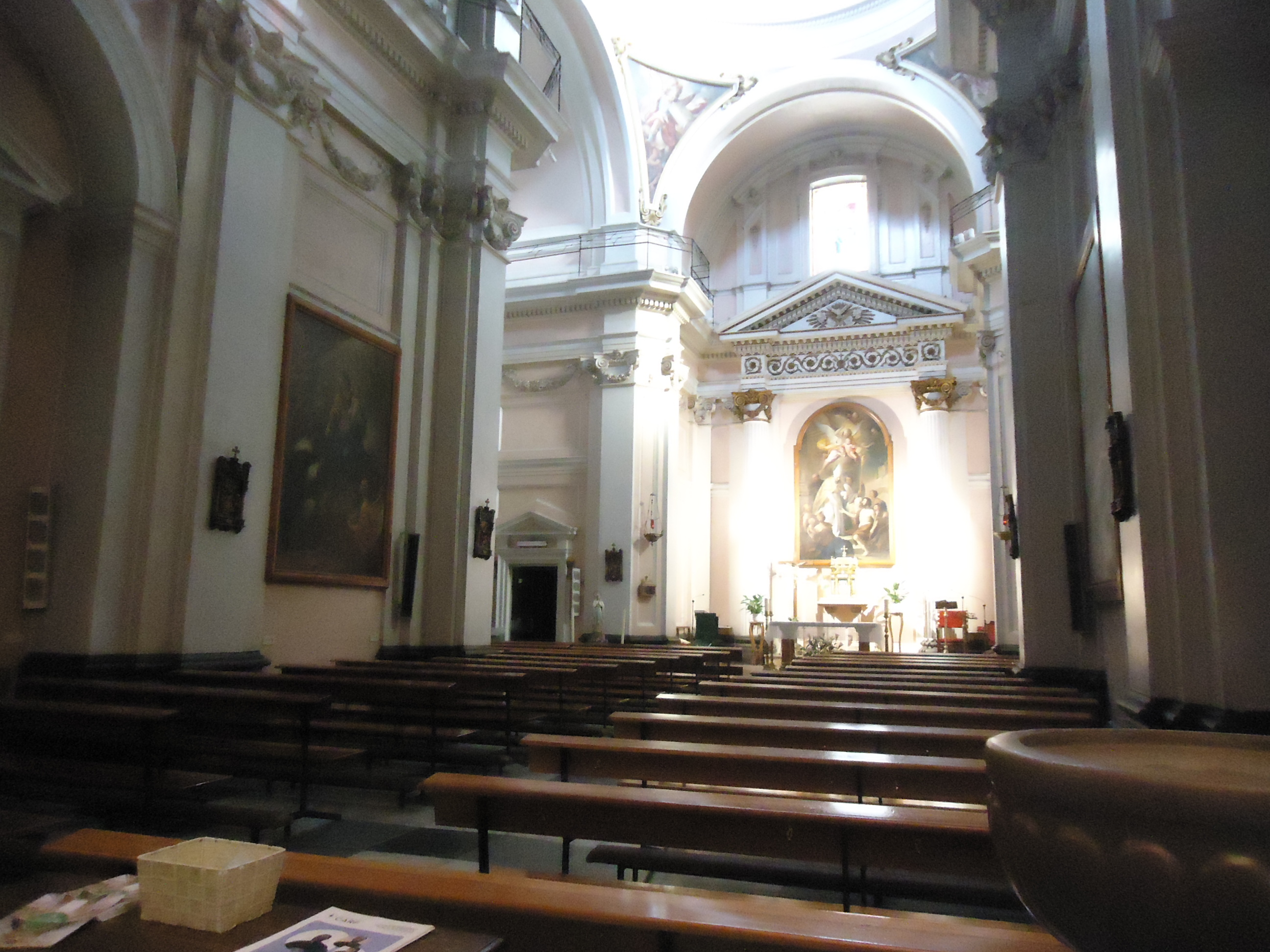
The inside of a church in Benicàssim, Castelló de la Plana, Valencian Community.

==== Christianity in Spain ====
Christianity in Spain

- Anglicanism in Spain
- Bible translations into Spanish
  - Hijas de Jesús
  - Opus Dei
  - Catholicism in Spain
    - Apostolic Nuncio to Spain
    - Christmas in Spain
    - Martyrs of Spain
      - Martyrs of the Spanish Civil War
        - 233 Spanish Martyrs
        - 498 Spanish Martyrs
        - 522 Spanish Martyrs
    - Catholicisim in the Second Spanish Republic
- Protestantism in Spain
  - Federation of Evangelical Religious Entities of Spain
- Eastern Orthodoxy in Spain
- Monasteries in Spain
- Cathedrals in Spain

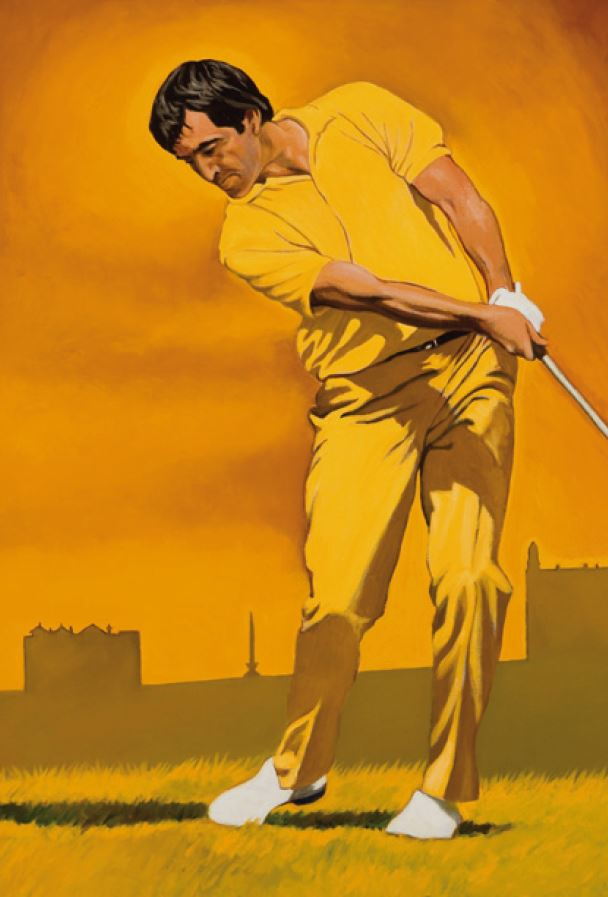
A painting of Seve Ballesteros

=== Sports in Spain ===
Sport in Spain

- Spanish sportspeople
- Baseball in Spain
- Basketball in Spain
- Basque pelota
- Cycling in Spain
- Chess in Spain
  - Spanish chess players
  - Spanish Chess Championship
- Disabled sports in Spain
- Golf in Spain
  - Severiano Ballesteros
  - Open de Madrid
- Handball in Spain
- Ice hockey in Spain
- Ice skating in Spain
- ISU Junior Grand Prix in Spain
- Lacrosse in Spain
- Spain at the Olympics
  - Olympic Games in 1992
- Tennis in Spain
  - Royal Spanish Tennis Federation
    - Rafael Nadal
    - Carlos Alcaraz
- Racing in Spain
  - Auto racing in Spain
    - Formula 1 in Spain
      - Spanish Grand Prix
  - Motorcycle racing in Spain
    - Spanish motorcycle Grand Prix

==== Football in Spain ====
Football in Spain

- Futsal in Spain
- Football records in Spain
- Men's football clubs in Spain
- Women's football clubs in Spain
- Spain international footballers
  - Spain national football team
    - History of the Spain national football team
    - Spain at the FIFA World Cup
    - Spain women's national football team
- Women's football in Spain
  - Women's football clubs in Spain
  - Spain women's national football team

== Economy and infrastructure of Spain ==
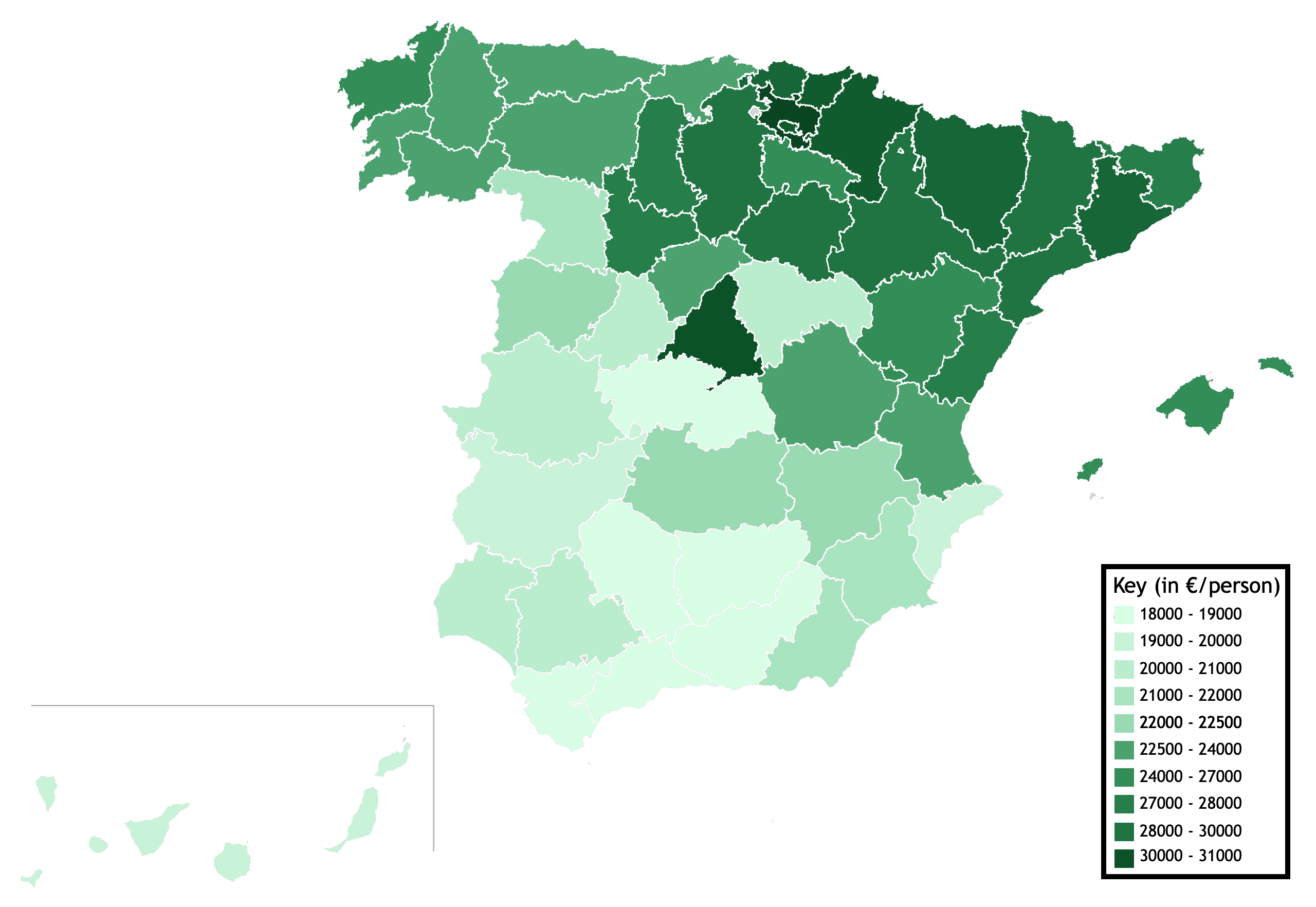
A map of the provinces of Spain, comparing the GDP of these.

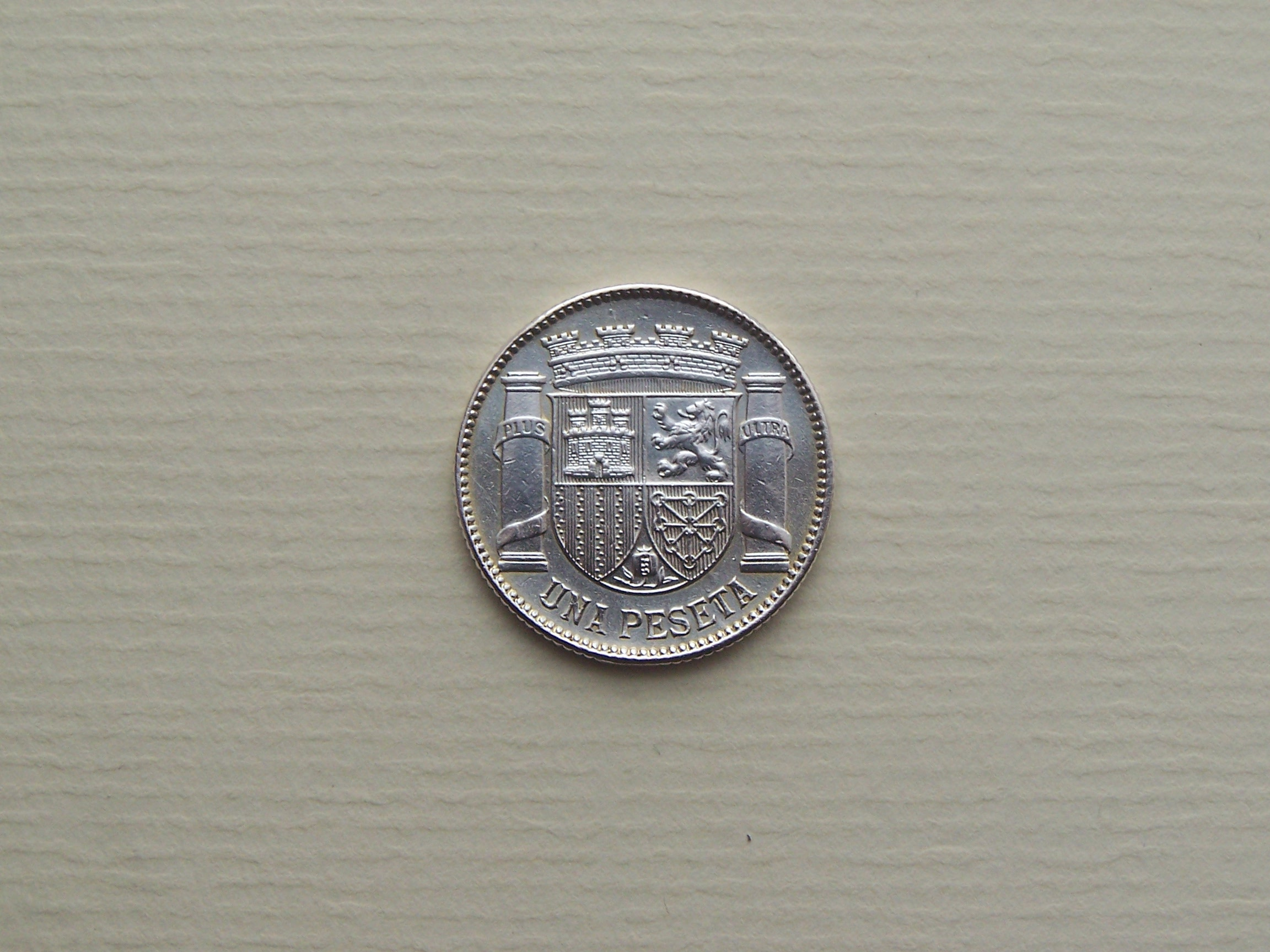
A Spanish peseta from 1933.

Economy of Spain

- Economic rank, by nominal GDP (2024): 15th
- Archives in Spain
- Agriculture in Spain
- Banking in Spain
  - Bank of Spain
  - Banks of Spain
    - BBVA
    - Santander
- Bridges of Spain
- Lighthouses of Spain
- Companies of Spain
- Commercial fishing in Spain
- Currency of Spain: Euro (see also: Euro topics)
  - ISO 4217: EUR
  - Royal Mint
    - Spanish euro coins
    - Spanish peseta
    - Commemorative coins of Spain
      - Euro gold and silver commemorative coins (Spain)
- Decline of Spain
- Ensanche
- Economic history of Spain
- Energy in Spain
  - Electricity sector in Spain
  - Power stations in Spain
    - Nuclear power in Spain
  - Renewable energy in Spain
    - Solar power in Spain
    - Wind power in Spain
  - Oil reserves in Spain
- Healthcare in Spain
  - Health in Spain
    - Suicide in Spain
  - Hospitals in Spain
    - Emergency medical services in Spain
  - COVID-19 pandemic in Spain
    - COVID-19 vaccination in Spain
  - Nursing in Spain
- Mining in Spain
  - Slate industry in Spain
- Science and technology in Spain
  - Open access in Spain
  - Spanish inventors and discoverers
    - Spanish inventions and discoveries
- Social Security in Spain
  - Pensions in Spain
  - Unemployment in Spain
    - Unemployment benefits in Spain
    - Youth unemployment in Spain
- Spanish stock markets
  - Madrid Stock Exchange
  - Barcelona Stock Exchange
  - IBEX 35
- Supermarket chains in Spain
- Tallest structures in Spain
  - Tallest buildings in Spain
- Trade unions in Spain
- Tourism in Spain
  - Hotels in Spain
  - National parks of Spain
  - World Heritage Sites in Spain
- Water supply and sanitation in Spain
  - Dams and reservoirs in Spain
  - Ports in Spain

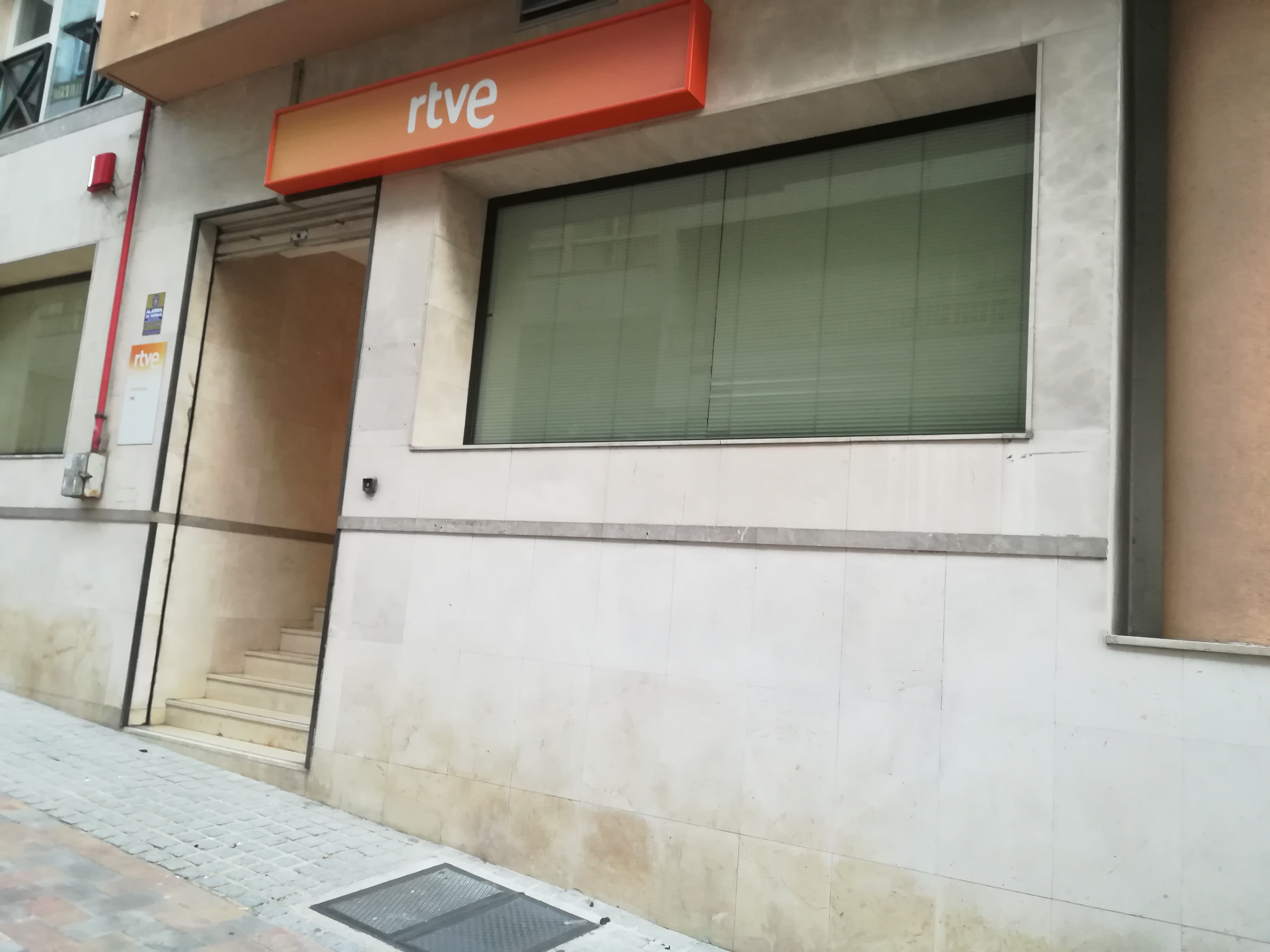
The delegation of RTVE in Pontevedra.

=== Communications in Spain ===
Communications in Spain

- Internet in Spain
- Television in Spain
  - Television stations in Spain
    - RTVE, short for Radio Televisión Española
      - TVE
- Radio stations in Spain
- Telecommunications in Spain
  - Telephone numbers in Spain
- Newspapers in Spain
- Postal codes in Spain
- Golden age of Spanish software

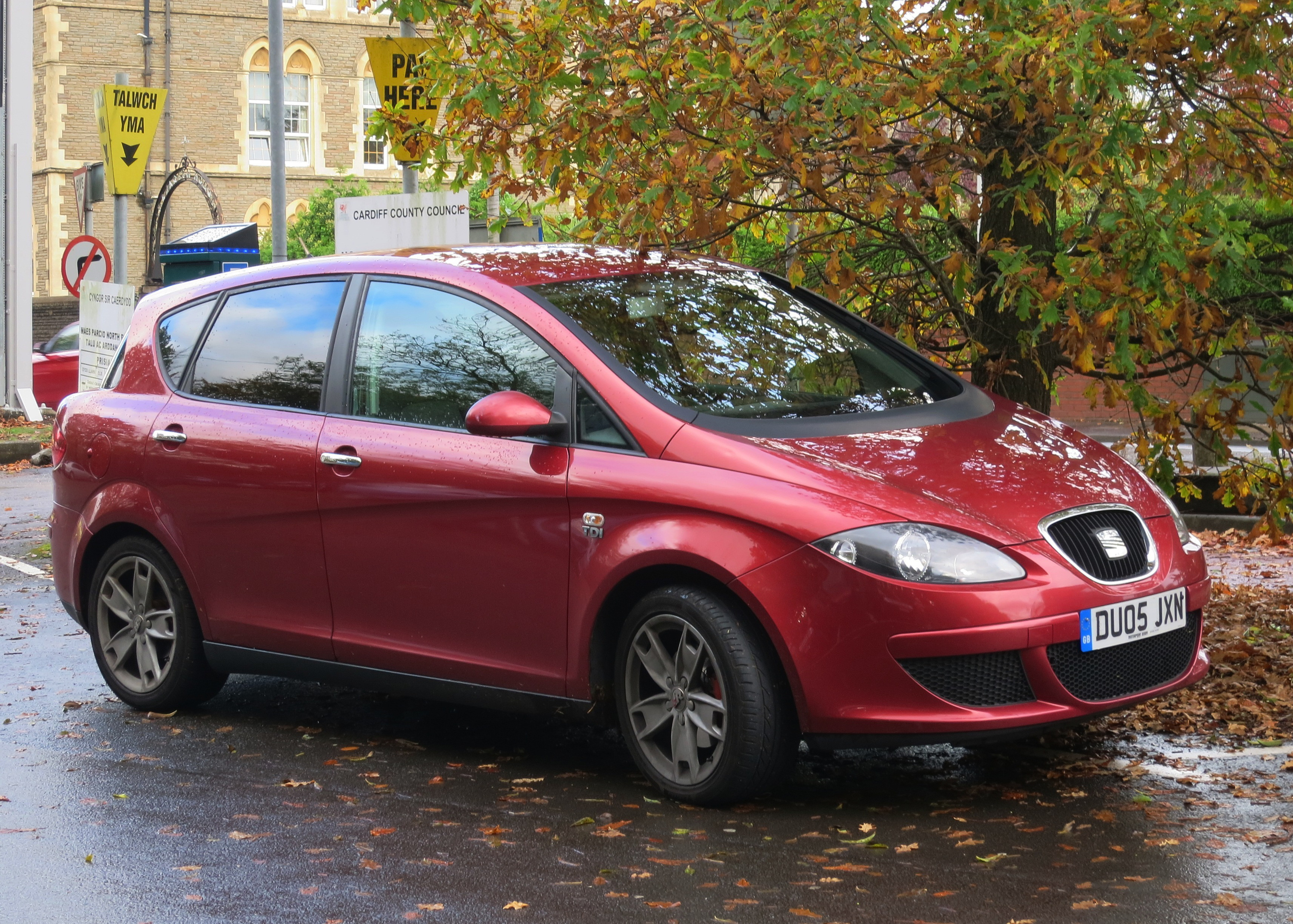
A spanish brand SEAT Toledo car.

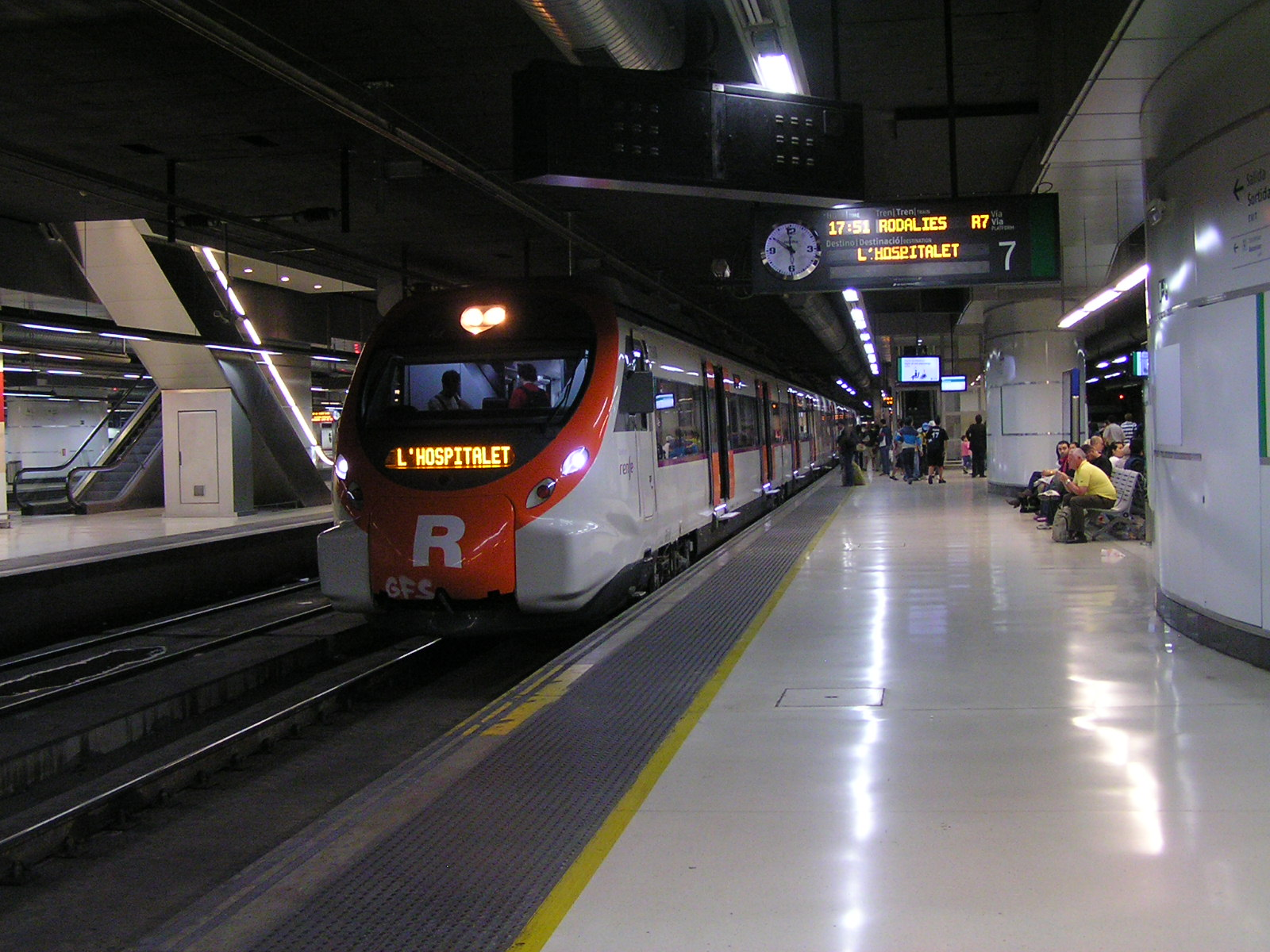
A Rodalíes train entering a station.

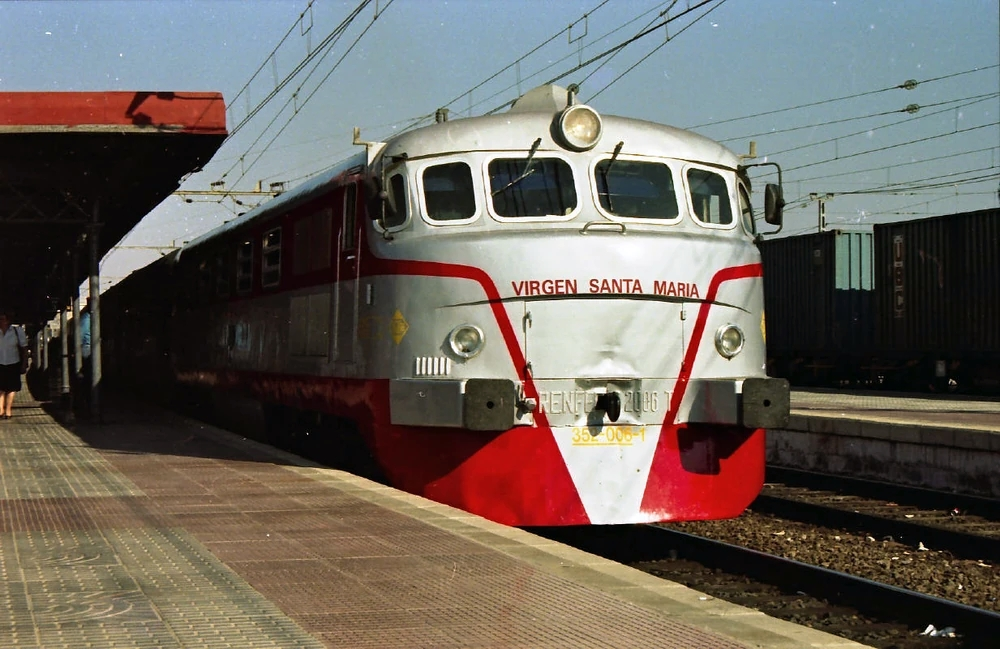
A train manufactured by Talgo in 1990, pulling up at Alcázar de San Juan.

=== Transport in Spain ===
Transport in Spain

- Air transport in Spain
  - Airports in Spain
    - Busiest airports in Spain
  - EADS CASA – defunct aircraft manufacturer
  - Airlines of Spain
    - Iberia (airline), main airline in Spain and Portugal
    - Defunct airlines of Spain
      - Air Spain, former charter airline.
- Rail transport in Spain
  - Rapid transit in Spain
    - Metro Madrid
    - Metro Barcelona
    - Metrovalencia
  - Town tramway systems in Spain
    - Trams in Spain
  - History of rail transport in Spain
  - High-speed rail in Spain
    - AVE, "Alta Velocidad Española", Spanish High Speed
  - Renfe, National Network of the Spanish Railways
    - Cercanías, commuter rail services
    - Euskotren Trena
    - Rodalíes
  - Track gauge in Spain
    - Iberian gauge
    - Narrow-gauge railways in Spain
  - FEVE, Narrow Gauge Railways
  - Ferrocarrils de la Generalitat de Catalunya
  - Ferrocarrils de la Generalitat Valenciana
  - Serveis Ferroviaris de Mallorca
  - Talgo – train manufacturer
- Road transport in Spain
  - Directorate General of Traffic
    - Driving licence in Spain
    - Road signs in Spain
    - Speed limits in Spain
  - Roads in Spain (carreteras)
    - National roads in Spain (carreteras nacionales)
    - Highways in Spain (autopistas and autovías)
    - Roman roads
  - Vehicle registration plates of Spain
  - Automotive industry in Spain
    - Spanish automobiles
    - Plug-in electric vehicles in Spain
    - Road vehicle manufacturers
      - Car manufacturers
        - SEAT
      - Motorcycle manufacturers
        - Montesa Honda – Spanish subsidiary of Honda, manufactures motorcycles and bicycles
  - History of road transport in Spain
    - Spanish automobiles
    - Bultaco – defunct motorcycle manufacturer

== Education in Spain ==
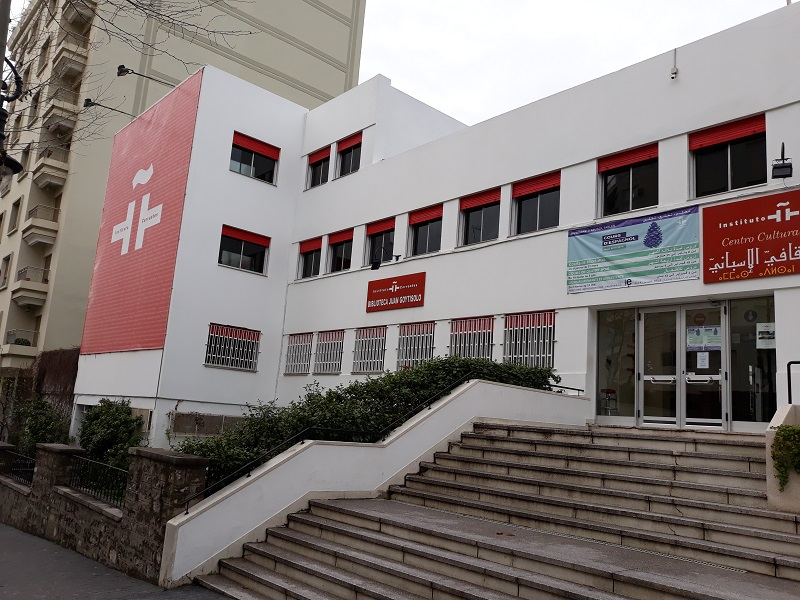
The building of the Instituto Cervantes in Tangier

Education in Spain

- Higher education in Spain
- Spanish school students' union
- Instituto Cervantes
- Academic Awards in Spain
  - National Award for Excellence in Academic Performance (Spain)
  - Honours (Spain)
- Academic grading in Spain
- Academic ranks in Spain
- Spanish universities
  - List of universities in Spain (organized by autonomous communities)
- Diplomatic School of Spain
- DELE
- Tuition fees in Spain

== See also ==
- Spain
- Spain (disambiguation)
- List of international rankings
- Outline of Europe
- Outline of geography
- Outline of Catalonia
  - Outline of Barcelona
