= Immigration to Spain =

Total population
- 10,433,091 born-abroad (20.9%); 7,518,237 foreign nationals (15.1%) (1 October 2026)

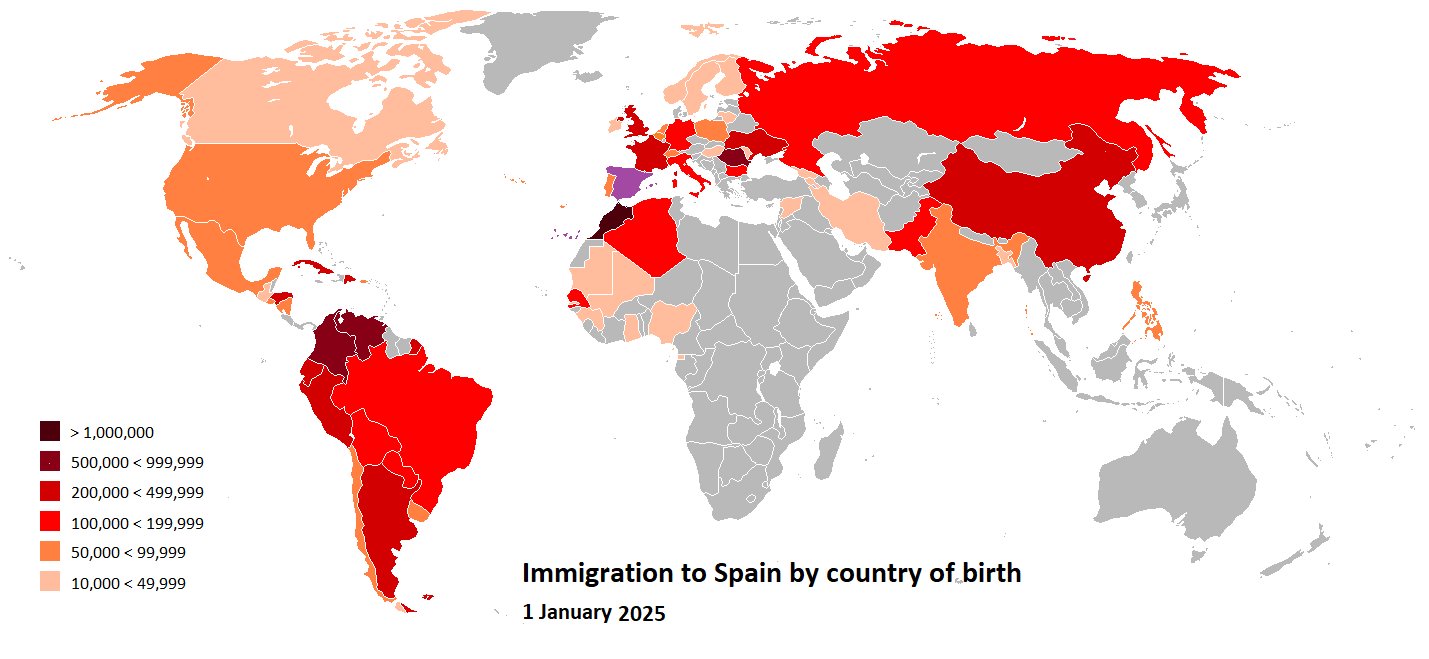
Foreign-born population in Spain (2025)

Immigration to Spain, which had been very low for much of the country's history, increased sharply in the early 21st century. For example, in 1998, immigrants made up just 1.6% of the population, but by 2009, that figure had exceeded 12%. Following a decline during the economic crisis, immigration began to rise again after 2015, with a marked acceleration after 2021, with the foreign-born population now reaching 20.9% of the total population as of October 2026.

As of 1 January 2025, the most recent date for which data are available by specific countries and regions, the foreign-born population in Spain represented 19.3% of the total population. Of these, 4.92% were born in other European countries, while the remaining 14.34% originated from outside Europe. The largest share of the non-European population came from South America, accounting for 7.61% of the total population, followed by those from Africa (3.35%), Central America and the Caribbean (1.75%), Asia (1.25%), North America (0.35%), and Oceania (0.02%). Among them, 6,911,971 individuals (14.1% of the total population) did not hold Spanish citizenship. This places Spain as the 4th country in Europe in terms of immigrant population and the 7th worldwide.

During the early 21st century, the average year-on-year demographic growth set a new record with its 2003 peak variation of 2.1%, doubling the previous record reached in the 1960s when a mean year-on-year growth of 1% was experienced. In 2005 alone, the immigrant population of Spain increased by 700,000 people.

Spain accepted 478,990 new immigrant residents in just the first six months of 2022 alone. During these months, 220,443 people also emigrated from Spain, leaving a record-breaking net migration figure of 258,547. More women than men chose to move to Spain during 2022; this is due to higher rates of emigration from Latin America.

== Population data ==
As of 1 October 2026, the most recent data results show 10,433,091 or 20.9% of the total population were foreign-born.

Previous data from the United Nations, there were 5,947,106 immigrants in Spain in early 2018, 12.8% of the population of Spain. According to the Spanish government, there were 5.6 million foreign residents in Spain in 2010; independent estimates put the figure 14% of total population (Red Cross, World Disasters Report 2006). According to the official 2011 census data, almost 800,000 were Romanian, 774,000 were Moroccan, 317,000 were Ecuadorian, 312,000 were British and 250,000 were Colombian . Other important foreign communities are Bolivian (4.1%), German (3.4%), Italian (3.1%), Bulgarian (2.9%), Chinese (2.6%) and Argentine (2.5%). In 2005, a regularization programme increased the legal immigrant population by 700,000 people. Since 2000, Spain has experienced high population growth as a result of immigration flows, despite a birth rate that is only half of the replacement level.

Foreign nationality
Year	Population	%
1981	198,042	0.52
1986	241,971	0.63
1991	360,655	0.91
1996	542,314	1.37
1998	637,085	1.60
1999	748,954	1.86
2000	923,879	2.28
2001	1,370,657	3.33
2002	1,977,946	4.73
2003	2,664,168	6.24
2004	3,034,326	7.02
2005	3,730,610	8.46
2006	4,144,166	9.27
2007	4,519,554	9.9
2008	5,268,762	11.4
2009	5,648,671	12.1
2010	5,747,734	12.2
2011	5,751,487	12.2
2012	5,736,258	12.1
2013	5,546,238	11.8
2014	5,023,487	10.7
2015	4,729,644	10.1
2016	4,618,581	9.9
2017	4,572,807	9.8
2018	4,663,726	10.0
2019	5,023,279	10.7
2020	5,434,153	11.5
2021	5,440,148	11.5
2022	5,542,932	11.7
2023	6,089,620	12.7
2024	6,502,282	13.4
2025	6,911,971	14.1
2026 (October)	7,518,237	15.1

Foreign-born nationals
Year	Population	%
2002	2,334,098	5.7
2003	2,984,094	7.1
2004	3,547,669	8.3
2005	4,107,226	9.5
2006	4,637,971	10.5
2007	5,200,061	11.6
2008	5,878,919	12.9
2009	6,225,513	13.5
2010	6,280,064	13.5
2011	6,282,208	13.5
2012	6,294,952	13.5
2013	6,165,635	13.2
2014	5,952,770	12.8
2015	5,883,891	12.7
2016	5,913,165	12.7
2017	6,014,708	12.9
2018	6,207,509	13.3
2019	6,549,309	14.0
2020	7,014,753	14.8
2021	7,254,797	15.3
2022	7,468,116	15.7
2023	8,204,206	17.3
2024	8,838,234	18.2
2025	9,464,210	19.3
2026 (October)	10,433,091	20.9

According to Eurostat, as 1 January of 2025, there were 9.464 million foreign-born residents in Spain, corresponding to 19.3% of the total population. Of these, 7.862 million (16.0%) were born outside the EU and 1.602 million (3.3%) were born in another EU Member State.

As of 2005 Spain had the second highest immigration rates within the EU, just after Cyprus, and the second highest absolute net migration in the World (after the USA).

Over 920,000 immigrants arrived in Spain during 2007, in addition to 802,971 in 2006, 682,711 in 2005, and 645,844 in 2004.

For nationalities outside of this category, in order to stay in Spain for more than 3 months, a residence card, residence visa or work permit is required.

Two distinct groups can be identified: those immigrants (mostly of working age) originating from countries mostly located in Eastern Europe, South America or Africa, with lower purchasing power than Spain, comprising most of the immigrating population, and those (of whom many are retired) originating from northern European or other Western countries with a higher GDP per capita than Spain.

== Immigrants from Europe ==
Immigrants from Europe make up a growing proportion of immigrants in Spain. The main countries of origin are Romania, the United Kingdom, Germany, Italy, and Bulgaria.

The British authorities estimate that the real population of British citizens living in Spain is much bigger than Spanish official figures suggest, establishing them at about 1,000,000, about 800,000 being permanent residents. Of these, according to the BBC and contrary to popular belief, only about 21.5% are over the age of 65.

In fact, according to the Financial Times, Spain is the most favoured destination for West Europeans considering to move from their own country elsewhere in the EU.

== Social attitudes to immigration ==
Unlike other countries in the EU, Spain has not recorded any relevant anti-immigration about until fairly recently. According to some analysts, the causes behind this are multiple. Drawing from the experience of many Spaniards during the 1960s and then again in the beginning of the 21st century when the crisis struck the country, there may be also a collective understanding that hardships force people to seek work abroad.

A January 2004 survey by Spanish newspaper El País showed that the "majority" of Spaniards believe immigration was too high. Small parties, such as Movimiento Social Español, openly campaign using nationalist or anti-immigrant rhetoric as do other small far-right parties such as National Democracy (Spain) and España 2000. These parties have never won national or regional parliamentary seats. However, while the far-right political party Vox has gained headlines for favouring tough stance against immigration, commentators have suggested that this has not translated into electoral success for them.

According to an October 2024 survey for the El País newspaper and Cadena SER radio station, 57% of Spaniards believe there is "too much" immigration to Spain.

== Immigration by country of origin ==
Population by country of birth (as of 1 January 2025)
Country	Population
Morocco	1,165,955
Colombia	978,041
Venezuela	692,316
(European Union) Romania	521,181
Ecuador	468,751
Argentina	450,883
Peru	430,277
United Kingdom	281,584
Cuba	252,290
Honduras	220,593
(European Union) France	219,791
Ukraine	209,592
China	209,320
Dominican Republic	207,135
Bolivia	193,275
Brazil	189,712
(European Union) Germany	180,264
(European Union) Italy	164,380
Paraguay	162,633
Russia	141,438
Pakistan	135,696
Senegal	109,523
Algeria	103,935
(European Union) Bulgaria	101,578
(European Union) Portugal	96,773
Nicaragua	93,905
Uruguay	91,437
Mexico	87,575
Chile	82,165
United States	76,180
India	73,951
(European Union) Netherlands	62,007
Philippines	60,756
Switzerland	60,164
(European Union) Belgium	56,924
(European Union) Poland	56,656
El Salvador	40,811
Mali	38,855
Nigeria	34,793
Gambia	31,753
Equatorial Guinea	26,649
Bangladesh	25,883
Moldova	25,171
Ghana	23,953
Georgia	23,510
(European Union) Sweden	23,082
Guatemala	21,248
(European Union) Ireland	20,959
Guinea	15,873
(European Union) Lithuania	15,677
Iran	15,467
Armenia	15,055
Mauritania	13,909
(European Union) Hungary	13,770
Syria	12,888
(European Union) Finland	11,684
Norway	10,774
Belarus	10,640
Turkey	10,435
Canada	10,425

Population by continent of birth (as of 1 January 2025)
Continent	Number	%
Americas	4,772,270	50.4%
South America	3,739,859	39.5%
Central America/Caribbean	858,231	9.1%
North America	174,180	1.8%
Europe	2,417,433	25.5%
European Union	1,601,863	16.9%
Other Europe	815,570	8.6%
Africa	1,647,410	17.4%
Asia	616,222	6.5%
Oceania	10,675	0.1%
Total	9,464,210	100%

=== Recent trends ===
Countries with at least 10,000 people, immigrating each year.
Country	2022	2023	2024
Colombia	176,957	175,826	173,420
Morocco	116,344	126,969	136,413
Venezuela	95,551	102,430	118,086
Peru	68,621	70,659	73,237
Argentina	59,904	61,311	57,097
Cuba	28,917	32,733	38,179
Romania	44,932	42,791	35,217
Ecuador	24,331	29,693	33,101
Ukraine	89,838	33,913	30,992
Honduras	34,840	32,882	29,867
Paraguay	23,941	24,986	25,430
Brazil	23,856	23,804	24,486
Algeria	12,979	15,789	23,598
China	14,029	20,028	23,584
Pakistan	17,541	19,460	21,690
Senegal	11,820	11,791	21,000
United Kingdom	19,977	19,576	19,916
Italy	23,048	20,899	19,735
Russia	22,753	23,519	17,555
France	15,630	15,449	15,892
Germany	15,998	15,983	15,455
Dominican Republic	14,159	15,334	14,932
Nicaragua	16,603	14,226	12,916
Total	1,258,894	1,250,991	1,288,562

=== Major immigration ===
This chart shows the numbers of foreign nationals in Spain after 2000. European Union member states are indicated with the EU flag in regional European sub-divisions. The number of Latin American foreign nationals, without Spanish citizenship, decreased massively after 2009 mostly due to the naturalization of hundreds of thousands of these citizens who became eligible for naturalisation and therefore do not count as immigrants anymore on the official statistics. Due to the emergence of a new wave of immigrants in Spain, the number of foreign residents from Latin America, Morocco and other countries has grown substantially, though in the 2020s, the number of naturalisations in Spain has also risen again as many foreign nationals who arrived after 2017 are being naturalised.

See the next chart below, which shows the number of naturalizations in 2022–2025 for further information.

Origin	2000	2005	2010	2015	2020	2025	Article
Morocco	173,158	511,294	754,080	750,883	865,945	968,999	Moroccans in Spain
Colombia	25,247	271,239	292,641	151,258	273,050	676,534	Colombians in Spain
(European Union) Romania	6,410	317,366	831,235	752,268	667,378	609,270	Romanians in Spain
Venezuela	12,119	49,206	60,399	48,421	189,110	377,809	Venezuelans in Spain
(European Union) Italy	27,874	95,377	184,277	179,363	252,008	345,777	Italians in Spain
United Kingdom	99,017	227,187	387,677	283,243	262,885	266,462	British migration to Spain
Peru	27,422	85,029	140,182	71,112	106,712	260,544	Peruvians in Spain
China	19,191	87,731	158,244	191,638	232,807	238,372	Chinese people in Spain
Ukraine	1,646	65,667	83,313	91,004	115,186	202,105	Ukrainians in Spain
Honduras	1,293	7,017	27,363	43,283	121,963	177,929	Hondurans in Spain
Argentina	23,351	152,975	132,249	75,313	89,029	148,585	Argentines in Spain
Ecuador	20,481	497,799	399,586	176,397	130,919	132,372	Ecuadorians in Spain
(European Union) Germany	88,651	133,588	195,824	130,911	111,937	131,380	Germans in Spain
(European Union) France	46,375	77,791	123,870	99,598	108,275	127,015	French in Spain
Paraguay	711	16,295	85,687	69,451	87,045	122,635	Paraguayans in Spain
Pakistan	4,195	31,913	56,877	77,695	97,705	116,641	Pakistanis in Spain
Russia	5,199	36,319	49,820	68,387	82,788	110,665	Russians in Spain
(European Union) Portugal	43,339	66,236	142,520	98,751	97,628	109,930	Portuguese in Spain
(European Union) Bulgaria	3,031	93,037	169,552	142,328	122,375	109,604	Bulgarians in Spain
Brazil	11,126	54,115	117,808	73,863	98,655	105,990	Brazilians in Spain
Senegal	7,526	29,608	61,970	61,798	76,973	101,432	Senegalese people in Spain
Algeria	10,759	46,278	58,743	62,398	66,893	89,592	Algerians in Spain
Cuba	17,814	45,009	54,954	46,397	64,634	88,367	Cubans in Spain
Nicaragua	700	1,953	12,190	20,941	57,530	72,492	Nicaraguans in Spain
Bolivia	2,117	97,947	213,169	126,375	92,630	67,242	Bolivians in Spain
Dominican Republic	24,847	57,134	91,212	75,315	75,261	64,212	Dominicans in Spain
India	6,807	17,558	32,947	36,724	54,387	63,015	Indians in Spain
(European Union) Netherlands	21,763	33,845	53,983	45,844	46,891	62,896	Dutch people in Spain
(European Union) Poland	8,164	36,477	86,324	63,324	53,418	61,258	Poles in Spain
United States	15,720	25,831	25,771	30,183	40,712	57,379	Americans in Spain
TOTAL	923,879	3,730,610	5,747,734	4,729,644	5,036,878	6,911,671	

== Irregular migration ==
The concept of an "irregular", "undocumented", or "illegal" migrant did not become meaningful in Spain's social imagination until the passing of the Ley de Extranjería in 1985, a year before Spain's entry into the European Communities.

Even though the main paths for the entry of clandestine migration have traditionally been airports and land borders, the sea route has proven to have a "profound impact at the social level" owing to qualitative, rather than quantitative, reasons.

Regarding the governance of the migration of Sub-Saharan people from Morocco (and Western Sahara) into Spain (which include crossings into the autonomous cities of Ceuta and Melilla, as well as a sea route to the Canary Islands), the Moroccan and Spanish authorities follow necropolitical forms of border control which are complemented with the favouring of the idea of "advancing borders" by reaching deals with origin or transit countries such as Guinea Conakry, Mali, Ivory Coast, and Gambia.

During the Premierships of People's Party José María Aznar and Socialist Party José Luis Rodríguez Zapatero, Spain gave residency to more than 1 million undocumented migrants in different amnesties in 1996, 2000, 2001 and 2005.

On 9 October 2024, Spanish Prime Minister Pedro Sánchez urged the European Parliament to speed up the implementation of the New Pact on Migration and Asylum to alleviate the migration crisis in the Canary Islands, which had seen the illegal arrival of a record number of 46,843 migrants, mostly from Senegal, Mali and Morocco (up from 39,910 in 2023). Sánchez tried to push through a law that would introduce mandatory distribution of migrants among Spanish regions in order to alleviate pressure in the Canary Islands.

The Sánchez government planned to legalize around 900,000 undocumented migrants by 2027.

On July 2026, almost 1.2 million of Spain's undocumented migrants applied for legal status. The largest groups of applicants came from Colombia (25.9%), Morocco (13.3%), Venezuela (11.8%), Peru (8.8%), and Honduras (4.9%).

Along with Melilla, Ceuta's position on the Maghreb's Mediterranean coast attracts migrants who attempt entry into Spain, utilising several methods to cross the border (including breaching the exclave's perimeter or using the sea to skirt around it). Notable large-scale breaches occurred in 2021 (approximately 8,000 people), and 2026 (approximately 80,000 people).

On 14 November 2026, a single-day record of 1,580 migrants arrived in Spain's Canary Islands aboard 15 boats, mostly landing on the island of El Hierro. Most of the arrivals departed from West African countries, including Senegal, The Gambia, and Guinea. In total, over 9,000 migrants reached the islands in the first two weeks of November 2026. In response, the Spanish government declared a migration emergency. Officials from the Canary Islands regional government, including President Fernando Clavijo, warned that the EU Migration Pact risked failing peripheral border regions unless the EU and Madrid activated its solidarity mechanisms and provided urgent support.

== Naturalizations ==
From 2005 to 2025 alone, roughly 2.9 million foreigners were granted Spanish citizenship through naturalization.

Since the end of the 20th century the number of foreigners who have obtained Spanish nationality has grown steadily, as Spain has been the EU country with the biggest number of approved naturalizations since 2010 until 2015. One out of four naturalizations made in the European Union in 2014 were belonging to Spain. Most of these naturalizations went to citizens coming from Latin America (which explains the massive decrease of these citizens counting as immigrants in Spain) mainly from Colombia, Ecuador and Peru, although Morocco was amongst the top three as well. After four years being the first, Spain dropped to the third position in 2015 due to the stricter laws to naturalize citizens. Still, 114,351 foreigners became Spanish citizens in 2015, the majority being Latin Americans.

New Spanish nationals by naturalization, 2005–2025
Year	Naturalizations
2005	42,829
2006	62,339
2007	71,810
2008	84,170
2009	79,597
2010	123,721
2011	114,599
2012	115,557
2013	261,295
2014	205,880
2015	114,351
2016	150,944
2017	66,498
2018	90,774
2019	98,954
2020	126,266
2021	202,336
2022	181,581
2023	240,208
2024	252,476
2025	299,732
Total	2,892,091

=== Naturalisations by country ===
The following table shows the number of naturalisations of Spanish residents by country of citizenship (among countries with more than 1,000 naturalisations of their citizens as Spaniards) from 2022 to 2025.

People from Latin American countries, Portugal, Philippines, Andorra and Equatorial Guinea can be naturalised as Spanish citizens after two years of permanent residence, as per the Spanish nationality law, while for most other foreign-born residents, it is ten years. That explains the higher rates of naturalisation per capita among the Latin American communities in Spain, in comparison with the Moroccan or the Romanian one.

Country	2025	2024	2023	2022
Morocco	42,114	42,910	54,027	55,463
Colombia	37,712	26,224	18,738	11,125
Venezuela	36,271	35,403	30,154	8,036
Honduras	20,745	15,574	11,189	5,778
Peru	15,920	10,480	8,489	5,152
Cuba	14,390	8,045	9,790	4,780
Ecuador	13,689	10,871	11,326	10,845
Argentina	11,291	8,558	7,208	3,792
Dominican Republic	9,915	9,452	10,275	8,100
Nicaragua	8,951	7,167	5,160	2,756
Bolivia	8,902	8,385	9,103	9,016
Romania	7,185	5,973	4,932	4,217
Paraguay	6,946	5,401	4,947	4,172
Brazil	6,657	5,312	5,759	3,831
Pakistan	6,495	6,395	6,829	6,400
Mexico	4,146	3,066	2,720	1,521
Senegal	3,354	2,648	2,712	2,438
Ukraine	2,867	2,588	2,603	3,206
Chile	2,795	2,213	2,020	1,380
Italy	2,745	1,864	1,395	1,214
Nigeria	2,214	2,281	2,398	2,855
India	2,114	2,125	2,450	2,414
Algeria	2,109	2,140	2,233	2,228
Uruguay	1,919	1,579	1,635	1,248
Philippines	1,592	1,294	877	1,132
Russia	1,576	2,588	2,246	1,733
Equatorial Guinea	1,309	1,045	874	849
Bangladesh	1,143	1,226	1,216	1,261
Portugal	1,131	812	643	555
Ghana	1,116	1,132	1,084	871
Bulgaria	1,062	925	764	925
France	955	1,039	425	247
TOTAL	299,732	252,476	240,208	181,581

== Immigration detention ==
There are nine detention centers in Spain, known as CIEs (Centro de Internamiento de Extranjeros), run by the Ministry of the Interior, which can be found in the cities of Madrid, Barcelona, Valencia, Algeciras, Tarifa, Malaga, and in the islands of Gran Canaria, Fuerteventura, and Tenerife.

Expulsion paperwork can be initiated when a foreign person is in one of the following situations:

1. Lacking documentation in Spanish territory.
2. Working without a work permit, even if they have a valid resident permit.
3. Be involved in activities that violate public order or interior or exterior state security or any activity contrary to Spanish interests or that could put in danger Spain's relations with other countries.
4. Be convicted inside or outside of Spain of a crime punishable by incarceration for greater than one year.
5. Hiding or falsifying their situation from the Ministry of the Interior.
6. Lacking a legal livelihood or taking part in illegal activity.

Various civil organizations (e.g. APDHA, SOS Racismo, and Andalucía Acoge) have appealed to the Supreme Court of Spain, declaring the regulations behind the CIEs null and void for violating several human rights.

== Crime rates ==
A 2008 study finds that the rates of crimes committed by immigrants are substantially higher than nationals. The study finds that "the arrival of immigrants has resulted in a lack of progress in the reduction of offences against property and in a minor increase in the number of offences against Collective Security (i.e. drugs and trafficking). In the case of nationals, their contribution to the increase in the crime rate is primarily concentrated in offences against persons." By controlling for socioeconomic and demographic factors, the gap between immigrants and natives is reduced but not fully. The authors also find "that a higher proportions of American, non-UE European, and African immigrants tend to widen the crime differential, the effect being larger for the latter ones". The same paper provides supports for the notion that labour market conditions impact the relationship between crime and immigration. Cultural differences were also statistically detected. This study has been criticized for not using strong instruments for identifying causality: the "instruments (lagged values of the covariates and measures of the service share of GDP in a province) are not convincing in dealing with the endogeneity of migrant location choice." Spanish National Statistics Institute (INE) published a study that analyzes records in the Register of Convicted in 2008. The data show that immigrants are overrepresented in the crime statistics: 70% of all crimes were committed by Spaniards and 30% by foreigners. Foreigners make up 15% of the population.

== See also ==
- Opposition to immigration
- Remigration
- Demographics of Spain
- Immigration to Europe
- Spanish nationality law
- List of countries by immigrant population
- List of sovereign states and dependent territories by fertility rate
