= Argentina–Spain relations =

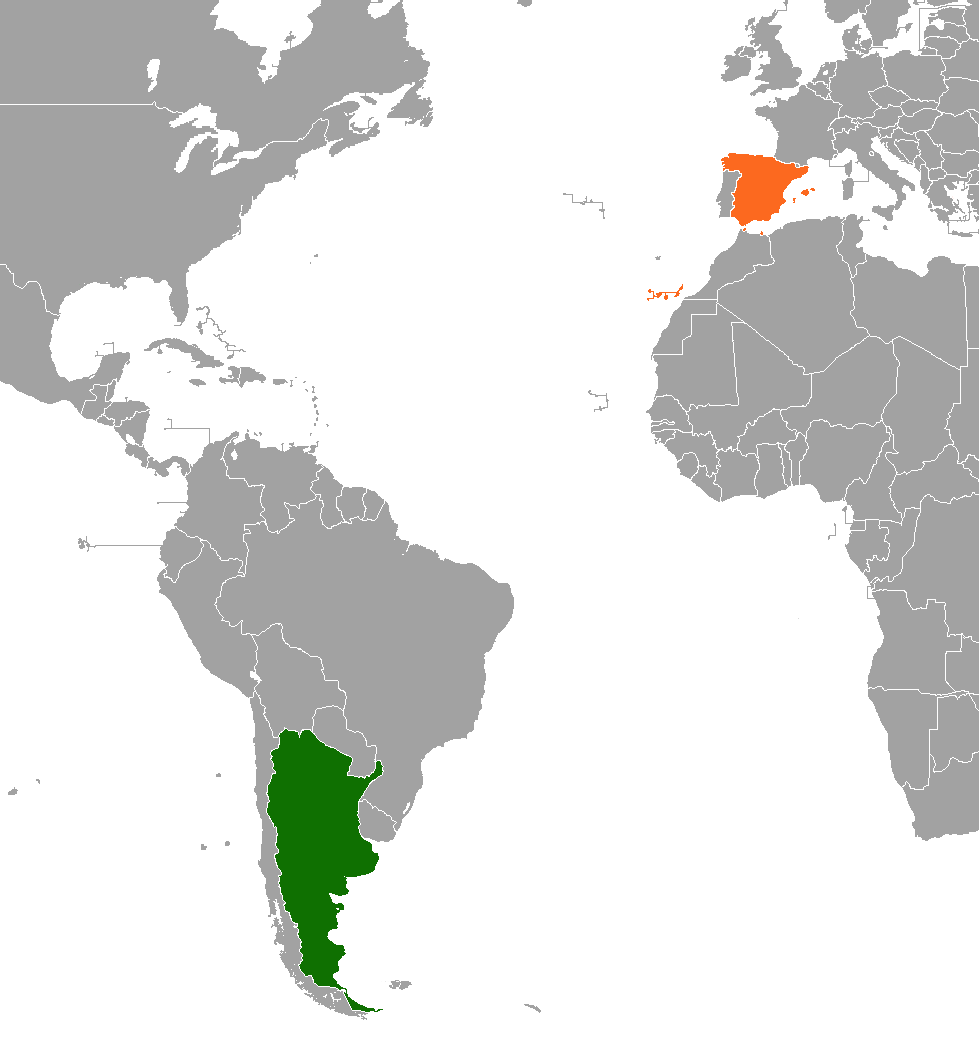
- Argentina: Spain

Diplomatic mission
- Embassy of Argentina, Madrid: Embassy of Spain, Buenos Aires

The Argentine Republic and the Kingdom of Spain maintain bilateral relations. Since a great portion of the immigrants to Argentina before the mid-19th century were of Spanish descent, the large majority of Argentines are at least partly of Spanish ancestry. Also, a significant part of the late-19th century/early-20th century immigrants to Argentina were Spaniards. Both nations are members of the Organization of Ibero-American States and the United Nations.

== History ==
=== Spanish colonization ===
In 1516, the first Spanish expedition to visit what is now Argentina was led by the explorer Juan Díaz de Solís. In 1536, the first Spanish settlement was created in the Río de la Plata basin. In 1776, the Viceroyalty of the Río de la Plata was created with the head of government placed in Buenos Aires.

=== Independence ===
Spain recognized an independent Argentina in 1863, with the signing of the Treaty of Peace and Amity, thus establishing diplomatic relations between the two nations.

=== Post independence ===
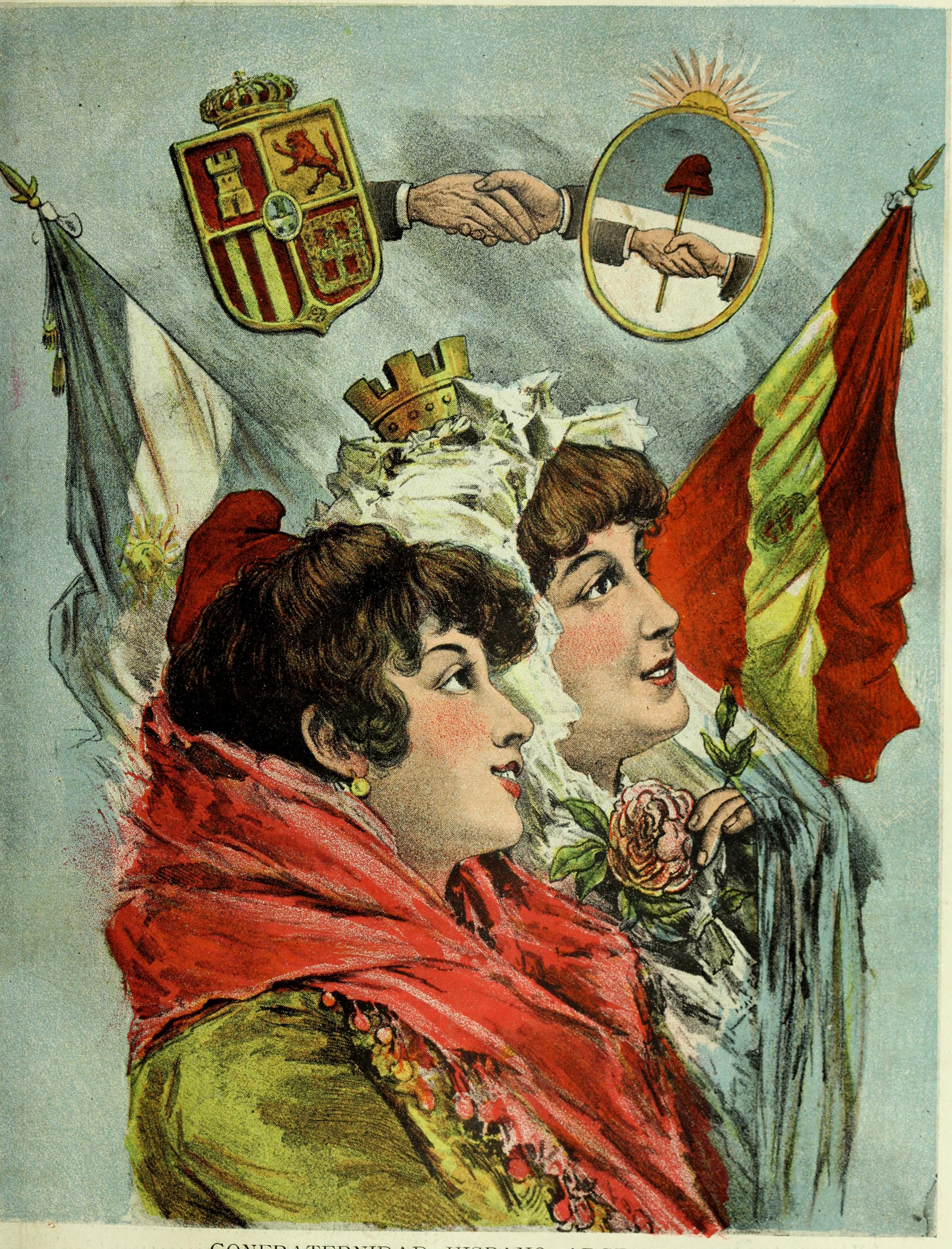
The Spanish-Argentine brotherhood in 1900 portrayed by the Liberty of Oudiné and Hispania.

Since obtaining independence from Spain, diplomatic relations between the two nations have been stable. During the Spanish Civil War, Argentina remained neutral and gave asylum to any Spanish citizen requesting it without regards to whether they were Republicans or Nationalists. At the end of the war, Argentina maintained diplomatic relations with the government of General Francisco Franco. Maintaining diplomatic relations allowed for the first lady of Argentina Eva Perón to visit Spain in 1947 and donate five million tons of food to the Spanish people.

After the death of General Franco in Spain in 1975, Argentina entered a period of military dictatorship between 1976 and 1983. In 1982, Argentina invaded the Falkland Islands. In 2012, British documents were made declassified and stated that Prime Minister Margaret Thatcher feared that during the Falkland war, Spain would join Argentina by invading Gibraltar. However, as of 31 December 2020, Spain and the United Kingdom reached an agreement about Gibraltar dispute.

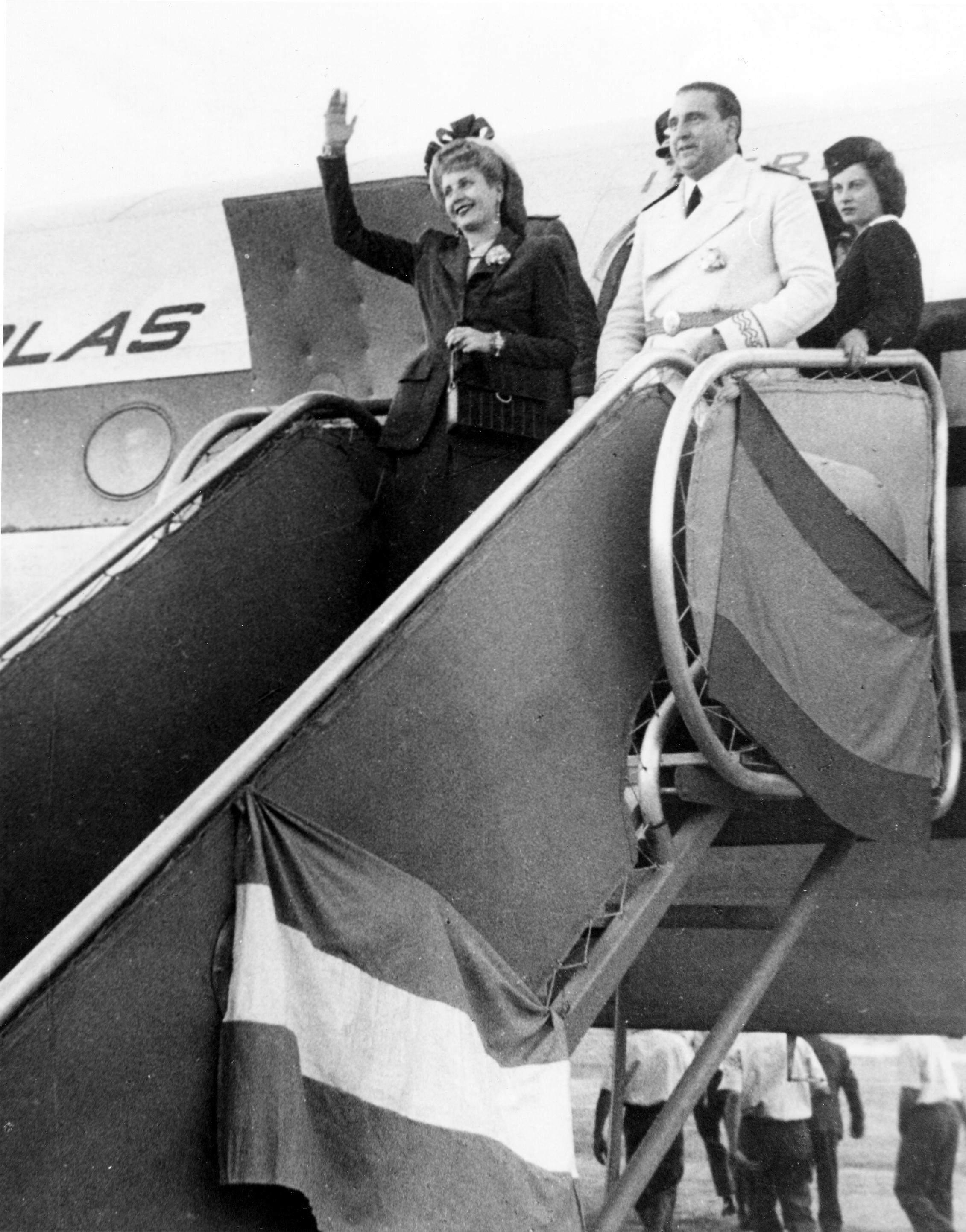
Eva Perón in Spain; 1947.

A dispute arose in 2012, when Argentina sought to nationalize the energy company YPF, owned by the Spanish multinational company Repsol. Spain warned against such a move stating that it would harm bilateral relations if such a move were to happen. On 16 April, Argentina's President Cristina Fernández de Kirchner announced the nationalization of YPF, to which Spain warned of a "clear and decisive" response. The Argentine government agreed a $5 billion settlement with Repsol over YPF.

In the 2010s an Argentine court accused Antonio González Pacheco, a former police inspector, of committing criminal acts during the Franco regime. He was sought for extradition by an Argentine judge in 2014. María Romilda Servini had called for the indictment. The request for extradition was refused by the Spanish High Court on the basis that the statute of limitations had run out on the accusation against him.

In 2021, Spain pledged support to Argentina vis-à-vis the latter country's negotiations with the IMF to renegotiate on the mechanisms of their debt, singularly those relating to the payment of the US$45 billion borrowed by the Macri administration from the IMF. In June 2021, Spanish Prime Minister Pedro Sánchez paid a visit to Argentina and met with President Alberto Fernández. In May 2022, Argentine President Alberto Fernández paid a visit to Spain.

Sánchez endorsed Kircherist candidate Sergio Massa during the 2023 Argentine presidential election, which were won by Javier Milei, who departed from the socialist policies of Argentine Peronists and Sanchez. Relations between both presidents have been complicated since then. Spanish minister Óscar Puente said that Milei "consumes substances" in April 2024, and the next month Milei pointed out the corruption scandals that involve the wife of Sánchez, Begoña Gómez. Sánchez asked for formal apologies, which were denied; Argentine spokesman Manuel Adorni said it was Sánchez who should apologise to Milei instead. When asked if Sánchez would apologize to Milei, Spanish spokesman Patxi López refused to answer. As a consequence of the conflict, Sánchez indefinitely removed Spain's ambassador in Argentina, María Jesús Alonso Jiménez. On the other side, Milei said that he would not break relations between both countries merely because of personal conflicts between rulers.

== High-level visits ==
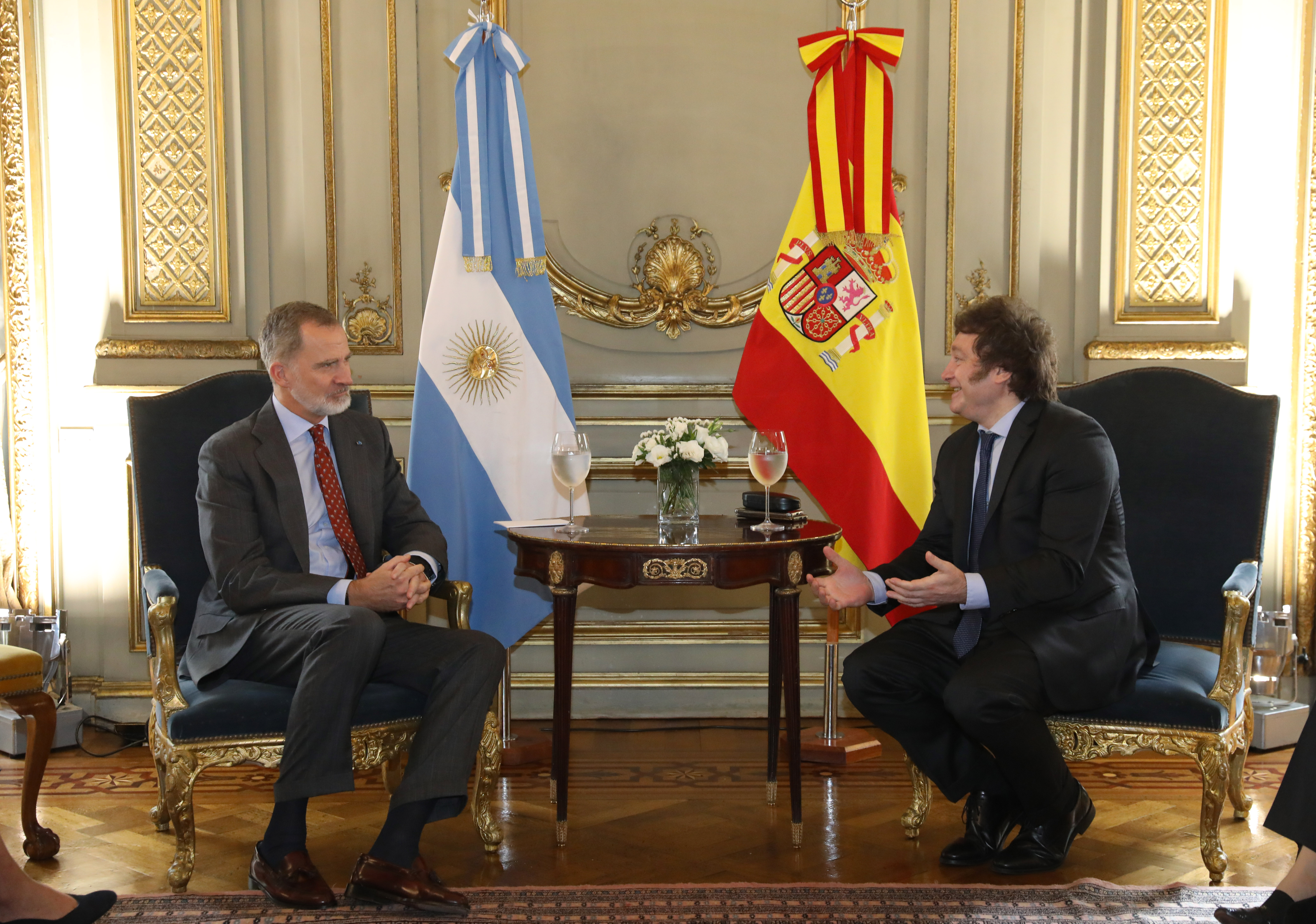
King Felipe VI of Spain and President Javier Milei of Argentina in Buenos Aires; 2023.

High-level visits from Argentina to Spain

- First Lady Eva Perón (1947)
- President Arturo Frondizi (1960)
- President Alejandro Agustín Lanusse (1973)
- President Héctor Cámpora (1973)
- Vice President Isabel Perón (1974)
- President Raúl Alfonsín (1984)
- President Carlos Menem (1992, 1993, 1994)
- President Fernando de la Rúa (2000)
- President Eduardo Duhalde (2003)
- President Néstor Kirchner (2003, 2004, 2005, 2006)
- President Cristina Fernández de Kirchner (2009, 2010)
- President Mauricio Macri (2017, 2019)
- President Alberto Fernández (2020, 2021, May and November 2022)
- President Javier Milei (May and June 2024, June and September 2025; March, June, October and November 2026)

High-level visits from Spain to Argentina

- Princess Isabel (1910)
- King Juan Carlos I (1978, 1985, 1995, 2003, 2004, 2010)
- Prime Minister Felipe González (1987, 1990, 1995)
- Prime Minister José María Aznar (1997)
- Prime Minister José Luis Rodríguez Zapatero (2005, 2007)
- Crown Prince Felipe (1991, 2007)
- King Felipe VI (2019, 2023)
- Prime Minister Mariano Rajoy (2018)
- Prime Minister Pedro Sánchez (2018, 2021)

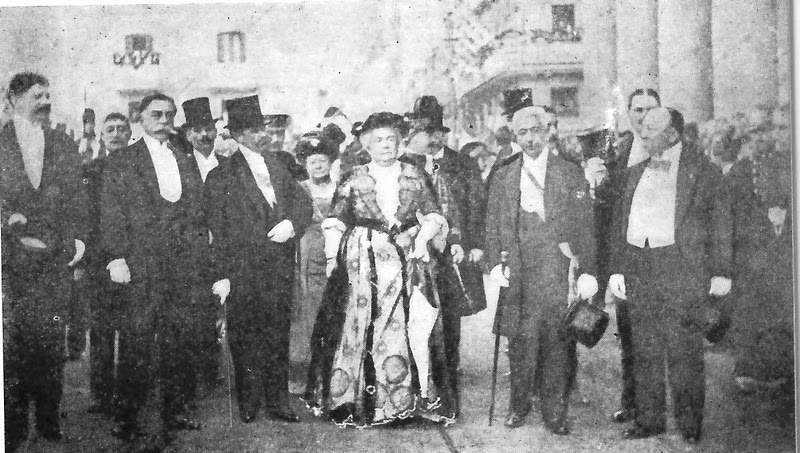
Princess Isabel, Argentine President José Figueroa Alcorta, and Chilean President Pedro Montt in Buenos Aires; 1910.

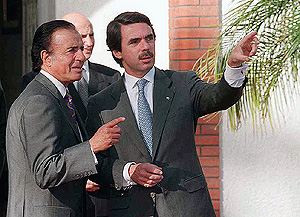
President Carlos Menem and Prime Minister José María Aznar in Buenos Aires; 1997.

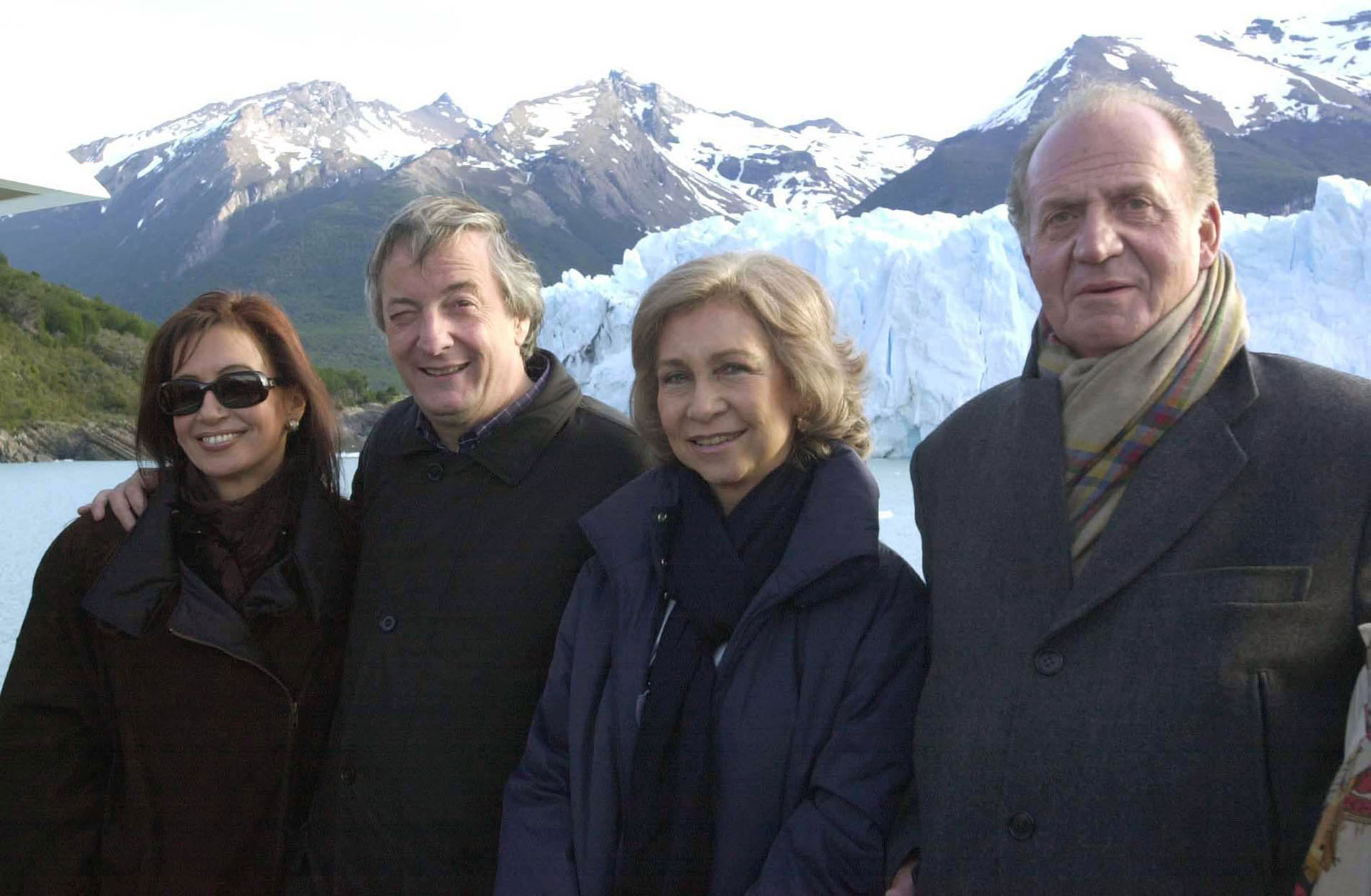
President Néstor Kirchner, First Lady Cristina Fernández de Kirchner along with King Juan Carlos I and Queen Sofía in Los Glaciares National Park, Argentina; 2003.

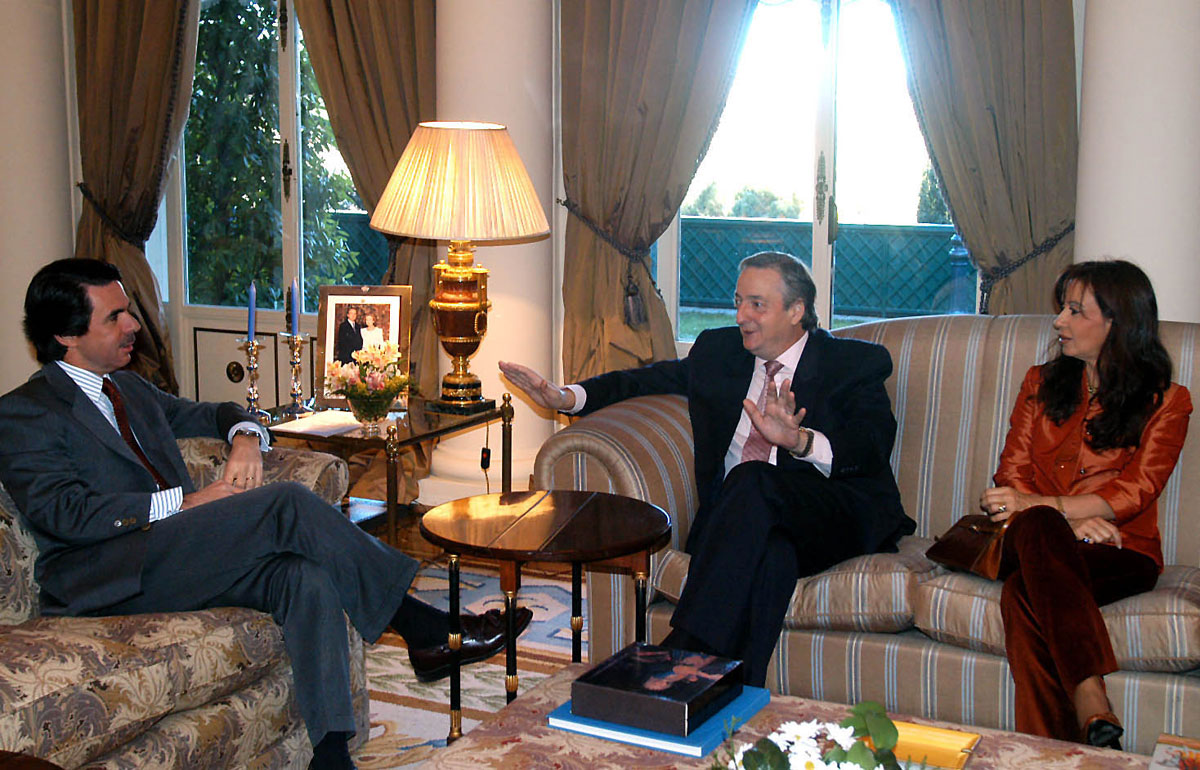
Prime Minister José María Aznar and President Néstor Kirchner in Madrid; 2004.

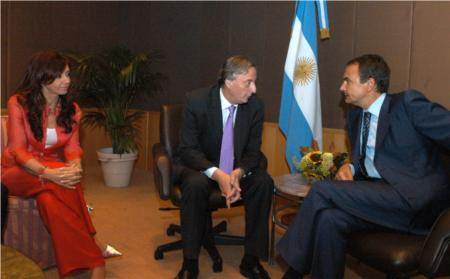
President Néstor Kirchner, First Lady Cristina de Kirchner and Prime Minister José Luis Rodríguez Zapatero in New York City; 2005.

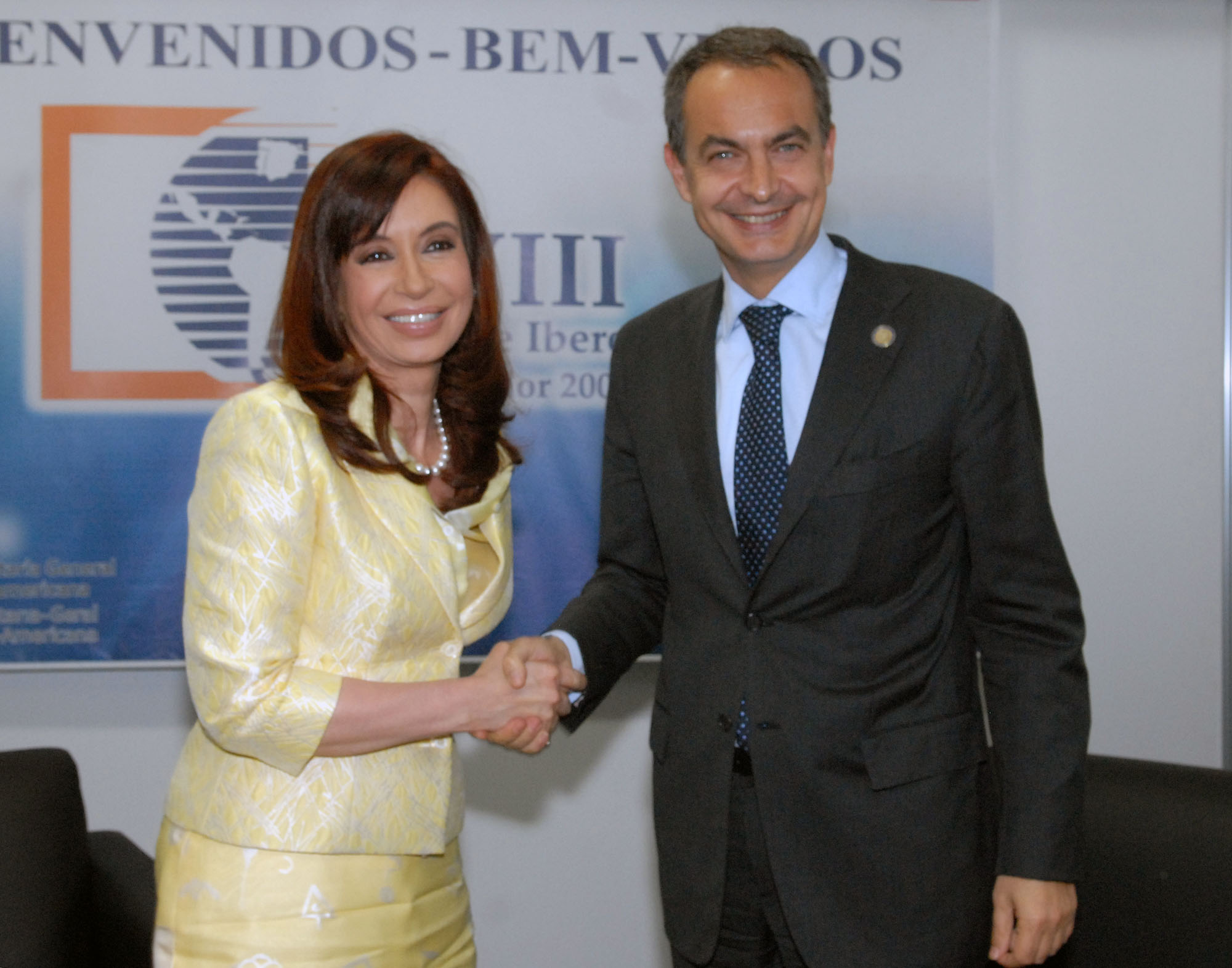
President Cristina Fernández de Kirchner and Prime Minister José Luis Rodríguez Zapatero in Santiago, Chile; 2008.

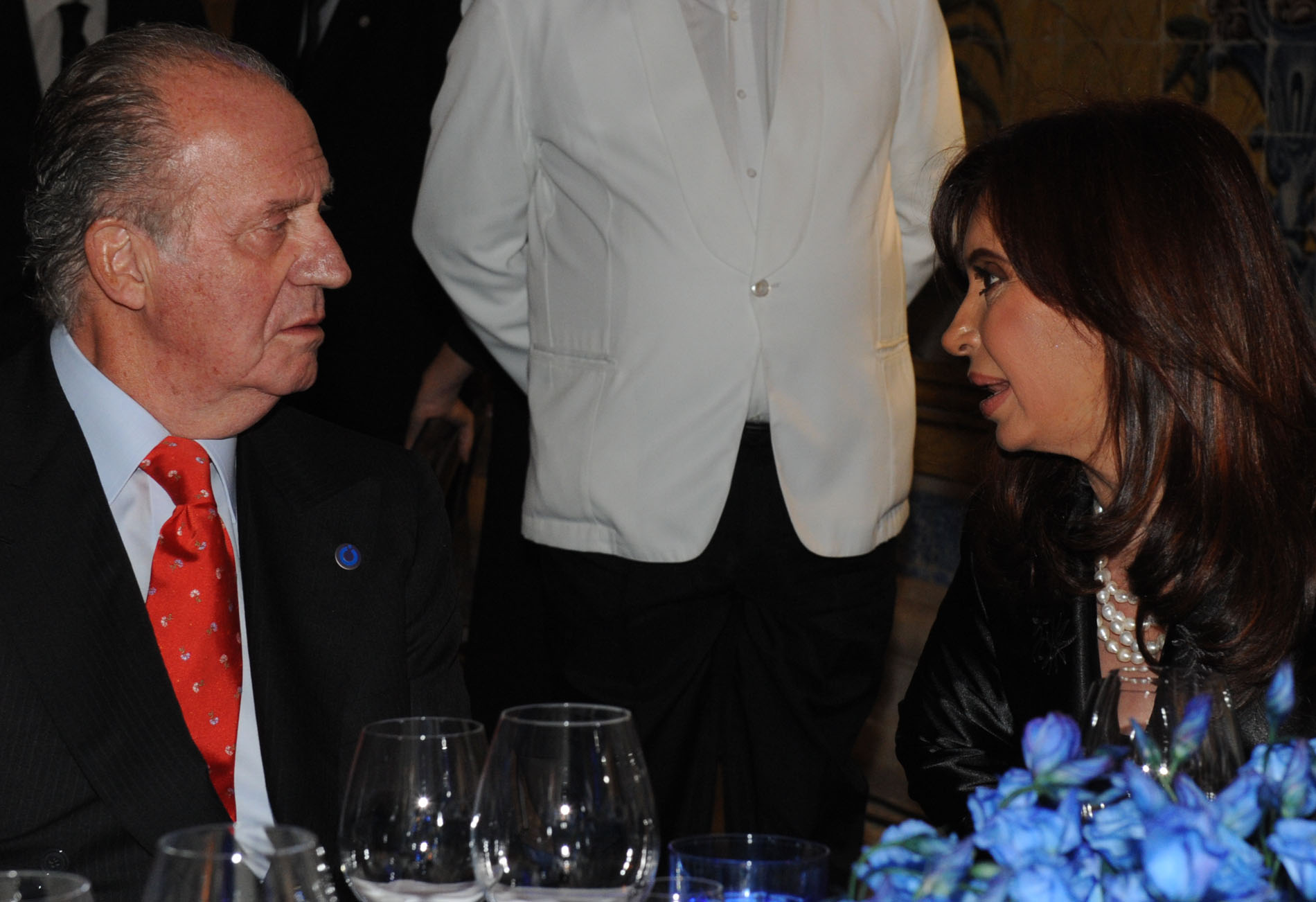
King Juan Carlos I and President Cristina Fernández de Kirchner in Portugal; 2009.

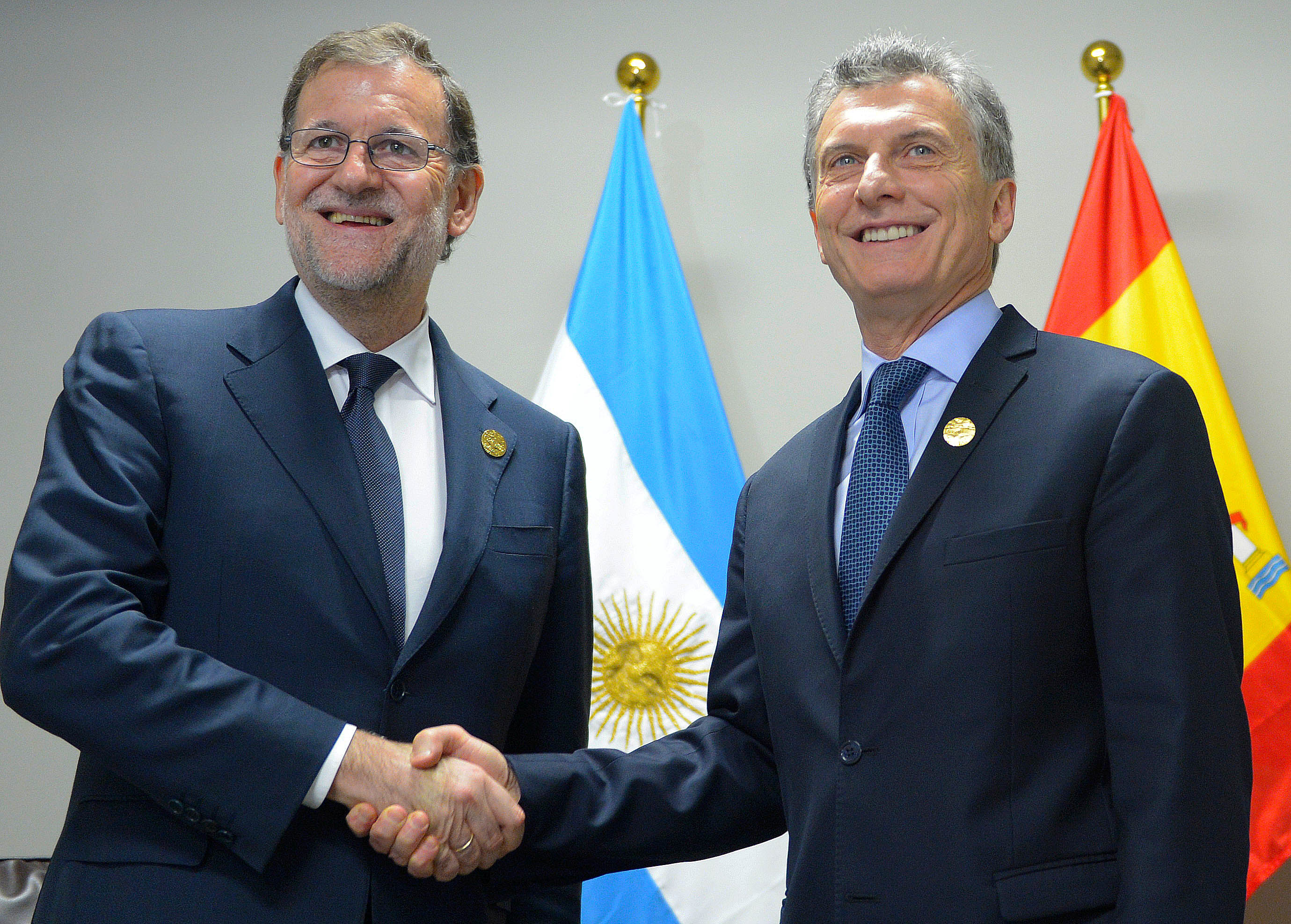
Prime Minister Mariano Rajoy and President Mauricio Macri in Hangzhou, China; 2016.

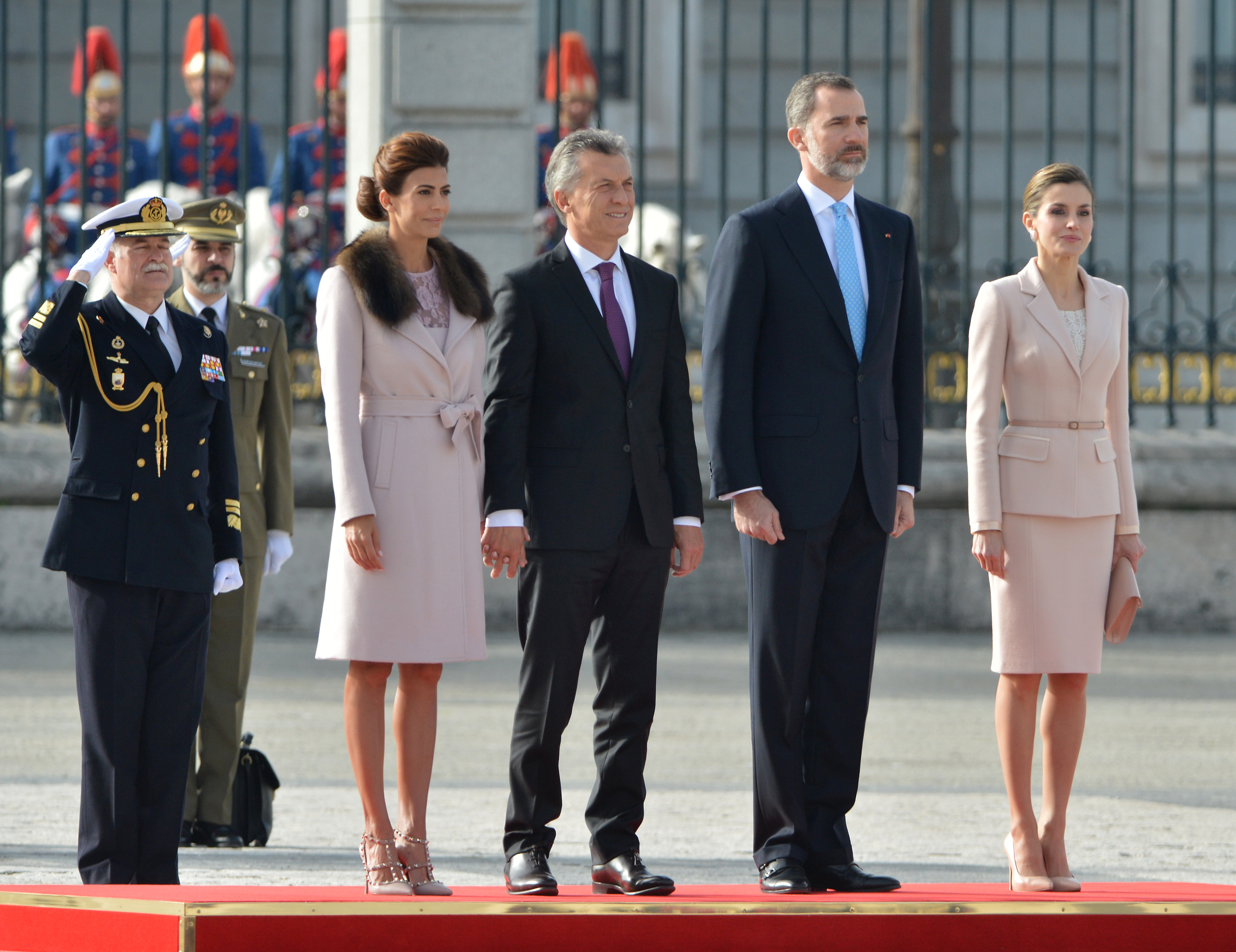
President Mauricio Macri and King Felipe VI in Madrid; 2017.

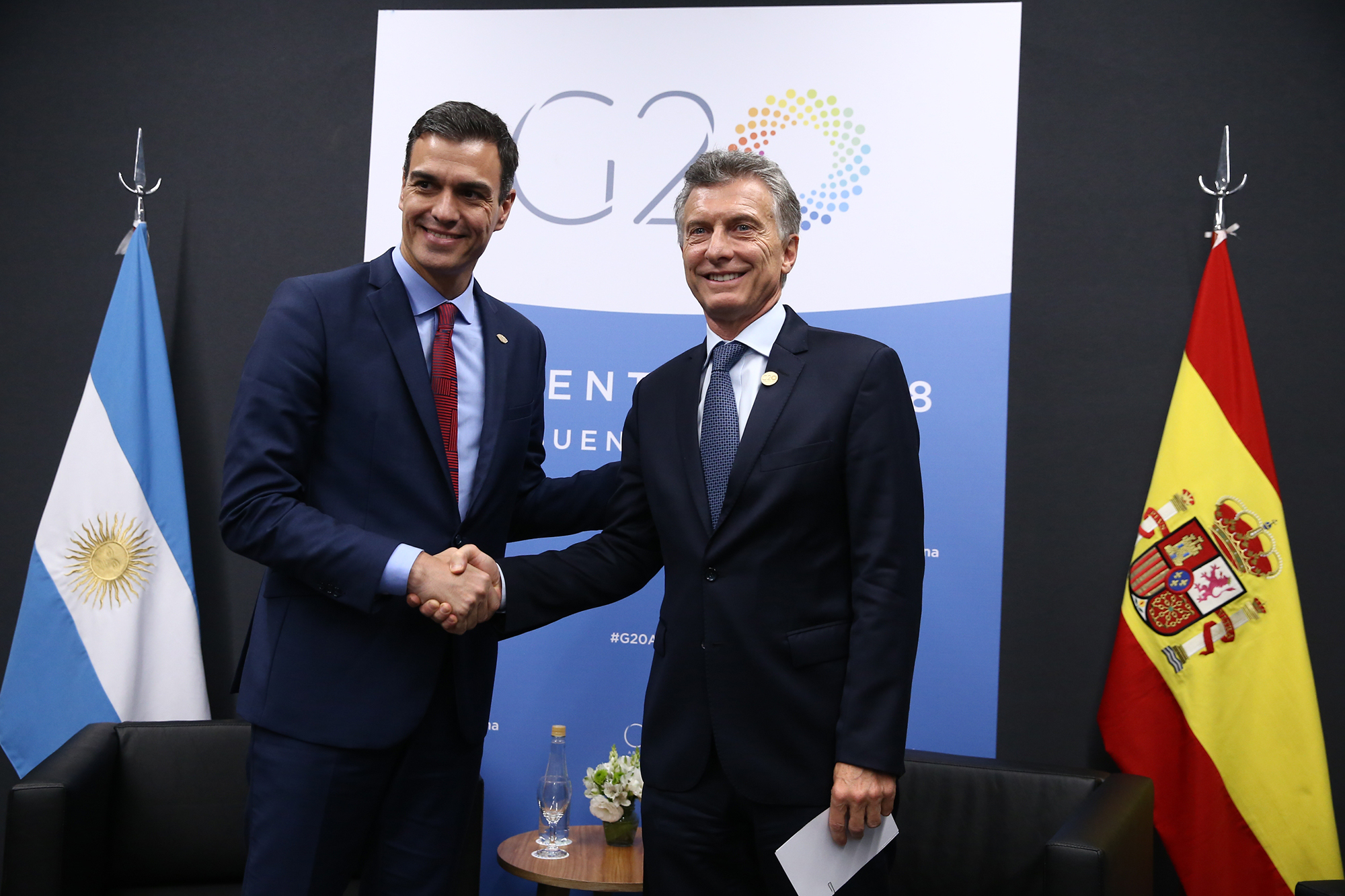
Prime Minister Pedro Sánchez and President Mauricio Macri in Buenos Aires; 2018.

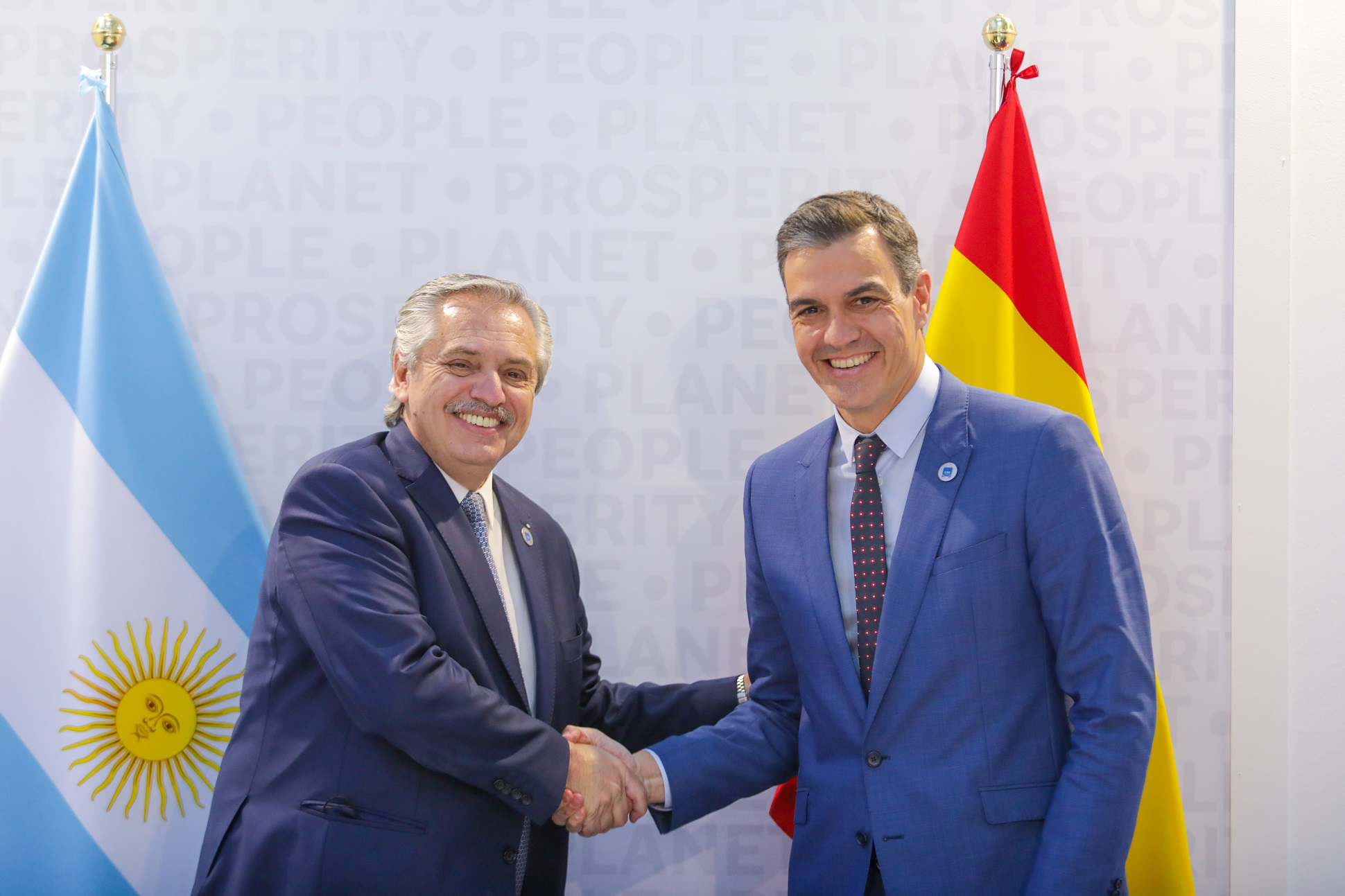
President Alberto Fernández and Prime Minister Pedro Sánchez in Rome; 2021.

== Cultural cooperation ==
The Monument to the Carta Magna and Four Regions of Argentina was donated by the Spanish community in 1910, on the occasion of the centenary of the May Revolution. Argentina hosts Spanish Cultural Centers in Buenos Aires, in Córdoba and in the Parque de España, Rosario. In addition, it also has mixed social and sports institutions, such as the Spanish Club of Rosario or the Hispano-Argentino Regatta Club, and Spanish is the common language of both countries.

Since May 2014, the Argentine cartoonist Quino, famous for his comic strip Mafalda, received the Princess of Asturias Award for Communication and Humanities. Later, since May 2017, the Argentine humorous-musical group Les Luthiers was also awarded.

Tango and flamenco are two Latin dance genres, recognized as intangible cultural heritage, being emblems of Argentine and Spanish culture respectively. Likewise, they have become popular among the societies of both countries with the exchange of music and dance artists.

In February 2020, a twinning tourist guide was established that unites the city of Córdoba in Spain with the counterpart Córdoba in Argentina, trying to take advantage of the aspects that both cities share and that transcend beyond the common name that identifies them, covering linguistic points and cultural.

Since June 2022, the twinning of the paths of the Cura Brochero in Córdoba (Argentina) with that of Santiago de Compostela in Galicia (Spain) began. The agreement will have as its main objective to promote the exchange of knowledge on Christian pilgrimages between both communities.

In January 2023, Argentina sought at FITUR to capitalize its historic relationship with Spain for tourism, forged, among other things, by the family ties that unite both countries. Subsequently, the signing of a twinning and cooperation agreement between the municipalities of Salta (Argentina) and Huelva (Spain) was established. The agreement was made with the aim of promoting the economic and social development of both regions through tourism, production, culture, and gastronomy. Likewise, in May of the same year, Salta was also twinned with the municipality of Huesca (Spain), since the gauchos pay homage to the same patron of the Fiestas de San Lorenzo.

== Agreements ==
Both nations have signed numerous bilateral agreements such as an Air Transportation Agreement (1947); Agreement on the Elimination of Visas (1947); Agreement on Migration (1960); Agreement on Cultural Cooperation (1971); Agreement on Scientific and Technical Cooperation (1972); Agreement on Economic Cooperation (1974); Extradition Treaty (1987); Agreement on the Promotion and Protection of Investments (1991); Agreement on mutual recognition of Drivers License (2002); Agreement on the Avoidance of Double-Taxation (2013) and an Agreement to strengthen bilateral cooperation in innovation and technological development (2022).

== Transportation ==
There are direct flights between Argentina and Spain through the following airlines: Aerolíneas Argentinas, Air Europa, Iberia and Level.

== Trade and investment ==
In 2017, trade between Argentina and Spain totaled €2.7 billion Euros. Argentina's main exports to Spain include: animal based products, frozen fish, crustaceans and sea mussels, copper and organic chemicals. Spain's exports to Argentina include: automobile components and equipment, electrical material and pharmaceuticals. Spanish multinational companies such Banco Bilbao Vizcaya Argentaria, Banco Santander, Mapfre, Telefónica and Zara operate in Argentina.

Spain is the second largest investor in Argentina after the United States, totalling to more than €9.8 million Euros in 2018.

== Resident diplomatic missions ==
of Argentina in Spain

- Madrid (Embassy)
- Madrid (Consulate-General)
- Barcelona (Consulate-General)
- Vigo (Consulate-General)
- Cádiz (Consulate)
- Palma (Consulate)
- Santa Cruz de Tenerife (Consulate)

of Spain in Argentina

- Buenos Aires (Embassy)
- Buenos Aires (Consulate-General)
- Bahía Blanca (Consulate-General)
- Córdoba (Consulate-General)
- Mendoza (Consulate-General)
- Rosario (Consulate-General)

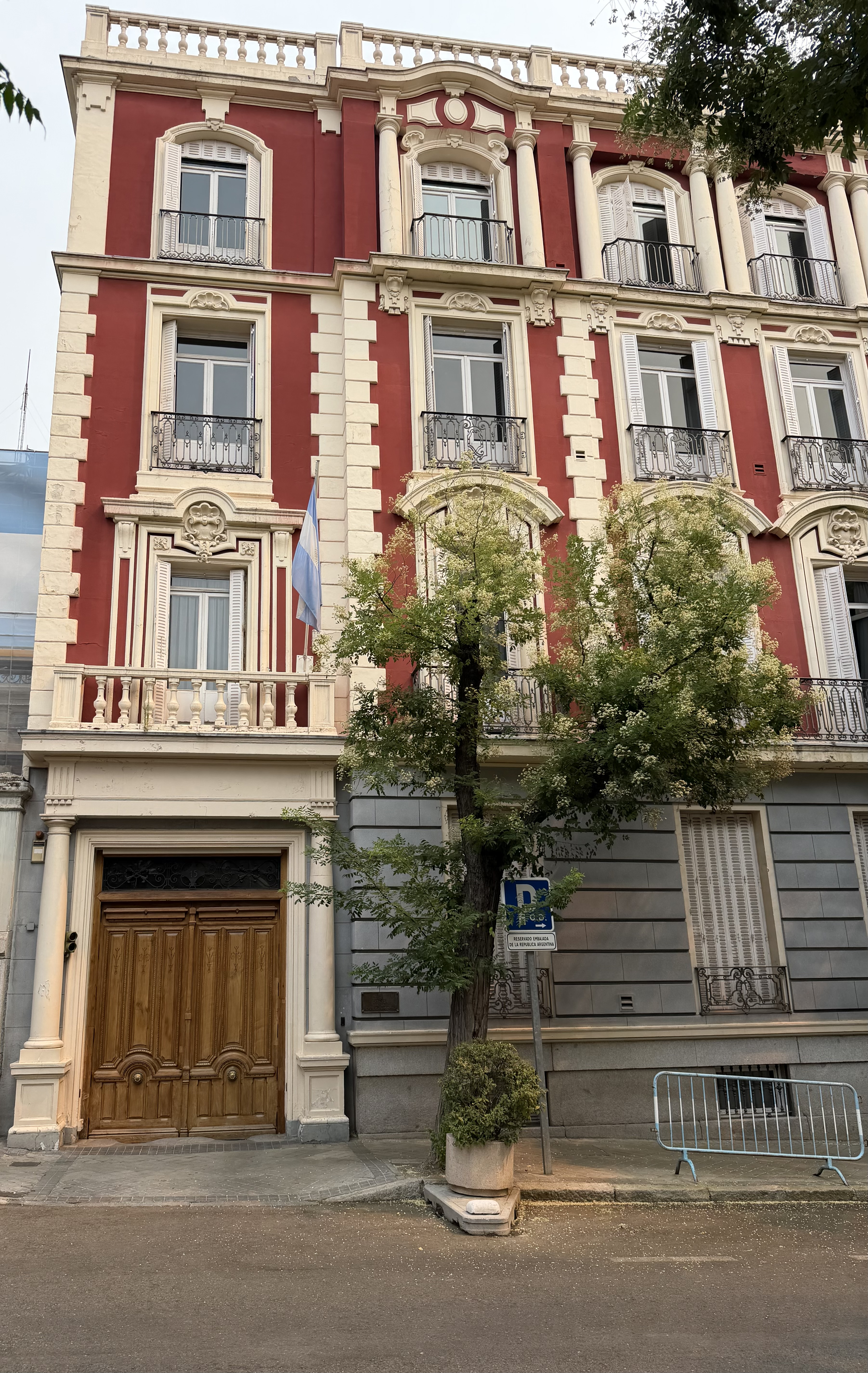
Embassy of Argentina in Madrid

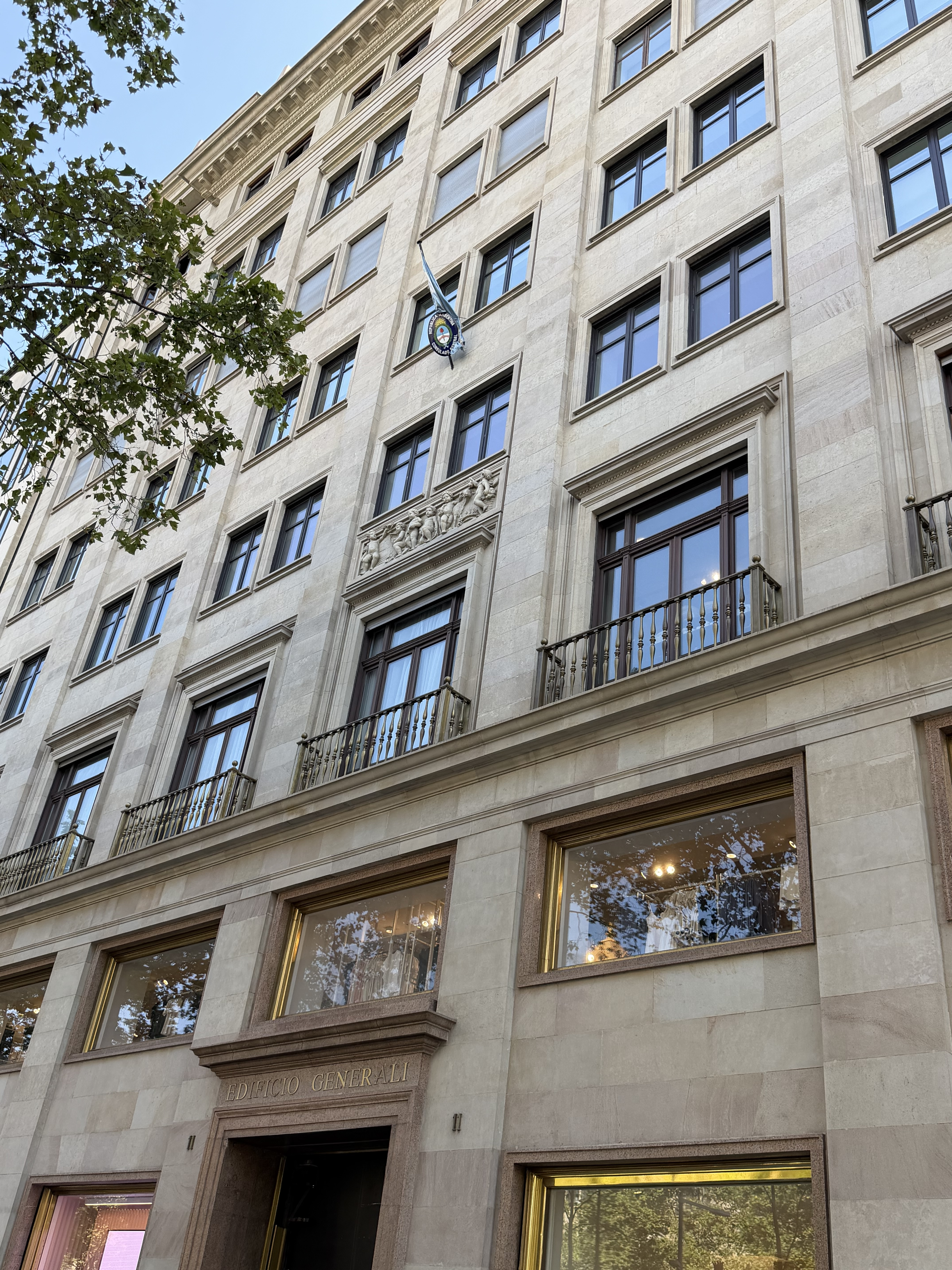
Consulate-General of Argentina in Barcelona

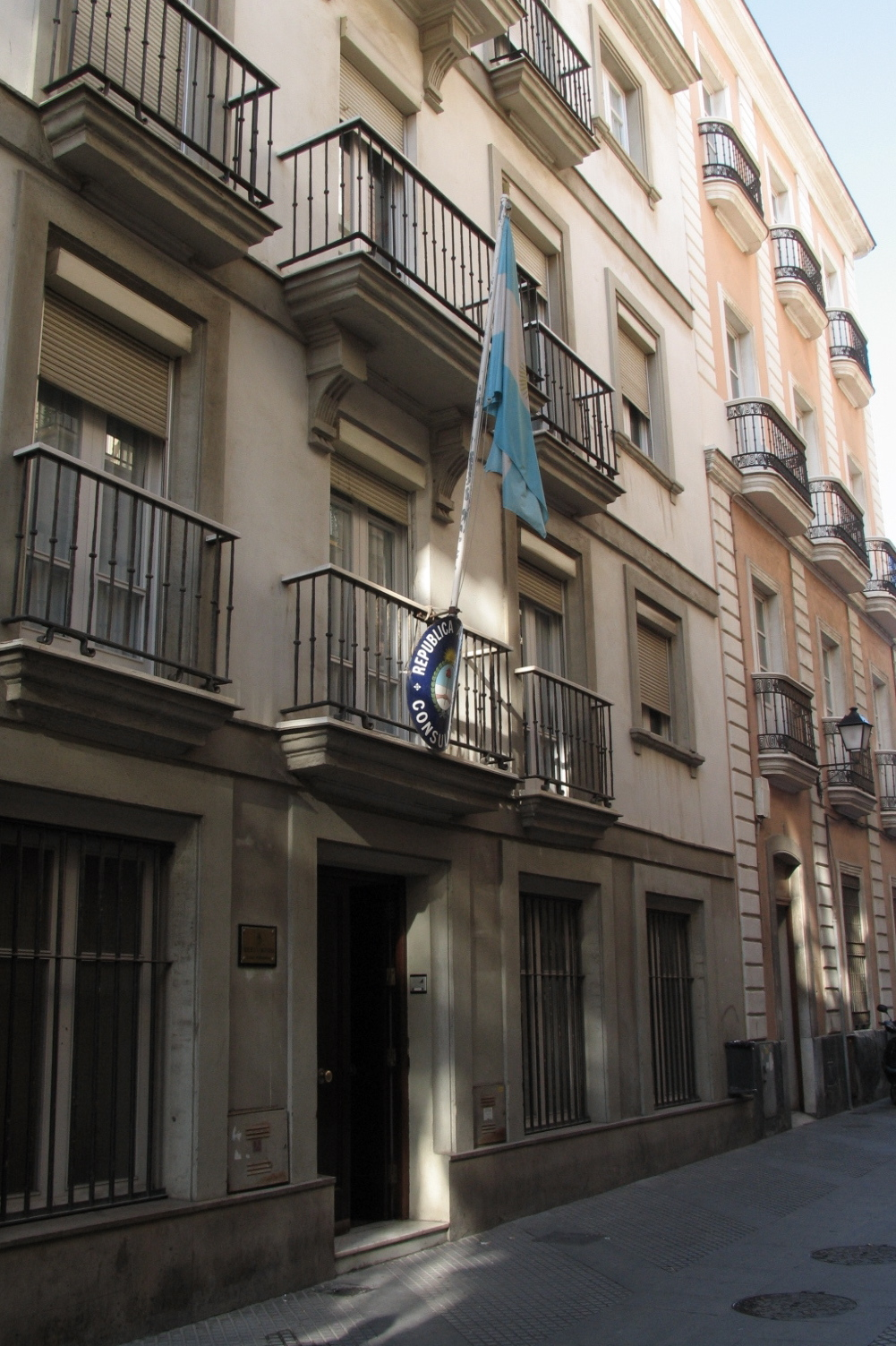
Consulate of Argentina in Cádiz
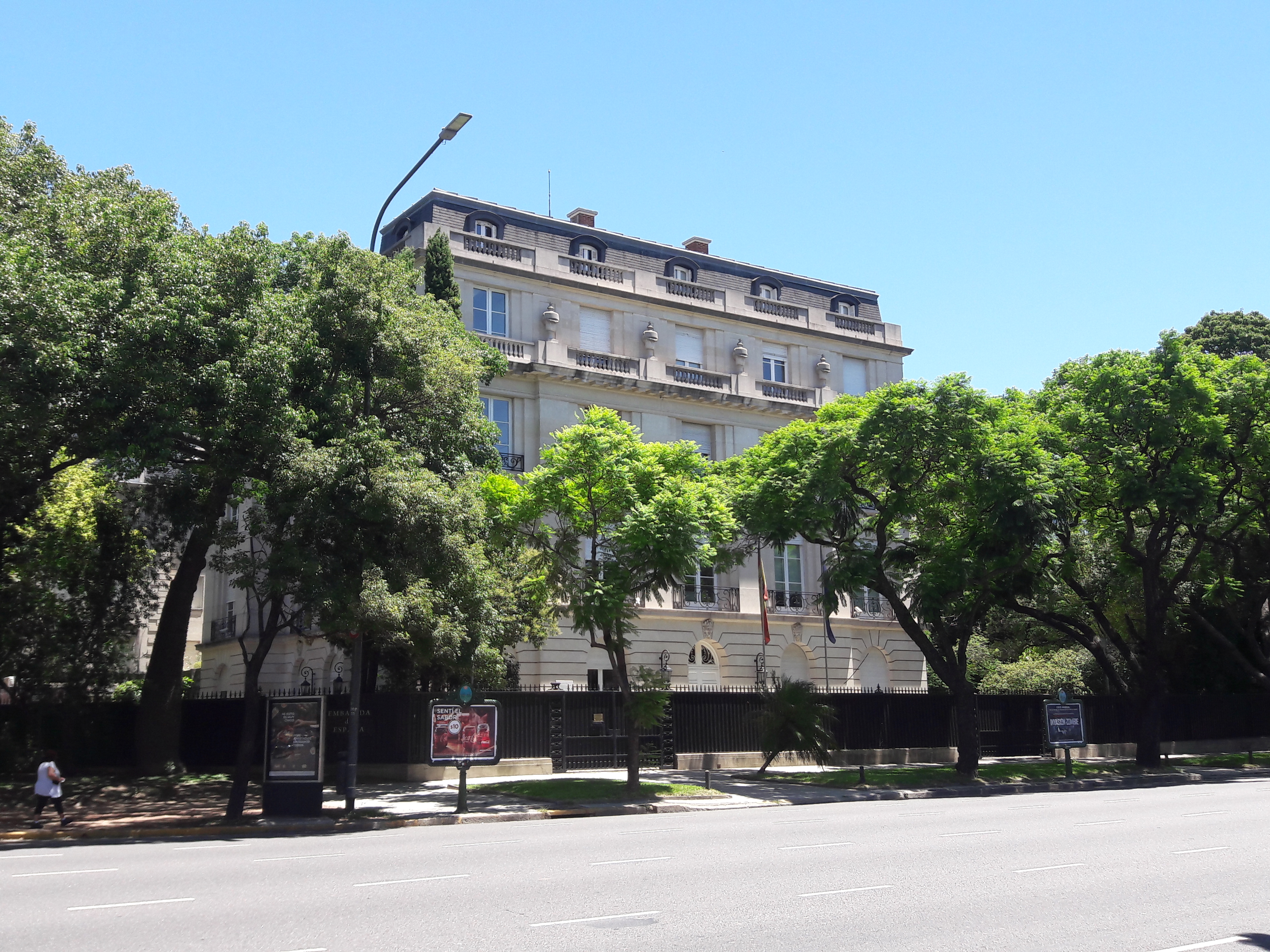
Embassy of Spain in Buenos Aires

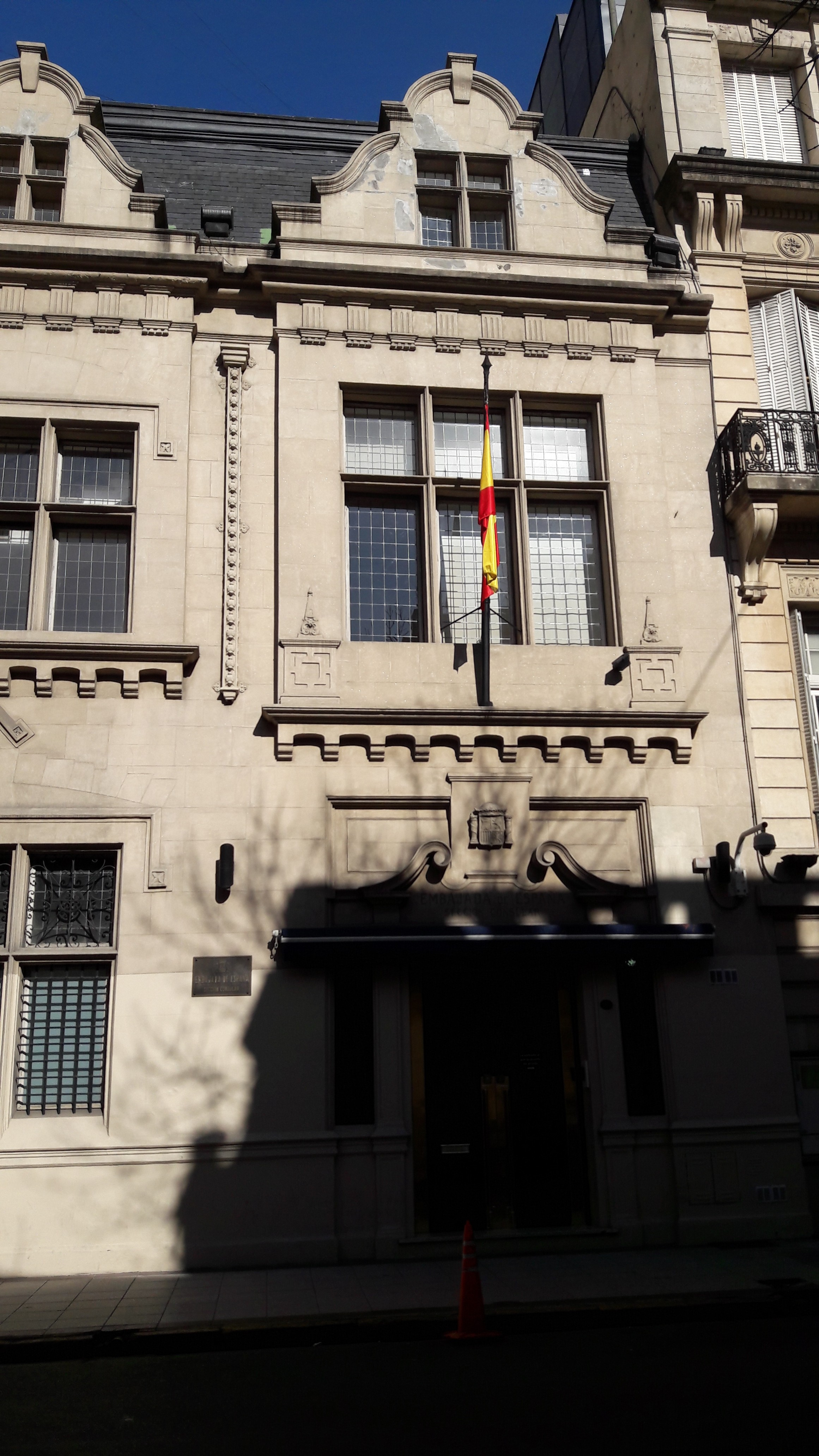
Consulate-General of Spain in Buenos Aires

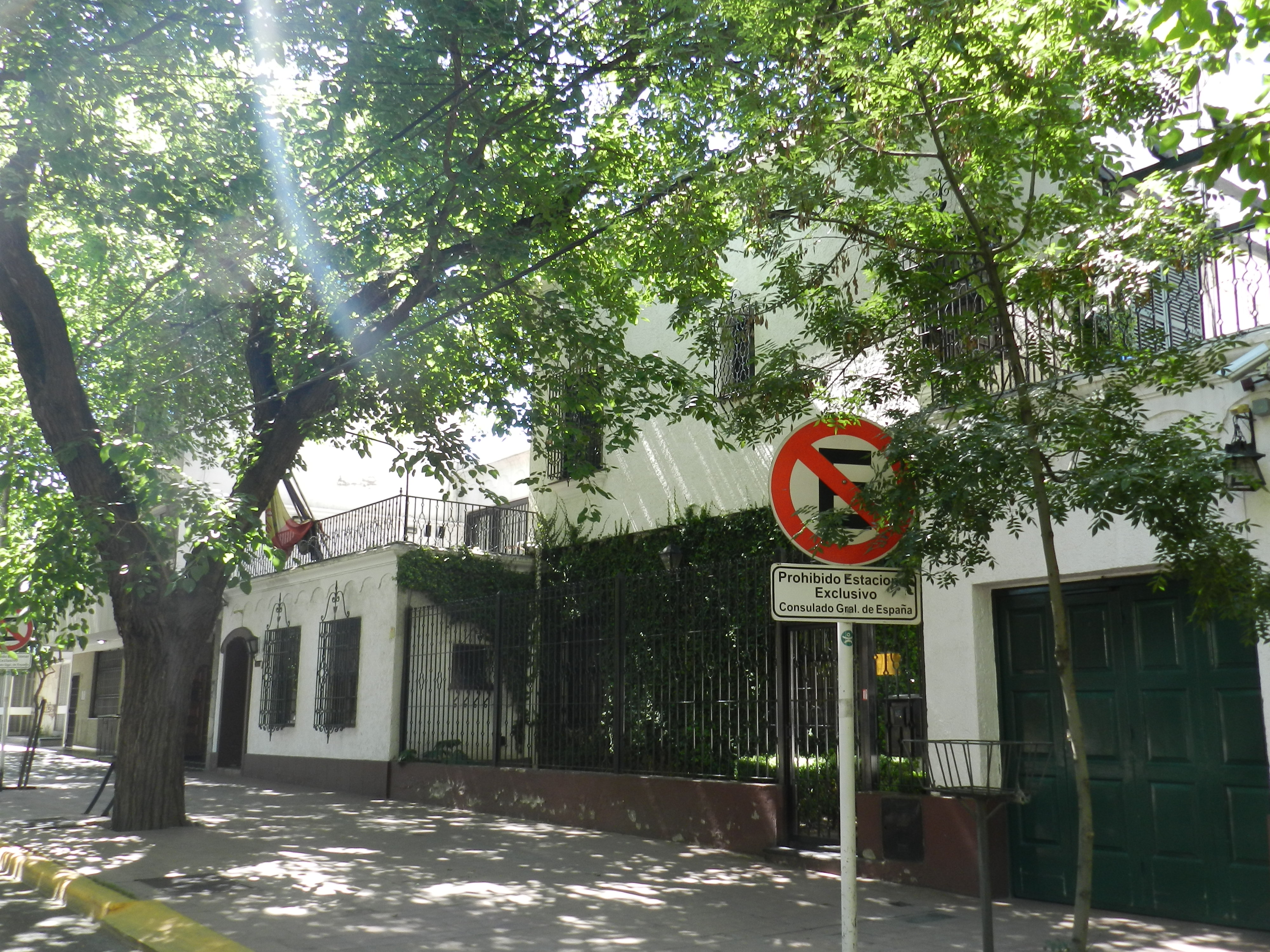
Consulate-General of Spain in Mendoza

== See also ==
- Argentines in Spain
- Spanish Argentines
