= Bolivians in Spain =

Ethnic group in Spain

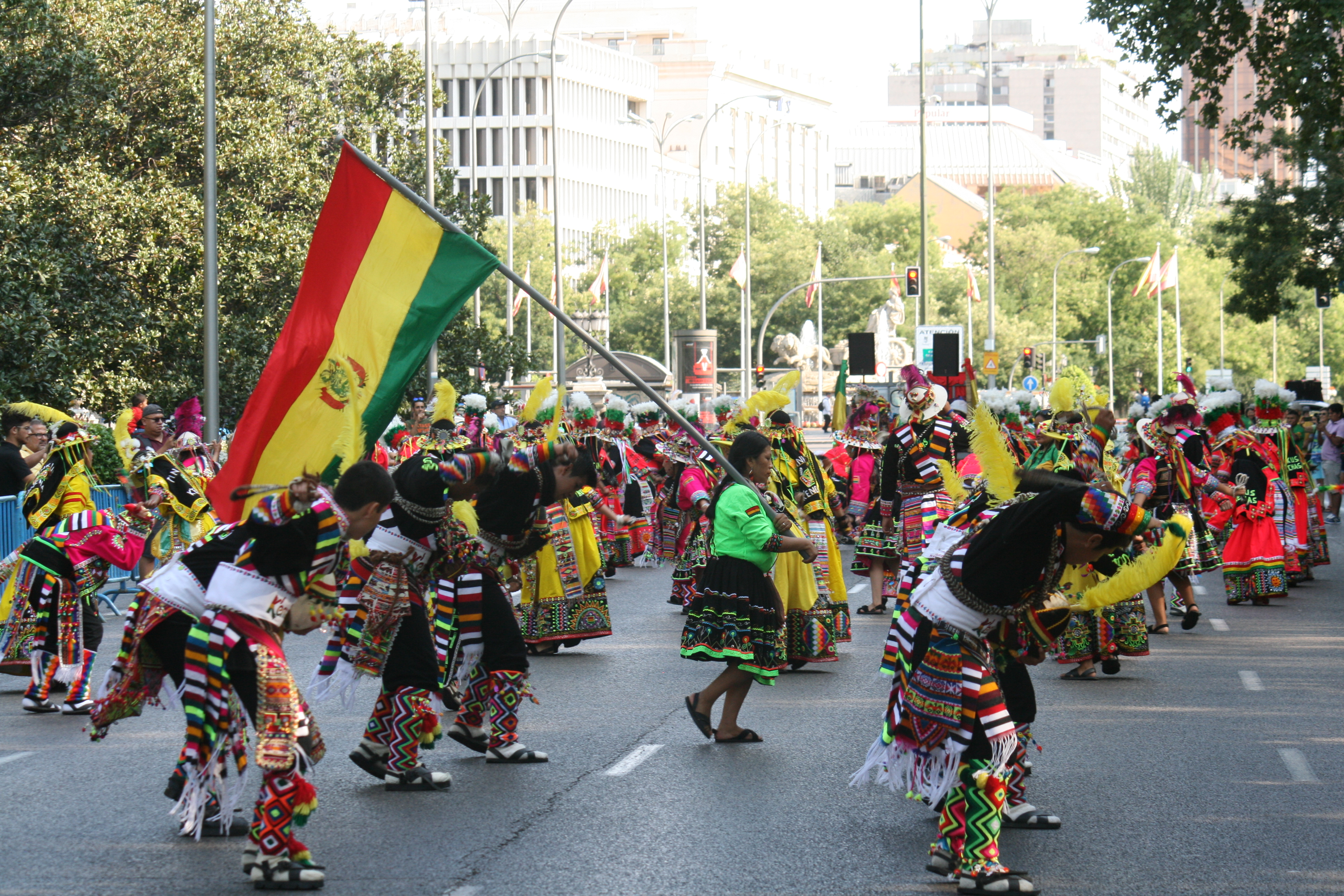
Bolivians celebrate the day of the Virgin of Urkupiña at the Paseo del Prado in Madrid, 2018

Bolivians in Spain are the largest Bolivian community outside of the Americas, and one of the largest Bolivian diasporic communities outside of the country. The most Bolivians who live in Spain emigrated from the departments of La Paz and Cochabamba, which are mostly populated by indigenous people who often speak Quechua or Aymara as their native language. Most Spanish residents of Bolivian origin live in Catalonia and Madrid.

Bolivians in Spain arrived mostly in the 2000s, during the economic boom of Spain. The economic crisis in Bolivia, together with the political instability it faced until the election of Evo Morales, triggered a massive emigration of Bolivians to the European country, as the size of the Bolivian community grew from 15,000 people in 2002 to 237,000 in 2008. Then, due to the economic crisis in Spain, some Bolivians left.

As of 2025, 193,275 Bolivians live in Spain. The community grows steadily again since 2015, although in a slow pace, as Bolivians need visa to enter Spain unlike its neighbors.

Most Bolivians in Spain live in Catalonia, Community of Madrid, Basque Country, Valencian Community, Andalusia and Murcia Region.

== History ==
Historical population
Year	Pop.	±%
2002	15,121	—
2003	30,698	+103.0%
2004	55,123	+79.6%
2005	96,461	+75.0%
2006	136,445	+41.5%
2007	199,932	+46.5%
2008	237,195	+18.6%
2009	230,112	−3.0%
2010	216,019	−6.1%
2011	201,580	−6.7%
2012	188,698	−6.4%
2013	176,413	−6.5%
2014	161,627	−8.4%
2015	156,711	−3.0%
2016	156,532	−0.1%
2017	158,864	+1.5%
2018	162,731	+2.4%
2019	167,672	+3.0%
2020	173,464	+3.5%
2021	176,757	+1.9%
2022	178,714	+1.1%
2023	183,734	+2.8%
2024	189,285	+3.0%
2025	193,275	+2.1%
Source: National Statistics Institute (Spain)

The presence of Bolivians in Spain dates back in the 20th century. For example, the current president of Bolivia, Rodrigo Paz, spent his childhood in Spain, as Spain was often a destination for political exiles in the 1960s to 1980s. In 1998, 1,249 Bolivians lived in Spain.

=== 2000s ===
In the 2000s, the Bolivian community in Spain saw explosive growth as poverty in Bolivia and demand for workers in Spain triggered a large wave of migration from Bolivia to Spain. The Bolivian community grew from 15,121 people in 2002 to 237,195 people in 2008. The migratory boom took off after 2003 and there were more women than men. Women often worked in domestic services, while men worked in the construction sector. As of a 2007 study, 43% of the working Bolivians worked as domestic carers or providing personal services, and another 16,2% was working in construction or mining, while 71,9% worked without a contract.

According to the Bolivian organisations in Spain, some of the triggers who led in the large growth of the Bolivian community in Spain was the poverty and instability in Bolivia, as well as the visa free travel that was available then and the increased frequency of flights between Bolivia and Spain. Many Bolivians often worked at least six days to provide money for their expenses and to send money to relatives in Bolivia.

Women consisted the majority of the migrants. A journalist of the Spanish newspaper El Periódico noted that the Bolivian community, from being a marginal community, became a major one thanks to explosive growth similar to that of the Ecuadorian and Argentine community in Spain in the early 2000s.

As Spain was accessible without a visa until April 2007, passport demand in Bolivia increased a lot by 2006, as many people applied for passports to leave for Spain. Many passport offices worked in double shifts to cover the increased demand. Many Bolivians arrived to Spain as tourists, and then sought employment, often without papers. Due to this phenomenon, according to a Reuters article in 2007, out of around 800 Bolivians who arrived to Spain in a day in October 2006, roughly 70 were turned back to Bolivia by the authorities.

The migration of Bolivians to Spain peaked in 2007, when at least 18,000 Bolivians left for Spain in March. The reason for the very high amount of emigration in this month was the announcement that after 1 April 2007 a visa would be required to enter the EU, so Bolivian migrants tried to arrive in Spain before this requirement took effect.

In the late 2000s, one problem that the Bolivian community faced was that many of its members lived under an irregular status. According to the Bolivian embassy, in 2009, 80% of the Bolivians hadn't regularised their migration status, and lived without papers. By 2013, 90% of the Bolivians in Spain had regularised their migration status and a few had already began to obtain Spanish nationality.

The economic crisis in Spain triggered many Bolivians to return to Bolivia or seek employment elsewhere in Latin America or Europe.

=== 2010s-today ===
Bolivians in Spain reached 156,000 people in 2015, when the trend of decline stopped. In 2016, the Bolivian community in Spain began to grow again with new arrivals. In 2025 they had increased slowly year after year to 193 thousand. However, due to the visa requirement for Bolivians to enter Spain, which is still in place since 2007, the growth is quite slow, compared to the neighboring nations who don't need it.

== Demographic indicators ==
Thousands of children were born to Bolivian mothers who live in Spain, however, the number of births to Bolivian mothers per year has declined substantially since 2009 due to the aging of the Bolivian community and the fact that the community grows in a much slower pace due to the visa requirements. In 2009 5,156 babies were born to Bolivian mothers, while by 2024 the number had declined to 1,981.
