= Spanish Argentines =

Ethnic group

Hispano-argentinos (Spanish) Hispano-arxentinos (Galician) Hispano-argentinarrak (Basque) Hispano-argentins (Catalan)
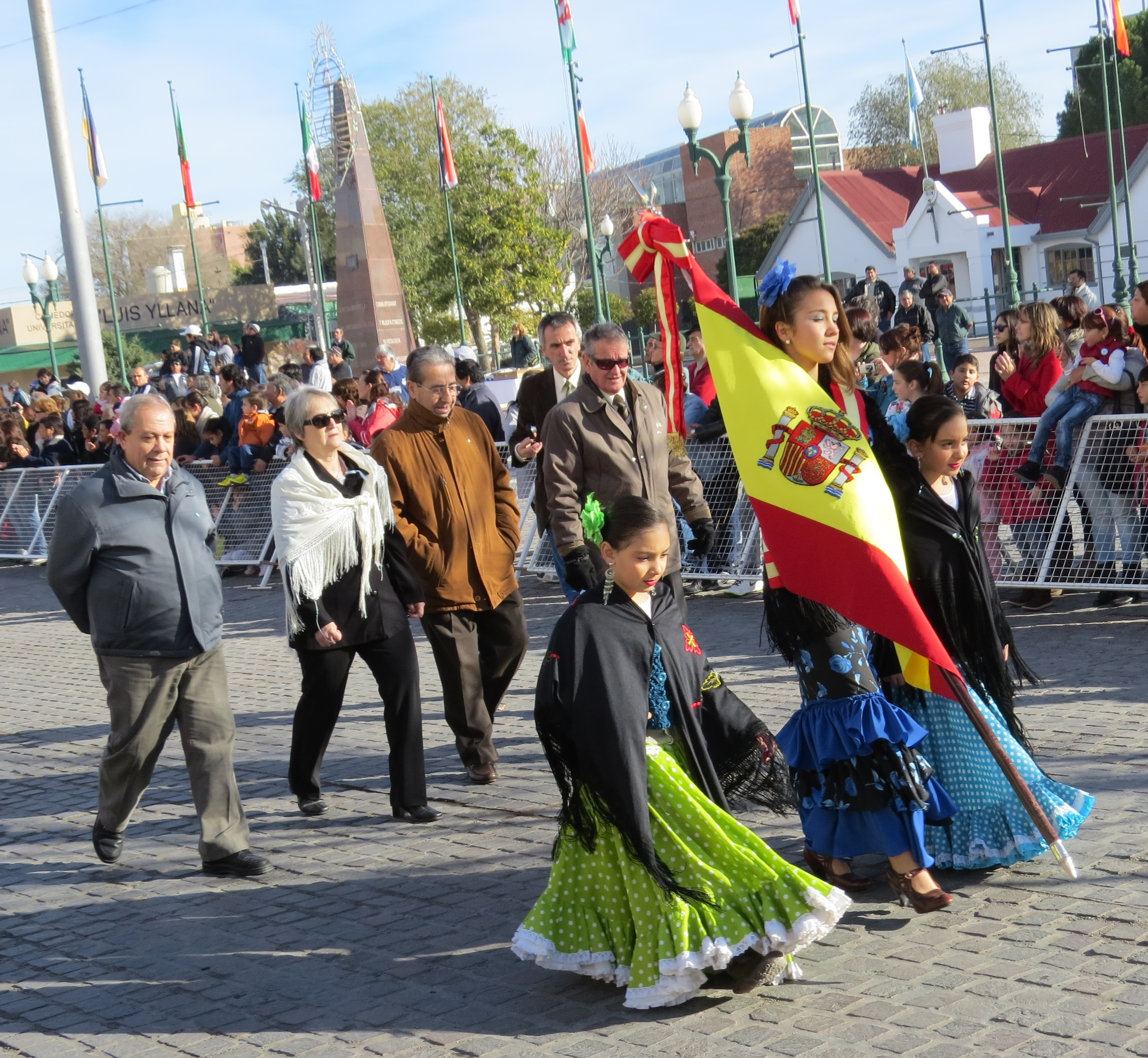
- Spanish community from Trelew (Chubut) during a parade for May 25.

Total population
- 68,748 (by birth, 2023) + 20,000,000 (by ancestry, 2015); 43.4% of Argentina's population

Regions with significant populations
- Throughout Argentina (The Pampas, the New Cuyo, the Littoral, the Northwest and Patagonia)

Languages
- Majority: Spanish; Minority: Galician, Catalan, and Basque

Religion
- Majority: Roman Catholicism; Minority: Irreligion

Related ethnic groups
- Other Spaniards, Sephardic Jews, Portuguese Argentines, Romani Argentines

Spanish Argentines (Spanish: hispano-argentinos) are Argentine-born citizens who are predominantly or totally of Spanish descent. The arrival of Spanish emigrants in Argentina took place first in the period before Argentina's independence from Spain, and again in large numbers during the late 19th and early 20th centuries. Between the 15th and 19th centuries, the Spanish Empire was the sole colonial power in the territories that became Argentina after the 1816 Argentine declaration of independence. Thus, before 1850, the vast majority of European settlers in Argentina were from Spain and they carried the Spanish colonial administration, including religious affairs, government, and commercial business. A substantial Spanish descended Criollo population gradually built up in the new cities, while some mixed with the amerindians (Mestizos), with the slave population sub-saharan descended (Mulattoes) or with other European immigrants. Currently, a large part of Argentines can be considered Criollos or Castizos.

Since a great portion of the immigrants to Argentina before the mid-19th century were of Spanish descent, and a significant part of the late-19th century/early-20th century immigrants to Argentina were Spaniards, almost all Argentines are at least partly of Spanish ancestry. Indeed, the 20 most common surnames in Argentina are Spanish. The prevalence and the numerous shared cultural aspects between Argentina and Spain (the Spanish language, Roman Catholicism, Criollo/Hispanic traditions) has been mixed with other European and Latin Mediterranean cultures with the immigration to Argentina during the 20th century. This has led to a hybrid Argentine culture which is among the most distinct from traditional Spanish culture in Latin America. Furthermore, a large proportion of Spanish immigration to Argentina during the 20th century was from the North Western region of Galicia, which has a separate language and distinct culture from other parts of Spain.

== History ==
The interplay between Argentine and Spanish culture has a long and complex history. Spanish settlements date back to 16th century, and from then on, many Criollo Spaniards populated the area of Argentina, some of whom intermarried with non-Spaniards. Spain established a permanent colony on the site of Buenos Aires in 1580, although initial settlement was primarily overland from Peru. The Spanish further integrated Argentina into their vast empire by establishing the Vice Royalty of Rio de la Plata in 1776, and Buenos Aires became a flourishing port. Argentina would become a crucial part of the Spanish Empire in South America.

The Argentine independence movement drastically changed earlier Argentine-Spanish relations. The Argentine movement for independence from Spain began in the powerful city of Buenos Aires on May 25, 1810, and the whole new country formally declared independence from Spain on July 9, 1816, in the city of San Miguel de Tucumán. Following the defeat of the Spanish, centralist and federalist groups engaged in a lengthy conflict to determine the future of the nation of Argentina. Prior to its independence, Spaniards in Argentina who were against the rule of the Spanish Empire and desired their independence came to be known as Argentines, and those who were opposed to independence continued to be identified as Spaniards. But a few generations after independence, and particularly after recent immigration, most Argentines began to see themselves as purely Argentine out of pride in their new developing nation.

== Spanish immigration ==
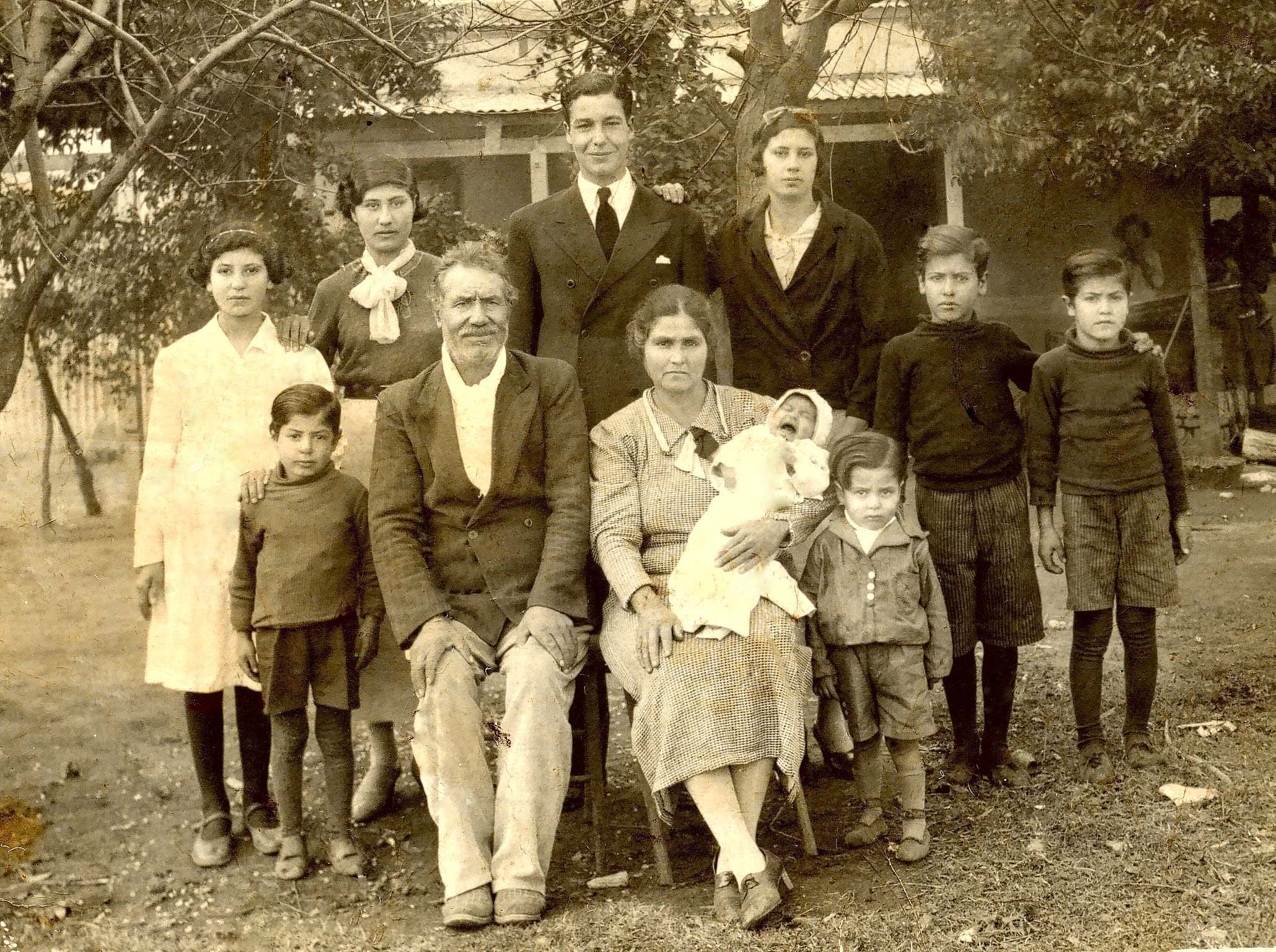
A Spanish immigrant family in the town of Arias, Córdoba.

Percentage of Spanish immigrants in the provinces and territories of Argentina, according to the 1914 Argentine census.

In the post-colonial period (1832-1950), there would be a further influx of Spanish immigrants to Argentina from all over Spain during the Great European immigration wave to Argentina, after the creation of the modern Argentine state. Between 1857 and 1960, 2.2 million Spanish people emigrated to Argentina, mostly from Galicia, the Basque Country, Cantabria, and Catalonia in northern Spain, while significantly smaller numbers of immigrants also arrived from Extremadura in southern Spain.

Galicians make up 70% of the Spanish post-colonial immigrant population in Argentina. The city with the world's second largest number of Galician people is Buenos Aires. Immigration from Galicia was so notable that today all Spaniards, regardless of their origin within Spain, are referred to as gallegos (Galicians) in Argentina. The Argentine stereotype about gallegos is that they are dull, stubborn and stingy.

Roughly 10-15% of the Argentine population are descended from Basque people, both Spanish and French, and are described as Basque Argentines. They gather in several Basque cultural centers in most of the large cities in the country. A common practice among Argentines of Basque origin is to identify themselves "French-Basques". This is because of French culture being considered more "fashionable" than Spanish among the average Argentine.

In 2013, there were 92,453 Spanish citizens born in Spain living in Argentina and another 288,494 Spanish citizens born in Argentina.

Many of the Argentine migrants to Spain are the descendants of Spaniards or Italians who can easily acquire European citizenship under laws of return.

== Modern times ==
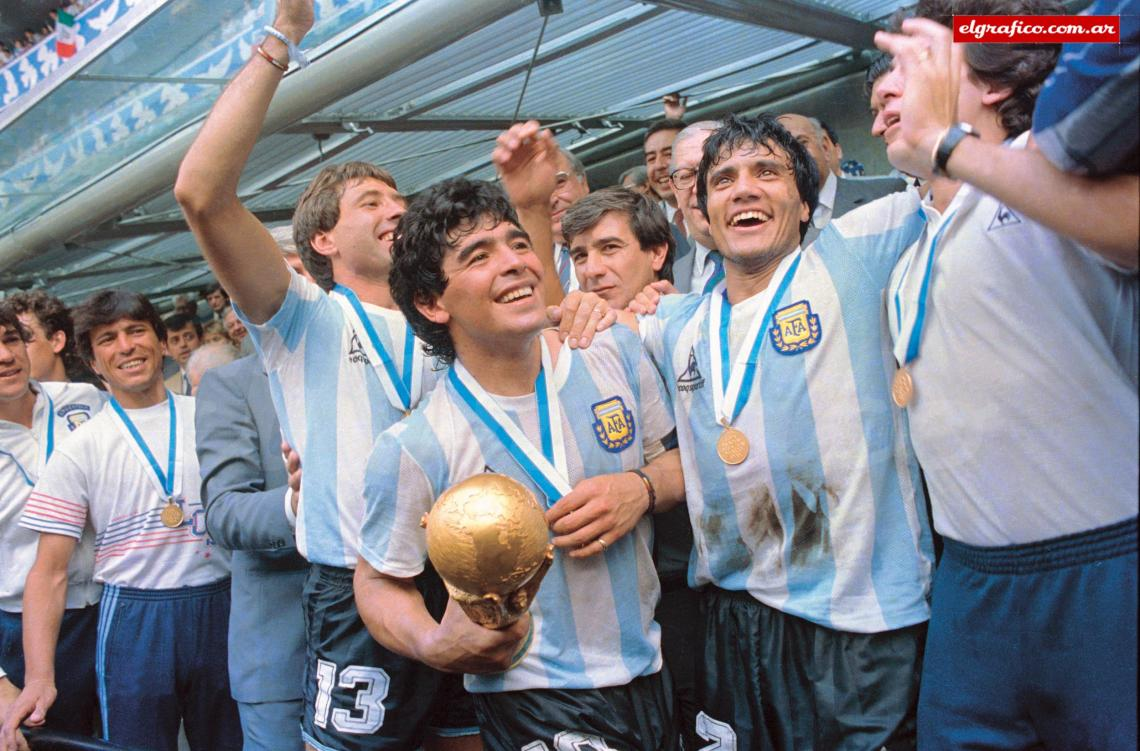
Diego Armando Maradona was a descendant of Galician immigrants.

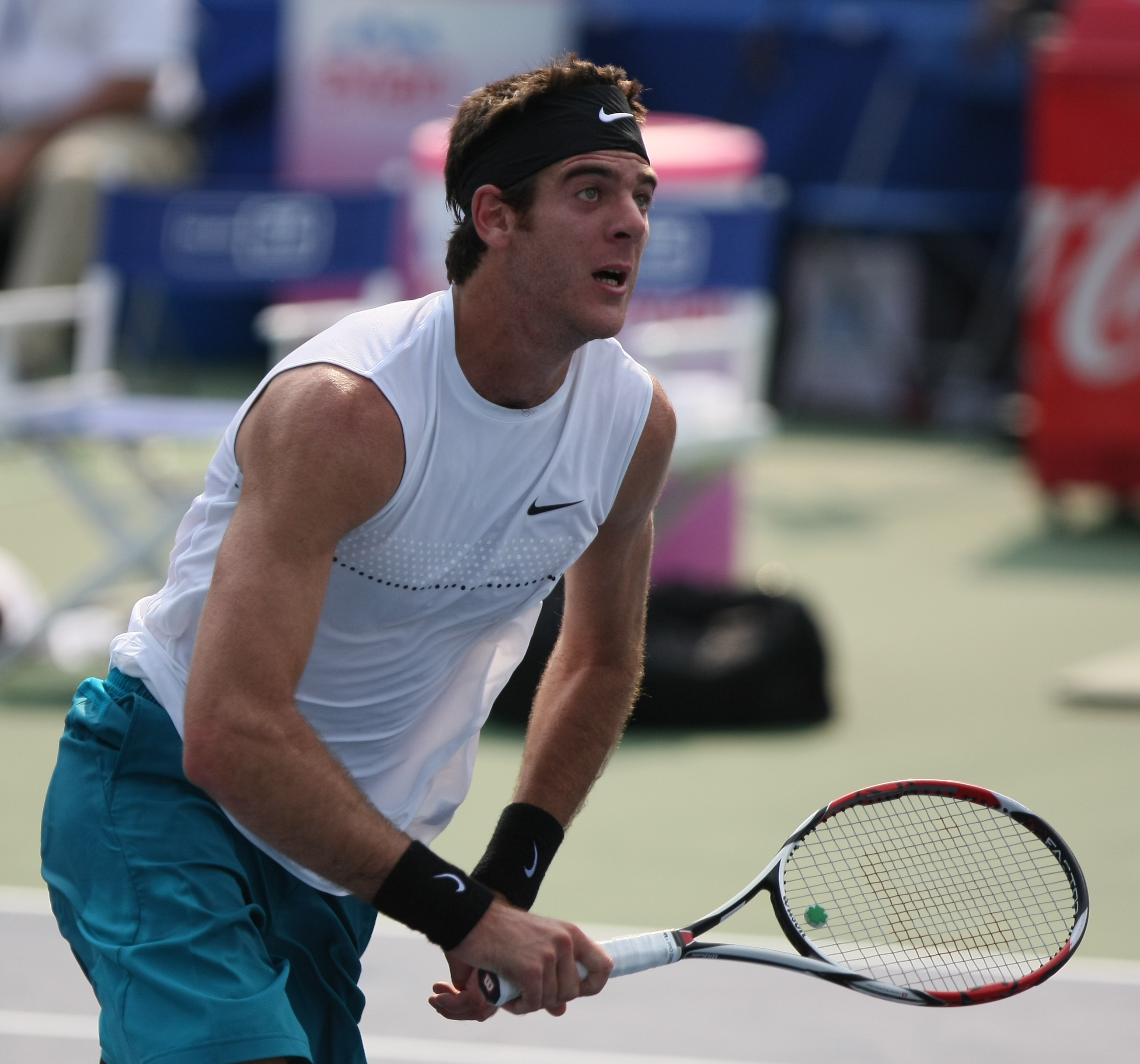
Juan Martín del Potro, the most recognized Argentine tennis player.

While there continues to be strong interest among the population in European affairs and their European heritage, the Argentine culture today varies considerably from the Spanish much like the American or Australian cultures vary from the British.

Spanish culture has left a great mark on modern Argentine culture. Bilateral relations have always been of a privileged strategic nature. Meanwhile, prospective and all-round cooperation also experienced periods of acute disagreement. In recent years, Madrid diplomacy has been trying to regain its shaken prestige and influence over Argentina and its closest neighbors. The most significant preparations for this were made during the celebration of the 500th anniversary of the discovery of America. However, despite some "warming" in relations between the countries, the former level of trust and contacts is not observed. Attempts at cultural cooperation face two significant obstacles. Firstly, Spain does not have a sufficient amount of free funds that must be invested in lending to the Argentine economy, and secondly, the “syndrome of betrayal” that Argentines feel in relation to Spain is not likely to be easily overcome.

== Figures ==
Yale university report states that 2,080,000 Spanish immigrants entered Argentina between 1857 and 1940. Spain provided 31.4% (Italy 44.9%) of all immigrants in that period. Nevertheless, due to prior Spanish immigration occurring throughout the colonial period, around 20 million Argentines are descendants of Spanish to some degree, with the 20 most common surnames in the country being all from Spain.

Another report (Republica Argentina (1998) gives net migration data as follows:

Net Spanish migration to Argentina 1857 - 1976
| Year period | Spanish immigrants |
|---|---|
| 1857–1860 | 1,819 |
| 1861–1870 | 15,567 |
| 1871–1880 | 24,706 |
| 1881–1890 | 134,492 |
| 1891–1900 | 73,551 |
| 1901–1910 | 488,174 |
| 1911–1920 | 181,478 |
| 1921–1930 | 232,637 |
| 1931–1940 | 11,286 |
| 1941–1950 | 110,899 |
| 1951–1960 | 98,801 |
| 1961–1970 | 9,514 |
| 1971–1976 | -2,784 |
| Total | 1,380,140 |

=== Spanish-born in Argentina in 2010 ===
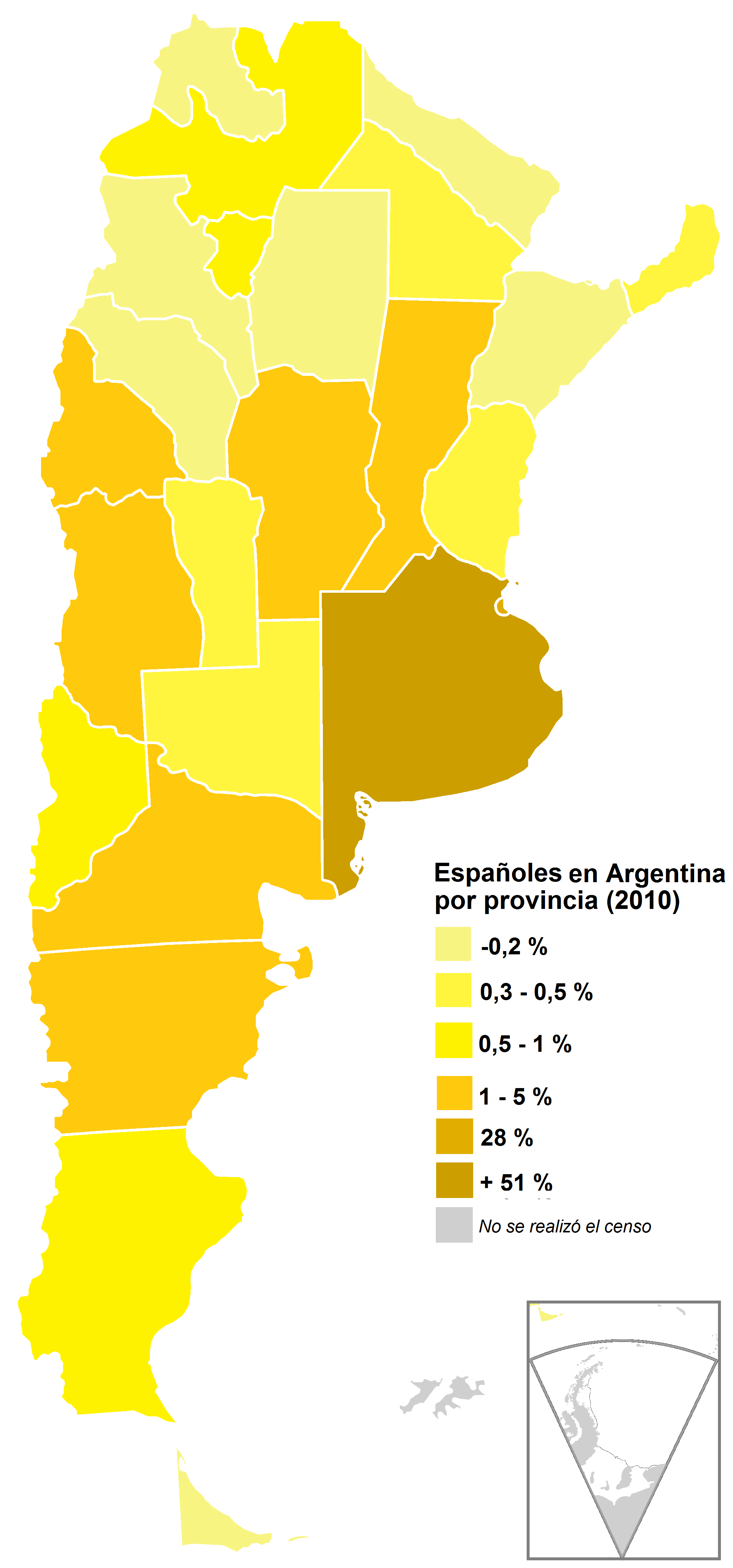
Percentage of Spanish-born in Argentina by province according to the 2010 census.

The 2010 Argentine census recorded 94,030 people born in Spain. The following table shows the distribution in the 23 provinces and the capital:

| Rank | Province | Born in Spain | % |
|---|---|---|---|
| 1 | Buenos Aires Province | 48,019 | 51.06% |
| 2 | Buenos Aires (CABA) | 26,282 | 28.00% |
| 3 | Mendoza | 4,130 | 4.39% |
| 4 | Santa Fe | 3,292 | 3.50% |
| 5 | Córdoba | 3,256 | 3.46% |
| 6 | Río Negro (Argentina) | 1,247 | 1.32% |
| 7 | San Juan | 1,187 | 1.26% |
| 8 | Chubut | 1,052 | 1.12% |
| 9 | Tucumán | 736 | 0.78% |
| 10 | Salta | 732 | 0.77% |
| 11 | Santa Cruz | 695 | 0.74% |
| 12 | Neuquén | 555 | 0.59% |
| 13 | Entre Ríos | 437 | 0.46% |
| 14 | Misiones | 327 | 0.35% |
| 15 | Chaco | 326 | 0.34% |
| 16 | San Luis | 304 | 0.32% |
| 17 | La Pampa | 283 | 0.30% |
| 18 | Santiago del Estero | 249 | 0.26% |
| 19 | Jujuy | 232 | 0.24% |
| 20 | Tierra del Fuego | 227 | 0.24% |
| 21 | Corrientes | 204 | 0.21% |
| 22 | Catamarca | 97 | 0.10% |
| 23 | La Rioja (Argentina) | 94 | 0.10% |
| 24 | Formosa | 71 | 0.07% |
| TOTAL | Argentina | 94,030 | 100 % |

== See also ==
- Argentina–Spain relations
- Argentines in Spain
- Criollo
- Castizo
- History of Argentine nationality
- European Argentines
- White Latin Americans
