= Argentines in Spain =

Immigration from Argentina to Spain

Argentines in Spain Argentinos en España
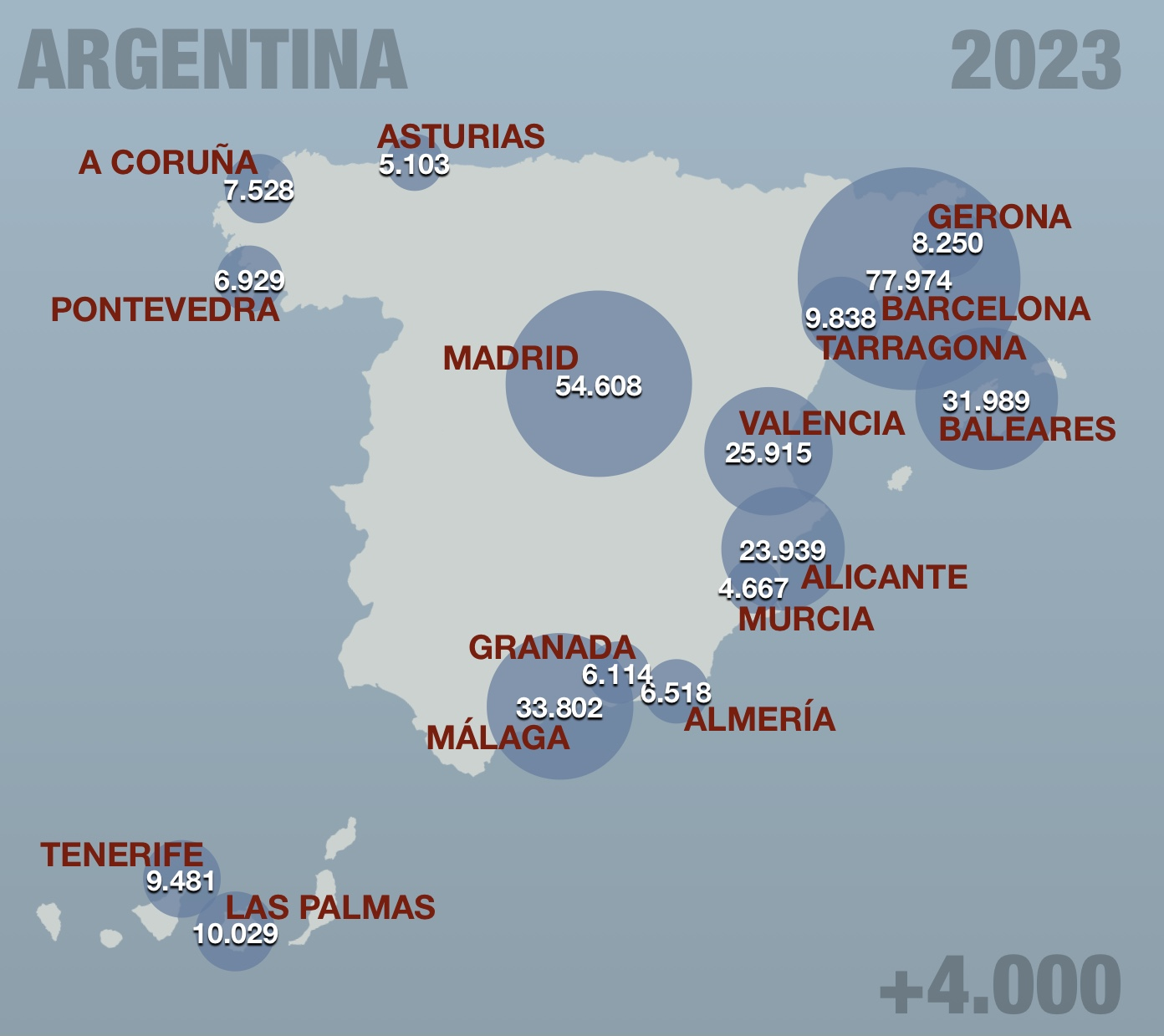
- Number of argentines per city in 2025.

Total population
- 148,585 (Argentines by birth) 450,883 (Population in Spain born in Argentina including those with dual Spanish or Italian citizenship). (Note: 293.037 is the size of the population in Spain born in Argentina (including those with dual Spanish citizenship). 97,000 is the size of the foreign population in Spain with Argentine citizenship (thus, no Spanish citizenship).)

Regions with significant populations
- Catalonia, Madrid, Valencian Community, Andalusia, Balearic Islands

Languages
- Spanish; Regional languages of Spain; Rioplatense Spanish

Religion
- Christianity; Judaism

Argentines in Spain are the largest community of Argentines abroad. In Spain, they represent one of the largest immigrant groups in the country.

Argentina is considered a country of immigrants, due to the different immigration waves that took place in the past, particularly during the 20th century. However, as a result of political, social and economic crisis that occurred in the country in the past decades, such as the Argentine military dictatorship (1976–1983), the riots of 1989, or the Argentine Great Depression (1998–2002), many Argentines chose emigration seeking stability and new opportunities. Common emigration destinations have been other countries in the Americas or the native countries of Argentine citizens' parents or grandparents (mainly Spain and Italy). As of January 2025, 450,883 people born in Argentina live in Spain. This is the biggest community of Argentines outside of their country.

In 2022, 97,000 Argentine-born residents of Spain had only Argentine citizenship. In 2025, the number of Argentine born residents of Spain with Argentine citizenship only grew to 148,585.

== History ==
=== Background ===
The ancestral origins of the Argentine nation show recent ancestors of generations predominantly as Spanish and Italian, but with strong French, Russian, Arab, German, Native American, African, Slavic and Semitic components. However, they faced very different legal circumstances that Spain and Italy had long before they joined the European Union migration policy, thousands of people a day come to the consulates of Spain to process the new nationality or obtain a visa. The Argentines are the fourth most numerous Latin American community in Spain, having recently been surpassed by Venezuelans.

== See also ==
- Argentina–Spain relations
- Immigration to Spain
- Spanish Argentine
- Italians in Spain
