= Brazilians in Spain =

Brazilians in Spain Brasileños en España Brasileiros em Espanha
Total population
- 189,712 (1 January 2025)

Regions with significant populations
- Madrid, Barcelona, Valencia, Santiago de Compostela

Languages
- Portuguese, Spanish

Religion
- Roman Catholicism

Related ethnic groups
- Brazilians in Portugal; Portuguese people in Spain

Brazilians in Spain are one of the biggest communities of the Brazilian diaspora. As of 2025, they are numbering 189,712 people.

The Brazilian community in Spain is quite big, despite that Brazilians speak Portuguese, unlike other Latin American countries, where the primary language is Spanish. However, the two languages are similar and the cultural affinities between the two countries are significant. Before the 1990s, immigration from Brazil was minimal. After the 1990s many Brazilians of all backgrounds and qualifications began to arrive in Spain.

== History ==
Before the 1980s Brazilians in Spain were mostly consisting of artists and political exiles. In the 1990s, many of the Brazilians who moved in Spain had a high education level, were generally urban and sought higher opportunities. In the 2000s, many migrants came from the working class, and had more precarious working conditions and lesser qualifications, coming to Spain seeking better economic opportunities. The economic growth of Brazil and the Spanish economic crisis that spanned the early 2010s triggered the emigration of some Brazilians back to Brazil.

In the 2020s, the economic growth of Spain has attracted many Brazilians to migrate to Spain. Though a bigger community exists in the neighboring country of Portugal, beginning in 2025 and continuing in 2026, some Brazilians begin to prefer Spain due to its more liberal migration approaches compared to Portugal. Portugal has strictened its migration policies since the election of a right-wing government in 2024, discouraging some Brazilians from moving to Portugal, one of the traditional destinations of Brazilian seeking to settle abroad.

According to the Spanish National Institute of Statistics, Brazilians are among the top 10 nationalities of origin of the migrants who settled in Spain during 2026, for the first time, with Brazilian emigration to Spain growing through 2026.

== Areas of settlement ==
Most Brazilians live in the Community of Madrid, Catalonia and Valencian Community. However, more than 20,000 live in Galicia as of 2025. Brazilians have a prominent place in Galicia's immigration demographics as Galician language is close to Portuguese, facilitating easier integration.
