= Ecuadorians in Spain =

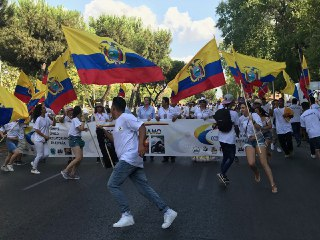
- Celebration of Ecuadorian Independence Day in Madrid

Total population
- 468,751 (2025) (Note: 468,751 is the size of the population in Spain born in Ecuador (including those with Spanish citizenship). 132,372 is the size of the foreign population (thus, with no Spanish citizenship) in Spain with Ecuadorian citizenship.)

Languages
- Spanish, Quechua

Religion
- Roman Catholicism

Related ethnic groups
- Peruvians in Spain; Colombians in Spain; Ecuadorian diaspora

Ecuadorians in Spain (Spanish: Ecuatorianos en España) have comprised a sizable community in Spain since the early 2000s. As of 2025, the number of immigrants from Ecuador residing in Spain, including those with Spanish citizenship, comprised 468,751.

Ecuadorians in Spain are the fifth largest diaspora community in Spain as of 2025, according to Spain's INE. The majority of Ecuadorians in Spain arrived during the early 2000s, during Ecuador's economic crisis and the consequent economic boom in Spain. Almost 500,000 Ecuadorians migrated to Spain from 1998 to 2008. In the 2010s, during the Spanish economic crisis, a very large amount of Ecuadorians in Spain became Spanish citizens through naturalisation, and some returned to Ecuador. After 2018, the Ecuadorian community in Spain grows again, though in a much slower pace compared to the early 2000s.

== History and overview ==
Historical population
Year	Pop.	±%
1998	3,972	—
1999	7,155	+80.1%
2000	20,481	+186.2%
2001	139,022	+578.8%
2002	242,522	+74.4%
2003	362,308	+49.4%
2004	453,484	+25.2%
2005	459,188	+1.3%
2006	457,154	−0.4%
2007	459,138	+0.4%
2008	477,113	+3.9%
2009	499,008	+4.6%
2010	496,665	−0.5%
2011	484,794	−2.4%
2012	471,264	−2.8%
2013	451,515	−4.2%
2014	427,876	−5.2%
2015	414,376	−3.2%
2016	406,904	−1.8%
2017	405,061	−0.5%
2018	405,125	+0.0%
2019	407,956	+0.7%
2020	414,354	+1.6%
2021	415,927	+0.4%
2022	419,024	+0.7%
2023	430,837	+2.8%
2024	448,643	+4.1%
2025	468,751	+4.5%
Source: National Statistics Institute (Spain)

=== Before 2000 ===
Until the late 1990s, only a few thousand Ecuadorians lived in Spain, as Ecuadorians then preferred to move to the United States. The first Ecuadorian communities in Spain began to emerge in the 1940s; the first migrants were from the city of Otavalo and surrounding areas. Close to the 1990s a small amount of people from Loja moved to Spain.

=== Rapid growth in the 2000s ===
Due to the economic crisis that affected the Ecuadorian society severely (and even led to the abandonment of the sucre in favor of the U.S. dollar) between 1998 and 2000, Ecuadorians began to move massively to Spain after 1998. The emergence of a large migratory wave to Spain from Ecuadorians was facilitated by the visa-free travel regime to the Schengen area that Ecuadorians enjoyed from 1963 to 2003, and the increased difficulty of emigrating to the US due to more strict policies. In the early 2000s, significantly more women moved to Spain than men. The main wave of Ecuadorian immigration in Spain took place between 1998 and 2005. Almost 500,000 Ecuadorians moved to Spain, and many more elsewhere in Europe (like Italy). During this period, almost 170,000 Ecuadorians moved to the Community of Madrid.

In the early 2000s, chain migration was observed to a degree. Many people emigrated to Spain supported from friends or relatives living in Spain. The majority of the newly arrived Ecuadorians often took low-paying jobs in their first years in the country. By 2002, many Ecuadorians began to regularise their immigration status in the country and receive papers. As Ecuadorians were able to travel to the Schengen Area (Spain is a member of it) visa-free, many Ecuadorians arrived in the country as tourists without intention to return. For example, in 2002, out of 101,432 Ecuadorians who arrived in the country as tourists, only 874 returned.

According to a survey that took place in 2014 and targeted the Ecuadorian community in Spain, the migrants surveyed named the economic crisis as the most important reason that triggered their emigration. Family reunification, the demand for jobs in Spain, the better salaries of Spain, the presence of acquaintances in Spain are among the other basic reasons.

The introduction of visa requirement for Ecuadorian citizens to enter the Schengen area (that includes Spain), effective from August 2003, effectively led the wave of Ecuadorian immigration to Spain to a halt. According to an article from Ecuadorian newspaper El Universo, the visa requirement announcement hastened the plans of some Ecuadorians to emigrate for Spain. Per the Spanish government, nearly 14,500 Ecuadorians traveled to Spain in the week 21-27 July 2003, while the average was close to 4,500 emigrants.

However, thousands of Ecuadorians continued to move to Spain until the 2008 Spanish crisis; many moved there in the premises of family unification. Many women found employment as domestic workers, while men were often employed in agriculture, construction or services.

The number of Ecuadorian born residents of Spain peaked at 500,512 in the late months of 2009.

=== Impact of the Spanish economic crisis and decline (2010s) ===
From 2010 to 2017, the Ecuadorian community declined by almost 100,000 people, as many migrants left the country, mostly for Ecuador and other European countries during Spain's economic crisis of 2008–2014. However, most of the Ecuadorian-born residents of Spain stayed in the country despite the crisis, and tens of thousands of Ecuadorians acquired Spanish citizenship during the 2010s. The number of Ecuadorians citizens in Spain without Spanish citizenship declined from 399,586 people in 2010 to 130,919 people in 2020, as a very large amount of Ecuadorian migrants obtained Spanish citizenship during this decade and others left either for Ecuador or migrated elsewhere. From 2013 to 2016, 101,186 Ecuadorian citizens living in Spain got naturalised and became Spanish citizens.

Despite the crisis, and problems such as high unemployment and evictions, most Ecuadorians stayed in Spain for various reasons: the fact they settled a new life in Spain, the progressive loss of social networks back in Ecuador, being used to Spanish life and culture, the fact that they had already children who were raised in Spain, the better salaries they could receive in Spain despite the crisis and the feeling that they would fail to accomplish their goals they set when they migrated, and because many wanted to see if conditions in Spain improve before they consider returning. Some returned as they lost the employment opportunities they had before the crisis, while many decided to return in Ecuador till the situation in Spain improves. In many cases, a part of the family stayed in Spain, and another one returned. However, few people used the voluntary return programs that were announced, due to entry restrictions to Spain they set.

During the early and mid 2010s, many Ecuadorian migrants in Spain lost their homes. Around to 10 to 15 thousand Ecuadorian families who acquired homes through mortgage in Spain were facing eviction in 2012, as they fell victims of predatory clauses in their mortgages. The Ecuadorian community began fighting back against evictions from 2008. According to the activist Aida Quinatoa, from the Bolivar province of Ecuador, banks and estate agents worked together to lure migrants into taking vast loans and often offer their home as collateral for other Ecuadorian families they didnt knew. Meanwhile, Banco Pichincha, an Ecuadorian bank with branches in Spain, bought the loans of Ecuadorians who where indebted in Spanish banks, causing controversy and anger within the Ecuadorian community as this meant that the migrants' debts would follow them in Ecuador if they returned. The Ecuadorian embassy and consulates in Spain offered free legal support to the families who were threatened with expulsion, and has worked towards collaborating with Spanish organisations who fight against evictions. The Ecuadorian People's Defender Office also sued Spain in the European Court of Human Rights in 2013, over the evictions laws that have affected thousands of families, while Ecuadorian activists in Spain organised associations, community groups and protests to fight against evictions.

By 2014, almost all Ecuadorians living in Spain for more than 5 years had regularised their migration status. Most of them living for more than 5 years had at least permanent residence in Spain, and by 2014 the 54,3% of the Ecuadorian community in Spain possessed Spanish nationality as well. 31% of the active population of the community was unemployed in 2014 due to the economic crisis in Spain. Only 24,4% owned the house they lived in, from 35,2% in 2009, before the crisis. Many lost the houses they lived in due to the inability to repay the mortgage or for other reasons.

=== Gradual growth (2020-today) ===
The community has begun to grow again after 2018 as the migration balance became positive again, due to the improvement of the economic conditions in Spain. Their number began to grow again slightly in the late 2010s, and more faster in the 2020s. According to National Institute of Statistics of Spain, the Ecuadorian community in Spain grew from 419,024 people in 2022 to 468,751 in 2025. The majority of the Ecuadorians in Spain has obtained the Spanish citizenship, and there is a continuing trend for Ecuadorian migrants in Spain, both among those who came more recently and those who came earlier, to get naturalised as Spaniards. In 2025, 13,689 Ecuadorians acquired Spanish citizenship.

However, in comparison with other Latin American countries, relatively few Ecuadorians are moving to Spain each year, due to the visa requirements to travel to Europe and the lack of a convenient pathways to move to the country. Hence, due to these two factors, the growth of the Ecuadorian community in Spain during the 2020s is considerably smaller than those from Colombia, Venezuela or Peru. A small amount of Ecuadorians, since 2022, work in Spain with temporary visas to assist in the collection of the agricultural harvest. As of 2026, the circular migration program, bound by treaties between Ecuador and Spain, where a predetermined number of Ecuadorians goes to Spain to work in certain professions for some months and then returns to Ecuador after that continues, as 1,001 people have participated in it between 2024 and 2026.

Ecuadorians in Spain constitute a considerable electoral body for both Spanish and Ecuadorian elections. In the 2025 elections in Ecuador, almost 190,000 Ecuadorians residing in Spain were registered in the electoral rolls. According to the Ecuadorian ambassador in Spain, Wilma Andrade, the Ecuadorian community in Spain is well integrated in the Spanish society and they run hundreds of Ecuadorian restaurants in the country, among many other establishments. As of March 2026, out of the 468,751 Ecuadorian-born residents of Spain, 340,471 of them possess Spanish citizenship, and hence Ecuador is the most common country of birth among the more than 2,6 million naturalised Spanish citizens. The political opinions of the naturalised Spanish citizens of Ecuadorian origin lean to the left, as according to polls conducted by the Center for Sociological Research (CIS) regarding the voting intention of naturalised migrants that took place between May 2024 and January 2026, 47% of the naturalised Ecuadorians surveyed responded they intend to vote for PSOE in the next election, and 6% for Sumar-Podemos.

=== Other demographic trends ===
Thousands of children have been born in Spain to Ecuadorian-born mothers. In 2010, 9,312 babies in Spain were born to Ecuadorian-born mothers, and in 2024, 4,542. The decline of the birthrate among the Ecuadorian community in Spain is attributed to the economic crisis, which triggered a significant decline in the national fertility rate, the slowed growth of the Ecuadorian community in Spain, and the increasing median age of the community as most Ecuadorians in Spain settled there before 2010.

== Geographical distribution ==
Distribution of Ecuadorians of Spain by autonomous community
Autonomous community	2025	2021
Community of Madrid	140,764	128,125
Catalonia	96,802	85,396
Valencian Community	51,608	44,496
Region of Murcia	42,446	38,202
Andalucia	27,051	24,253
Balearic Islands	18,012	15,966
Castilla-La Mancha	16,700	13,534
Navarre	16,654	14,756
Aragon	14,668	12,920
Castile and León	10,700	8,965
Basque Country	10,227	8,942
Canary Islands	7,498	6,702
Asturias	5,228	4,789
La Rioja (Spain)	3,427	3,006
Galicia	2,849	2,282
Cantabria	2,606	2,300
Extremadura	1,369	1,186
Ceuta	57	48
Melilla	55	62
Total Spain	468,751	415,927

== See also ==
- Ecuador–Spain relations
- Immigration to Spain
- 1998–99 Ecuador banking crisis
