= Latin American migration to Spain =

Latin American diaspora in Spain

As of January 2025, there are 4,685,665 Latin American-born people living in Spain. Flows of migration have been dependent on the economic conditions in their countries of birth and in Spain. With nearly one million individuals, Colombians in Spain constitute the largest group of Latin Americans in the country.

Due to the Latin American immigration to Spain, Spain is by far the European country with the most residents born in the Americas. The Latin American community emerged during the economic boom in the 2000s, although a second migratory wave began from 2018. The factors who have facilitated the high number of Latin Americans in Spain include the lack of visa requirements to travel to Spain for the most Latin American countries (except Cuba, Dominican Republic, Ecuador and Bolivia), the shared language and the accelerated path to naturalisation.

== History ==
In the 20th century, Spain was a country of net emigration, particularly to Latin America and northern Europe. In the 1970s, small numbers of immigrants arrived in Spain, including Latin Americans fleeing dictatorships, but the country did not have a significant number of immigrants until the late 1990s.

Many Latin Americans immigrated to Spain during the country's economic boom in the late 1990s and beginning of the 2000s. Various events that happened across Latin America during this period pushed Latin Americans to immigrate. These include: the 1998–1999 Ecuador economic crisis, the 1998–2002 Argentine great depression, the 2002 Uruguayan economic crisis, the Colombian economic crisis in the late nineties, the economic problems in Bolivia and other political, economic and social developments across Latin America during the same period.

In the early 2010s, the 2008-2014 Spanish economic crisis and the spike in unemployment among native Spaniards and migrants alike resulted in a rather small, yet visible, wave of return of Latin Americans back to their countries. Yet, for various personal, economic and social reasons, a large majority of the migrants decided to remain in Spain despite the crisis. In the late 2010s, as the Spanish economic crisis ended and the Spanish economy grew again, a new wave of Latin American migration appeared, with Colombians and Venezuelans leading the renewed growth of the Latin American community in Spain after 2017-18.

Venezuelan migration to Spain surged as a result of the country's ongoing crisis; as of 2021, Venezuelans constituted the single largest nationality applying for asylum in the country. Migration decreased in 2020 due to reduced long-distance flights during the COVID-19 pandemic.

While ten years is the usual minimum for a foreigner to acquire Spanish nationality by residency, Latin Americans – including Brazilians – can achieve it in two years.

== Politics ==
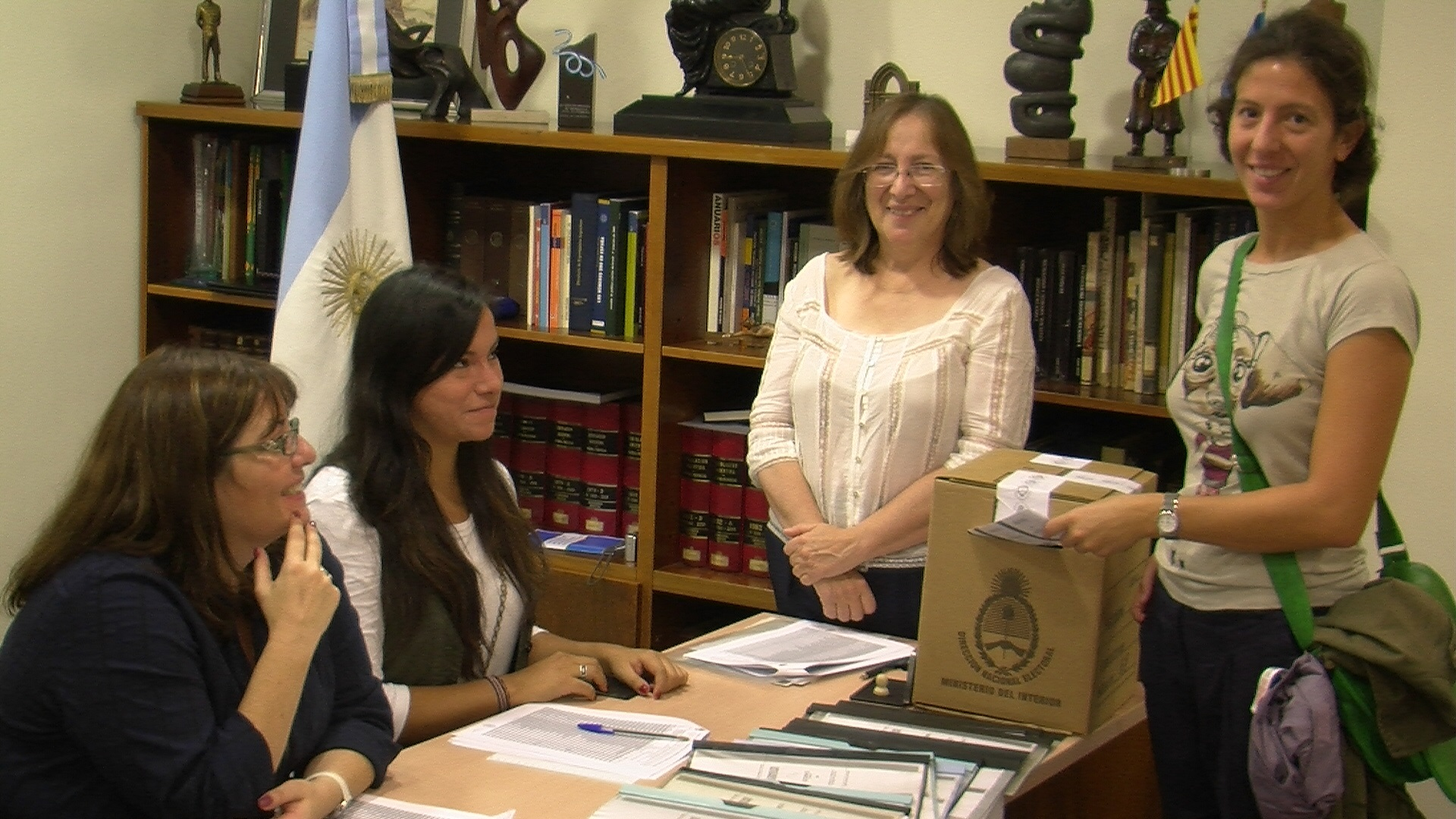
Overseas voting for the 2011 Argentine general election, at the consulate in Barcelona

According to Deutsche Welle, 2.5 million of 37 million registered voters in the 2023 Spanish general election were of Latin American origin, including 1.6 million resident in Spain. In that election, the parties on the right, the People's Party (PP) and Vox, created initiatives for Latin American voters, referring to family values and religion. Vox courted Evangelical Christians and anti-communists from countries such as Venezuela, Cuba, Bolivia and Brazil. On the left, the government parties of the Spanish Socialist Workers' Party (PSOE) and Sumar preferred outreach that was not specific to Latin Americans, including measures to regularise migrants and include them in the workforce.

An analysis by ABC in 2026 found that in Spain, the majority of Cubans and Venezuelans voted for parties of the right, and the majority of Argentines, Peruvians, Ecuadorians and Dominicans for parties of the left, as well as a plurality of Colombians.

== Economy ==
The National Statistics Institute (INE) recorded in 2022 that Latin American countries included four of the five nationalities in Spain with the highest percentages of higher education; Venezuelan was the only nationality in which the majority of adults had higher education. According to the Unión General de Trabajadores, many immigrants have to accept work below their level of education due to bureaucratic delays in the recognition of foreign degrees. Roughly the half of the Venezuelans and Cubans in Spain possess a university degree or a higher professional training qualification, but less than 20% of the Hondurans and Ecuadorians possess the same.

The employment rate of Latin Americans in Spain is 77% in the ages 25-59 as of the last quarter of 2024. It is slightly lower than that of the native Spaniards but higher than that of the Asians and Africans. However, while the employment rate for Hondurans is 86%, on Brazilians it is only 68%. The most common sectors of employment for Latin Americans are hospitality, retail, construction, manufacturing, administrative services, domestic work and healthcare/social services. Less Latin Americans, compared to Spaniards, work on the public sector or have a high skilled job.

By July 2026, 1.2 million Latin American nationals were enrolled in Social security in Spain. For the first time since records began in 2012, this figure was higher than that of foreign European Union nationals. From 2019 to 2026, Latin Americans were 692,000 of the new 3 million jobs.

== Demographics ==
Colombian migrants in Spain are the largest group of Latin Americans in the country. As of 2024, more than a million residents in Madrid were born in Latin America. Migrants from Brazil – the sole Portuguese-speaking country in Latin America – are particularly notable in Galicia, where the native language is close to their own.

Due to ancestral ties and economic links, some areas in Spain are particularly popular with the migrants from specific Latin American countries. For example, Hondurans are particularly notable in Girona, where they are the largest foreign nationality in the city. In 2024, Nicaraguans were the third-largest immigrant community in the Basque Country; more than 70% were female, around three quarters were aged 15-44, and slightly more than half had an irregular migration status. The Nicaraguans in the region are largely employed in care for the elderly. In Tenerife, 5% of the population are Venezuelans, as strong family links between the Canaries and Venezuela have made the Canary Islands a popular migration destination for Venezuelan migrants in Spain. For similar reasons, out of the more than 250,000 Cubans who live in Spain, almost 70,000 live in the Canary Islands.

=== Religion ===
Latin Americans are the basic force behind the growth of the Protestant churches in Spain after 2000. The share of Protestants in Spain increased from 0,2% in 1998 to 2% in 2018, mostly thanks to Latin American immigration.

In many Protestant parishes, the younger members are mostly migrants from Latin American countries.

=== By country of birth ===
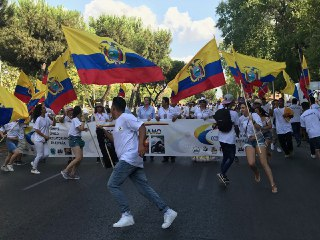
Ecuadorian independence day celebrations in Madrid

Per National Statistics Institute, 1 January 2025: For comparison, the numbers for 2020, 2015 and 2010, 2005 and 2000 are shown. All figures are per the National Statistics Institute.

Latin Americans in Spain by country
Country	2025	2020	2015	2010	2005	2000
Colombia	978,041	490,877	344,843	376,161	273,496	35,668
Venezuela	692,316	380,863	161,180	148,149	107,372	54,719
Ecuador	468,751	414,354	414,376	496,665	459,188	21,734
Argentina	450,983	289,783	249,441	282,553	235,957	70,491
Peru	430,277	236,247	183,233	197,828	105,735	37,453
Cuba	252,290	162,063	127,868	103,186	71,232	40,637
Honduras	220,593	123,808	42,443	26,901	7,757	2,235
Dominican Republic	207,135	182,114	155,839	136,974	74,933	32,206
Bolivia	193,275	173,464	156,711	216,019	96,461	3,723
Brazil	189,712	147,621	101,982	132,651	64,997	25,037
Paraguay	162,633	100,240	65,429	80,084	16,798	1,550
Nicaragua	93,905	59,747	21,678	12,892	3,115	1,789
Uruguay	91,437	81,052	73,287	84,806	65,111	17,699
Mexico	87,575	59,651	46,778	44,803	33,596	16,602
Chile	82,165	60,391	53,269	64,296	42,044	20,086
El Salvador	40,811	26,171	10,678	8,325	4,650	2,050
Guatemala	21,248	14,130	8,103	6,888	3,895	1,757
Panama	9,028	6,154	4,437	4,539	3,321	1,942
Costa Rica	8,350	5,603	3,568	3,248	2,254	1,110
Total Spain	4,685,665	3,013,833	2,225,143	2,426,968	1,671,912	388,752

=== By country of nationality ===
Per National Statistics Institute, 1 January 2025. In the table below, migrants are only included if they have only the citizenship of their countries of birth, and are not Spanish citizens. The large decline of the residents of Spain with Latin American nationality during the 2010s arose because hundreds of thousands of Latin Americans obtained Spanish citizenship and ceased to be recorded as foreign citizens in the Spanish databases.

Some Latin Americans, especially Argentines and Uruguayans, have arrived with Italian or Portuguese passports, thus the Spanish government counts them as Italians or Portuguese citizens. Those migrants who arrive already having Spanish citizenship, usually by being the descendants of Spanish migrants in Latin America, are regarded as Spanish citizens.

For comparison, the numbers for 2020, 2015 and 2010, 2005 and 2000 are shown. All figures are per the National Statistics Institute.

Country	2025	2020	2015	2010	2005	2000
Colombia	676,534	273,050	151,258	292,641	271,239	25,247
Venezuela	377,809	189,110	48,421	60,399	49,206	12,119
Peru	260,544	106,712	71,112	140,182	85,029	27,422
Honduras	177,929	121,963	43,283	27,363	7,017	1,293
Argentina	148,585	89,029	75,313	132,249	152,975	23,351
Ecuador	132,372	130,919	176,397	399,586	497,799	20,481
Paraguay	122,635	87,045	69,451	85,687	16,295	711
Brazil	105,990	98,655	73,863	117,808	54,115	11,126
Cuba	88,367	64,634	46,397	54,954	45,009	17,814
Nicaragua	72,492	57,530	20,941	12,190	1,953	700
Bolivia	67,242	92,630	126,375	213,169	97,947	2,117
Dominican Republic	64,212	75,261	75,315	91,212	57,134	24,847
Mexico	39,650	28,822	21,657	25,449	22,922	5,510
Chile	37,454	28,153	26,793	44,570	35,800	8,203
El Salvador	31,800	21,578	7,277	6,025	3,015	1,024
Uruguay	28,770	28,160	27,457	46,865	42,433	5,092
Guatemala	12,750	7,136	3,485	4,068	1,895	574
Costa Rica	4,954	3,417	1,874	1,925	1,232	411
Panama	4,405	2,996	1,860	2,331	1,467	522
Total Spain	2,454,464	1,506,800	1,068,529	1,758,583	1,444,482	188,564

=== Number of children born in Spain by Latin American mothers ===
In 2025, roughly the 17% of children born in Spain during this year were from Latin American mothers. Latin American women, due to the higher fertility rates in their home countries, tend to have slightly higher birthrates compared to the Spaniard women in general, though the fertility rate of Latin Americans in Spain often is lower than their countries of origin and tends to gradually converge with that of Spaniard women.

Hundreds of thousands of Spanish residents and citizens are having Latin American parents, with the majority of them feeling fully integrated to the Spanish while celebrating their Latin American roots.

The fertility rate of Latin Americans in Spain varies by country of origin. In general, Bolivians and Brazilians have higher fertility rate compared to Venezuelans or Colombians. In the 2020s, the arrival of many Latin American migrants in Spain has heavily increased the number of children born per year to members of the Latin American community in Spain.

Below is shown a table showing the number of births by Latin American country of origin of the mother. For historical comparison, statistics from 2025, 2021, 2018, 2015, 2012, 2009 are shown. As INE doesnt releases statistics for the births of mothers by every American country in Spain, some countries are included in the "Rest of Americas" category. These people are mostly from Honduras, Dominican Republic, Nicaragua, Mexico and Paraguay.

Births in Spain by Latin American mothers by country of origin of the mother
Country	2025	2021	2018	2015	2012	2009
Colombia	12,976	6,068	4,811	4,532	5,355	6,258
Rest of Americas	12,927	10,705	9,683	7,925	7,598	7,272
Venezuela	7,774	4,543	3,485	2,150	2,244	2,250
Peru	5,809	2,964	2,729	2,624	3,086	3,400
Ecuador	4,532	4,704	5,523	6,228	7,721	9,986
Argentina	3,610	2,574	2,360	2,777	3,399	3,947
Brazil	2,735	2,190	2,293	1,884	2,218	3,012
Cuba	2,179	1,424	1,185	1,121	1,146	1,274
Bolivia	1,887	2,381	3,111	3,534	3,906	5,156
Uruguay	570	570	599	699	811	1,055
Chile	519	454	487	534	706	863
Total Spain	55,518	38,577	36,258	34,008	38,193	44,406

== See also ==
- Colombians in Spain
- Dominicans in Spain
- Ecuadorians in Spain
- Mexicans in Spain
- Paraguayans in Spain
- Peruvians in Spain
- Uruguayans in Spain
- Venezuelans in Spain
