= Venezuelans in Spain =

Venezuelans in Spain Venezolanos en España
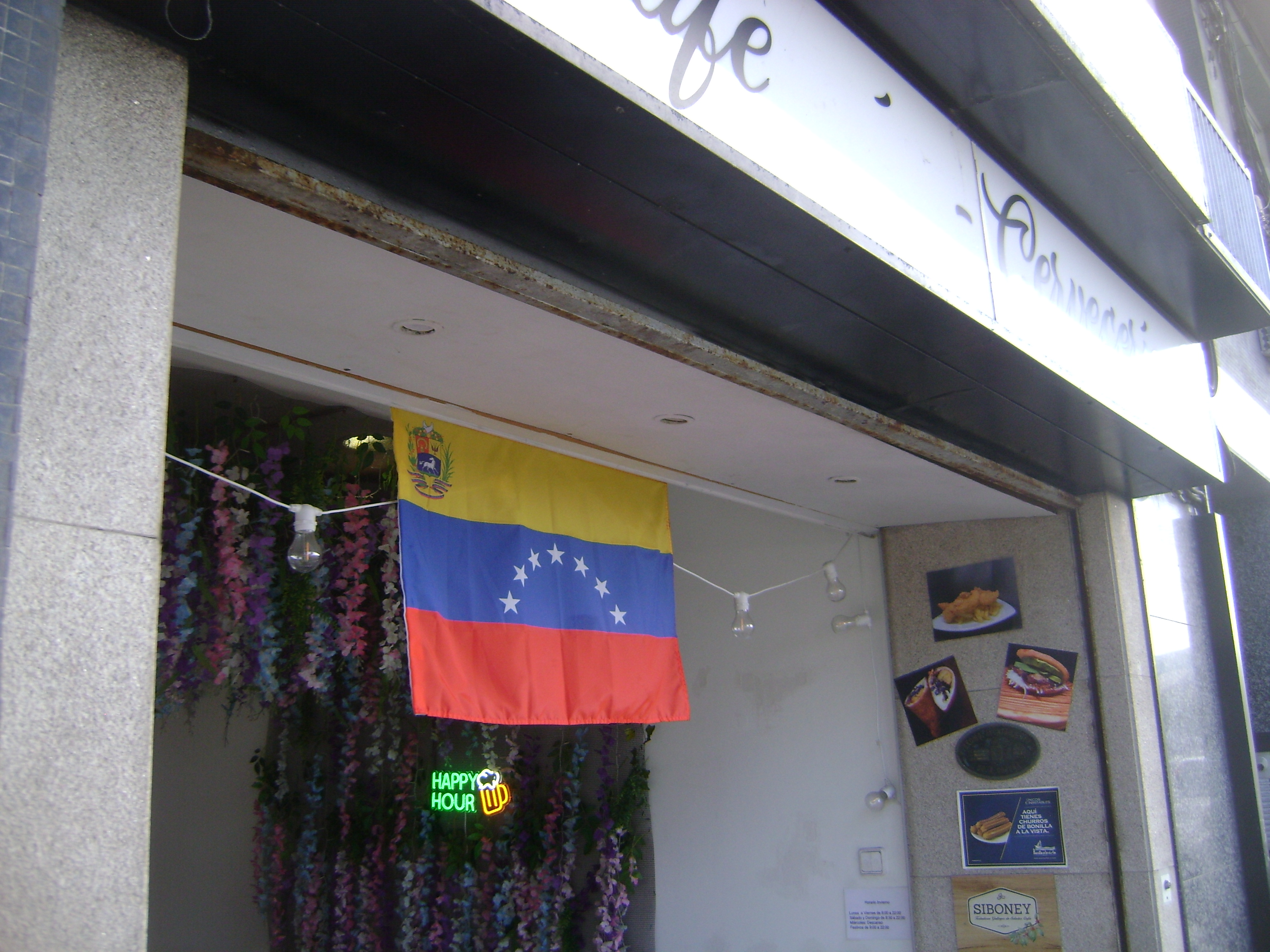
- Venezuelan restaurant in Spain

Total population
- 692,316 (2025) / 377,809 (2025) (Note: 413,662 is the size of the population in Spain born in Venezuela (including those with Spanish citizenship). 197,615 is the size of the foreign population (thus, with no Spanish citizenship) in Spain with Venezuelan citizenship.)

Regions with significant populations
- Canary Islands, Valencia, Barcelona, Madrid, L'Alfàs del Pi, Marbella, Benidorm

Languages
- Spanish

Religion
- Catholicism

Venezuelans in Spain (Spanish: Venezolanos in España) are the third largest immigrant group in Spain. Among the Venezuelan who leave their country, Spain is by far the most common destination for those who settle in Europe, due to the similarity of culture, shared language, and ancestry among other reasons,

Venezuelan immigration to Spain increased as a result of the country's ongoing political crisis. As of January 2025, there were 692,316 Venezuelan-born people living in Spain. Out of these, 377,809 possessed only Venezuelan citizenship.

Community of Madrid and Canary Islands are the main areas of settlement for the Venezuelans in Spain. As many Galicians migrated to Venezuela in the past, many Venezuelans move to Galicia.

== History ==
Historical population
Year	Pop.	±%
2000	54,719	—
2001	62,335	+13.9%
2002	68,924	+10.6%
2003	78,987	+14.6%
2004	95,356	+20.7%
2005	107,372	+12.6%
2006	117,749	+9.7%
2007	126,861	+7.7%
2008	138,216	+9.0%
2009	145,564	+5.3%
2010	148,149	+1.8%
2011	151,935	+2.6%
2012	155,846	+2.6%
2013	156,092	+0.2%
2014	154,567	−1.0%
2015	161,180	+4.3%
2016	174,320	+8.2%
2017	199,035	+14.2%
2018	243,837	+22.5%
2019	309,510	+26.9%
2020	380,863	+23.1%
2021	411,996	+8.2%
2022	440,953	+7.0%
2023	518,918	+17.7%
2024	599,769	+15.6%
2025	692,316	+15.4%
Source: National Statistics Institute (Spain)

As a former part of the Spanish Empire in the Americas and a major destination of Spanish emigration up until the second half of the 20th century, Venezuela shares strong historical ties with Spain.

After Hugo Chávez came to power following the 1998 Venezuelan presidential election many upper-class Venezuelans decided to leave the country, a movement that intensified with the failure of the 2002 coup against President Chávez. After 2015, the Venezuelan community has seen explosive growth, growing from around 150,000 people to almost 700,000 people in only ten years, because of the political and economic crisis that has seriously affected Venezuela after 2014. Venezuelans in Spain are working mostly in the service sector. Venezuelans in Spain have also established businesses that produce Venezuelan food and products in Spain.

In 2021, Venezuela constituted the third-largest source of migration to Spain after Morocco and Colombia. Some estimated 100,000 Venezuelans settled in Madrid, assimilating well into Spanish society due to common Hispanic ethnicity and family ties. However, a few Venezuelans also settled in villages.

As many Venezuelans settle permanently in Spain, they are gradually obtaining Spanish citizenship through naturalization. In 2025 36,271 Venezuelan-born residents of Spain obtained Spanish citizenship, while since 2023 almost 100,000 Venezuelans in Spain have become Spanish citizens. The large size of the Venezuelan community in Spain is another factor who contributes in the high amount of naturalization of Venezuelan residents every year.

In general, many leading members of the Venezuelan opposition, including Edmundo González, who was the opposition candidate in the 2024 Venezuelan presidential election, have moved to Spain after the 2010s economic and political crisis.

== Legal status ==
Similarly to nationals from other countries of Ibero-America, Venezuelans of origin are allowed to apply for dual Spanish citizenship after two years of legal residence in Spain. In addition, Venezuelans who are children or grandchildren of Spanish citizens can legally obtain Spanish citizenship from their countries of origin, an option open to over three million Venezuelans.

== See also ==
- Immigration to Spain
- Spain–Venezuela relations
- Spaniards in Venezuela
- Venezuelan people
