= Ecuador–Spain relations =

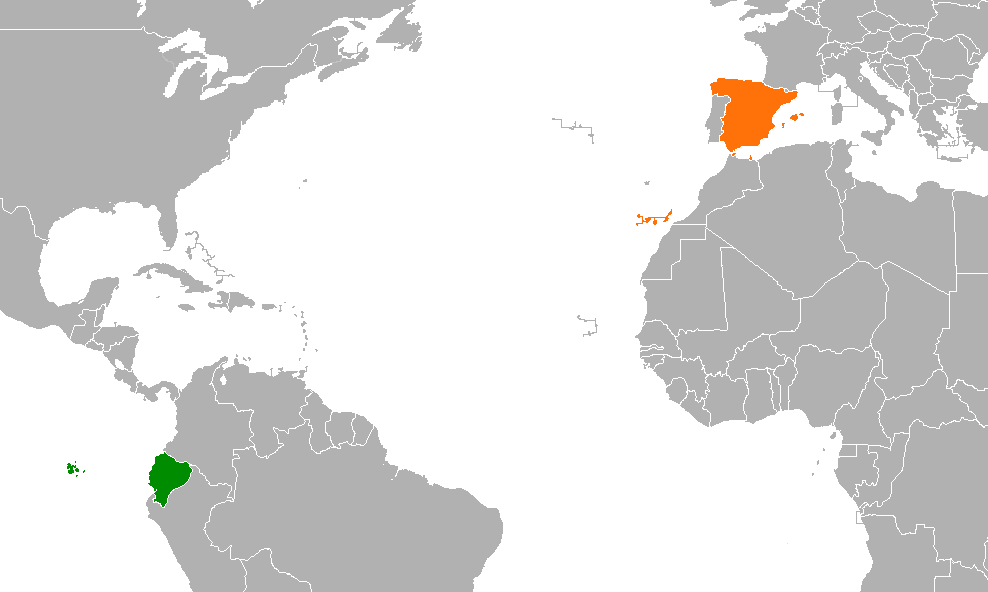
- Ecuador: Spain

Diplomatic mission
- Embassy of Ecuador, Madrid: Embassy of Spain, Quito

Ecuador and Spain have maintained historical and current relations. Both nations are members of the Association of Academies of the Spanish Language and the Organization of Ibero-American States.

== History ==
=== Spanish colonization ===
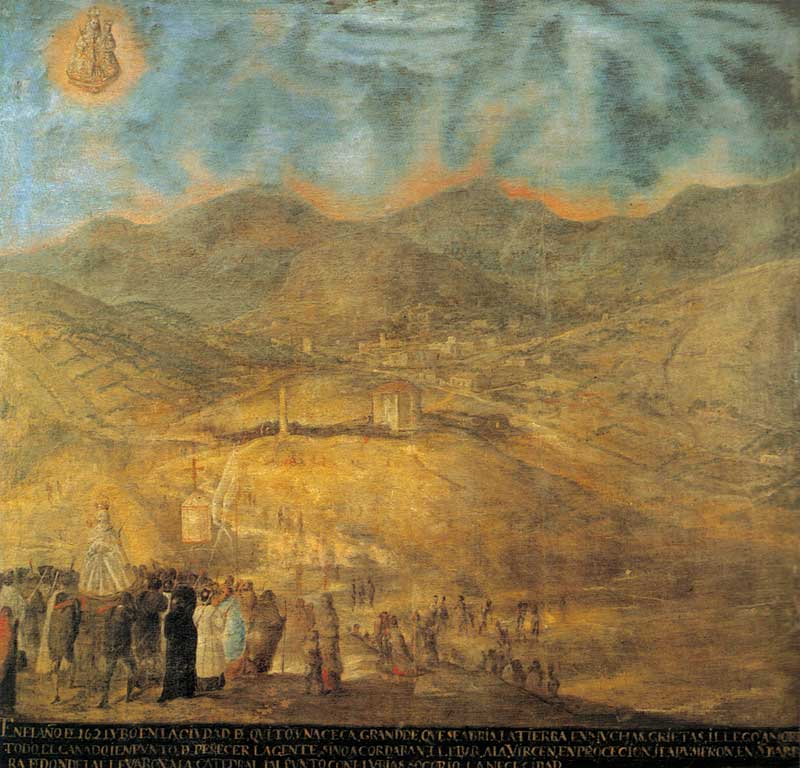
San Francisco de Quito, 1757

Ecuador and Spain share a long history since the arrival of the first Spanish conquistadores led by Francisco Pizarro in 1532. By 1534, Pizarro managed to overcome the Incan Empire (which extended from present day Ecuador, Bolivia, Peru and Chile) and claimed the territory for Spain. In 1534, Spanish troops battled against General Rumiñahui and his army during the Battle of Mount Chimborazo in central Ecuador after Rumiñahui discovered the Spanish treachery and the murder of his half-brother Emperor Atahualpa. Rumiñahui burned down the secondary Inca capital (near present-day Quito) and hid the Treasure of the Llanganatis before the battle.

In 1534, Spanish conquistadores, Sebastián de Belalcázar and Diego de Almagro founded the city of San Francisco de Quito in honor of Francisco Pizarro which was built on top of the ruins of the secondary Inca capital. In 1542, the Viceroyalty of Peru was created and the territory of Ecuador was governed from its capital in Lima and administered through the Real Audiencia of Quito. In 1717, the Viceroyalty of New Granada was created with its capital in Bogotá and Ecuador was governed under the new viceroyalty.

=== Independence ===
On 10 August 1809, Ecuador was the first country in Spanish America to declare independence soon after Napoleon’s invasion of Spain in 1808. The independence movement became known as the Luz de América. Immediately, the criollo rebels of Ecuador lacked the anticipated support for their cause and they returned power back to the crown authorities who became brutal and punished the rebels severely.

In 1822, armies led by Simón Bolívar and Antonio José de Sucre arrived to Ecuador and fought Spanish troops at the Battle of Pichincha near Quito which secured Ecuador's independence. Ecuador soon became part of the Gran Colombia along with Colombia, Venezuela and Panama. Ecuador became an independent nation in May 1830.

=== Post independence ===
In 1840, Ecuador and Spain established diplomatic relations with the signing of a Treaty of Peace and Friendship between both nations. In 1866, Ecuador declared war against Spain during the Chincha Islands War which also involved Bolivia, Chile and Peru.

In 1936, Ecuadorian writer Demetrio Aguilera Malta (member of the Guayaquil Group) was in Spain when the Spanish Civil War broke out. Aguilera wrote about his experience during the war in his book titled Madrid: reportaje novelado de una retaguardia heroica. In May 1980, Spanish King Juan Carlos I paid an official visit to Ecuador, his first and only visit to the country.

== High-level visits ==
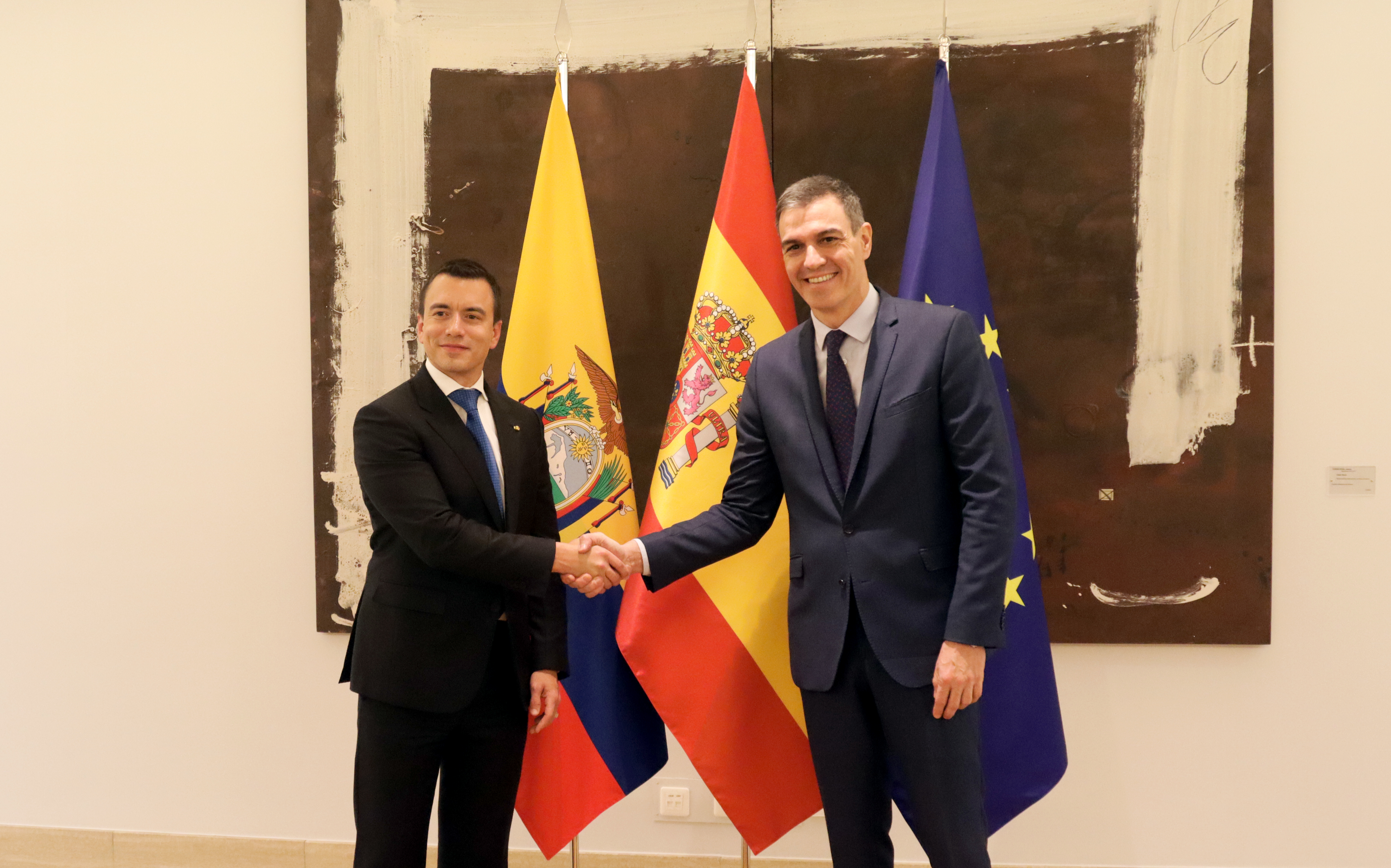
Ecuadorian President Daniel Noboa and Spanish Prime Minister Pedro Sánchez in Madrid; January 2024.

Presidential visits from Ecuador to Spain

- President Rodrigo Borja Cevallos (1989, 1992)
- President Gustavo Noboa (2001, 2002)
- President Rafael Correa (2007, 2012, 2014, 2017)
- President Lenín Moreno (2017, 2018, 2019)
- President Guillermo Lasso (2021, 2023)
- President Daniel Noboa (2024, 2025)

Royal and Prime Ministerial visits from Spain to Ecuador

- Prime Minister Adolfo Suárez (1979)
- King Juan Carlos I (1980)
- Prime Minister Leopoldo Calvo-Sotelo (1982)
- Prime Minister Felipe González (1986)
- Prime Minister José María Aznar (1999)
- Crowned Prince Felipe (2012, 2013)
- King Felipe VI (2021, 2024)
- Prime Minister Pedro Sánchez (2022)

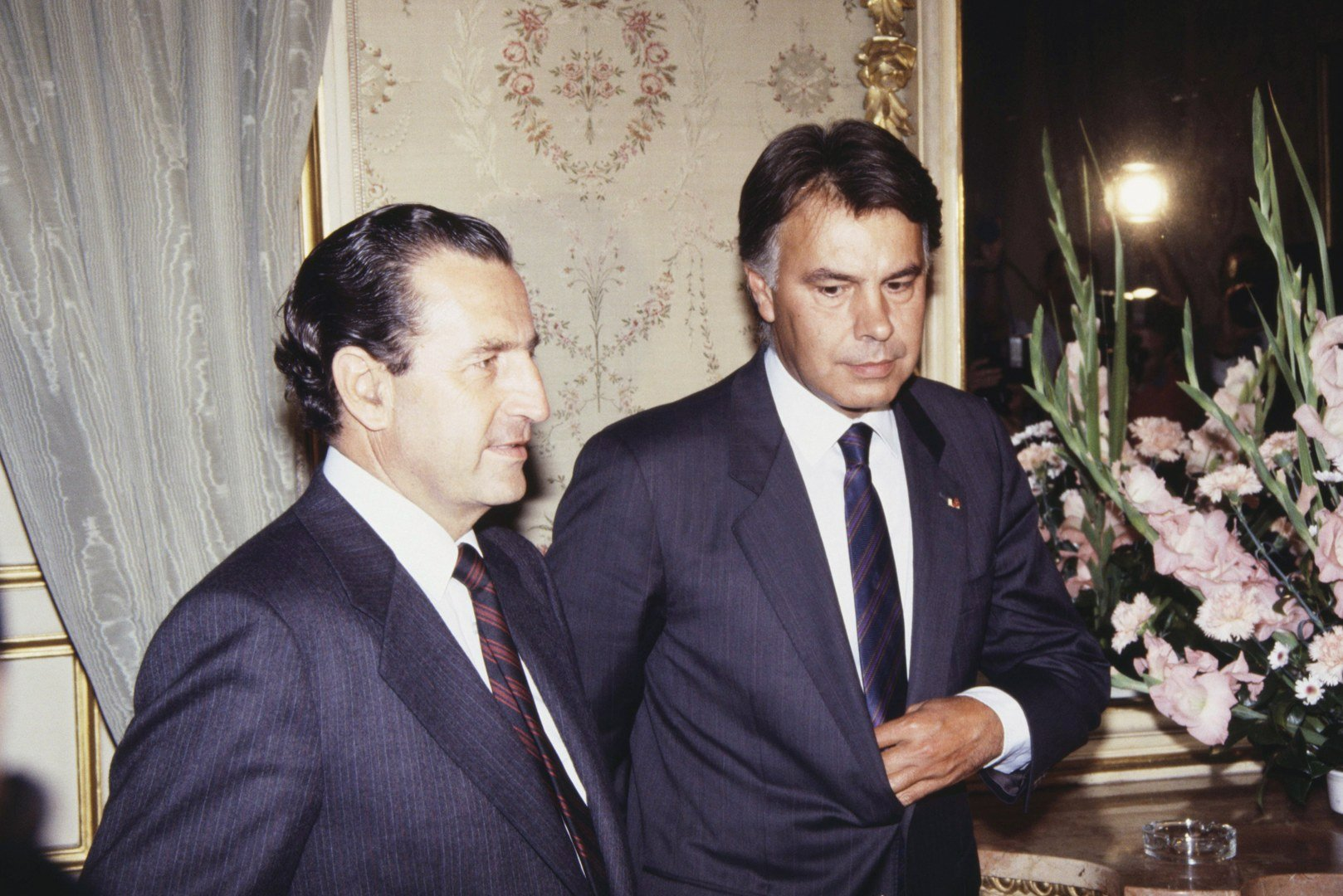
Prime Minister Felipe González and President Rodrigo Borja Cevallos in Madrid; September 1989.

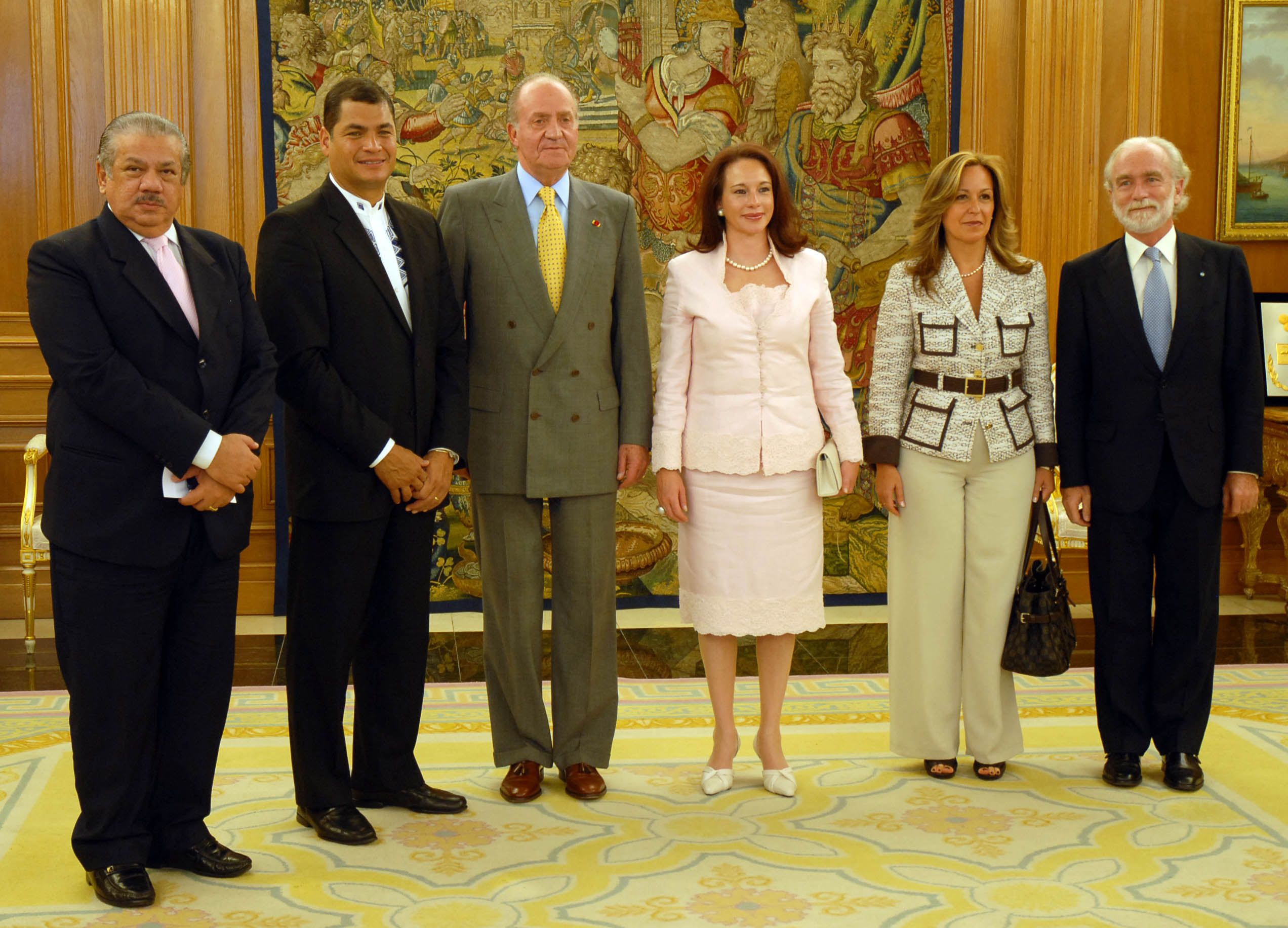
President Rafael Correa and King Juan Carlos I in Madrid; July 2007.

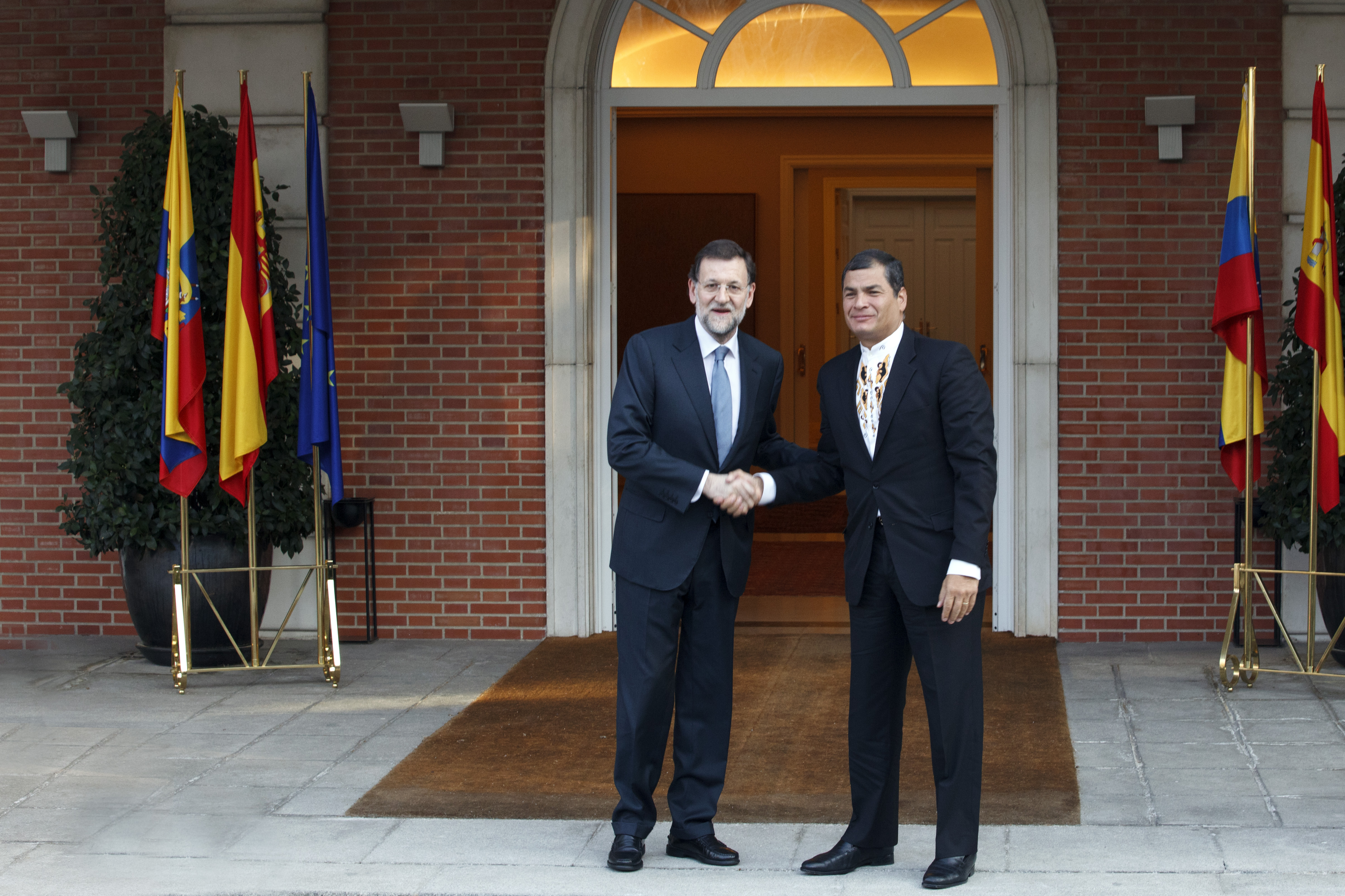
Prime Minister Mariano Rajoy and President Rafael Correa in Madrid; March 2012.

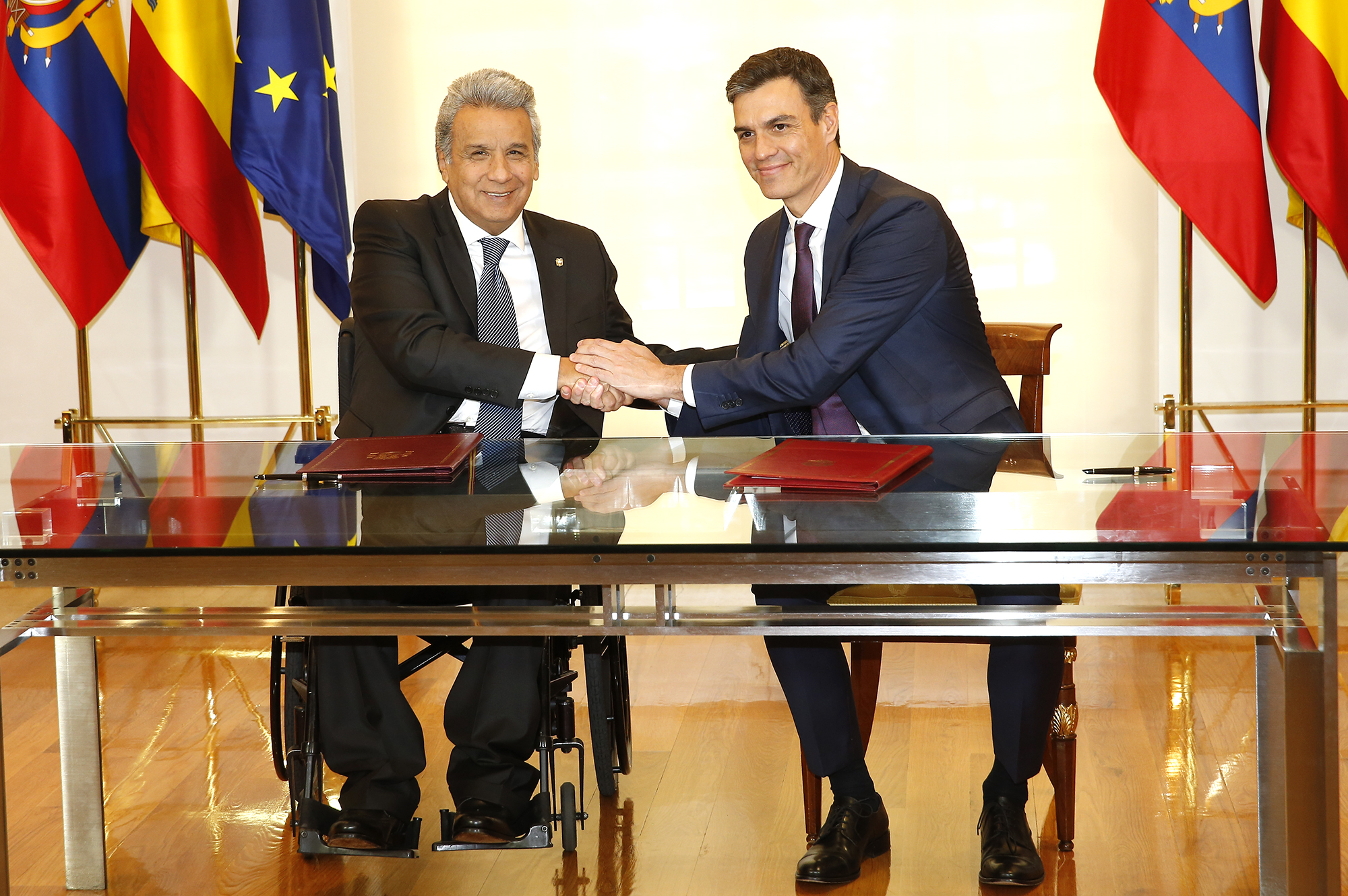
President Lenín Moreno and Prime Minister Pedro Sánchez in Madrid; July 2018.

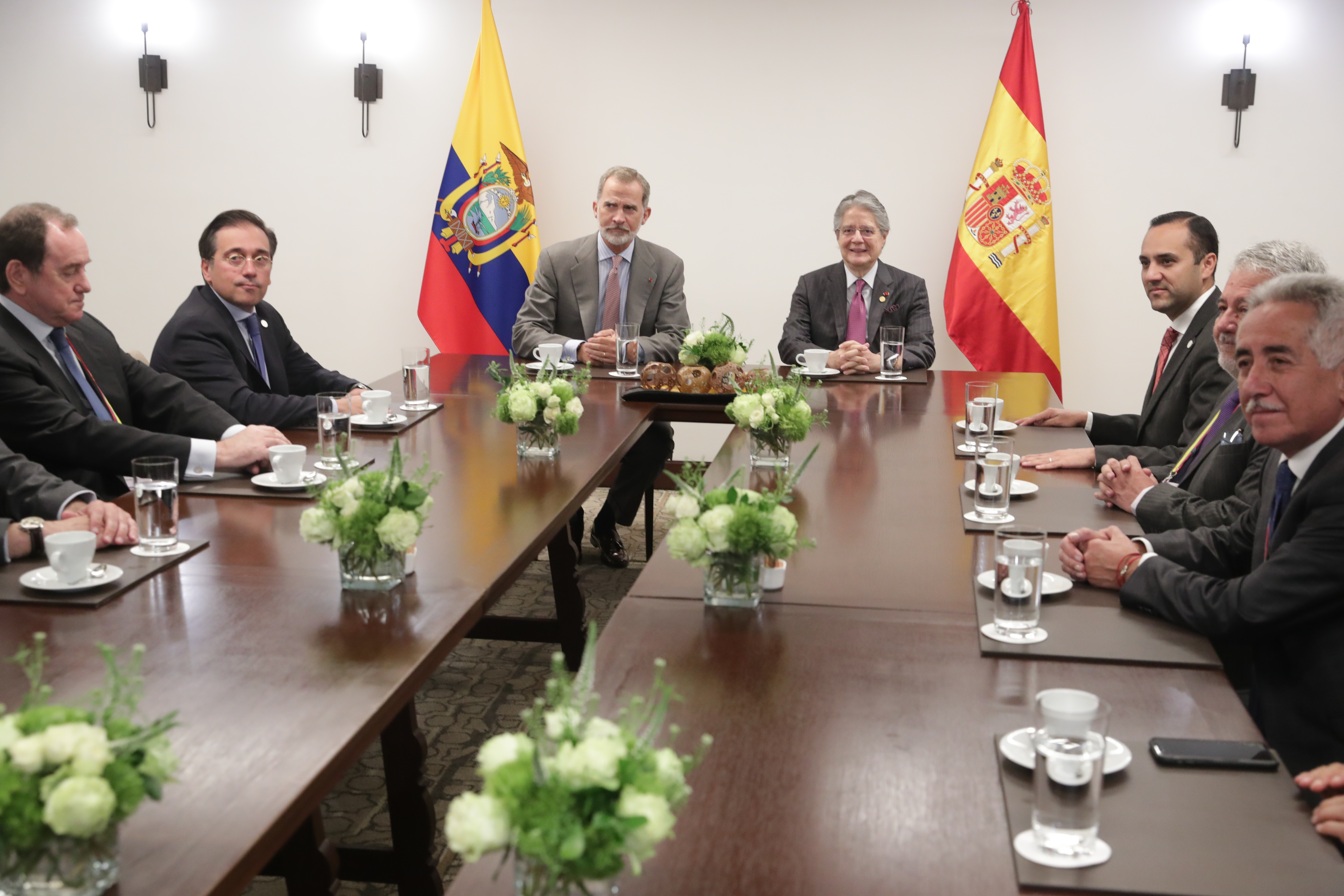
King Felipe VI and President Guillermo Lasso in Bogotá, Colombia; August 2022.

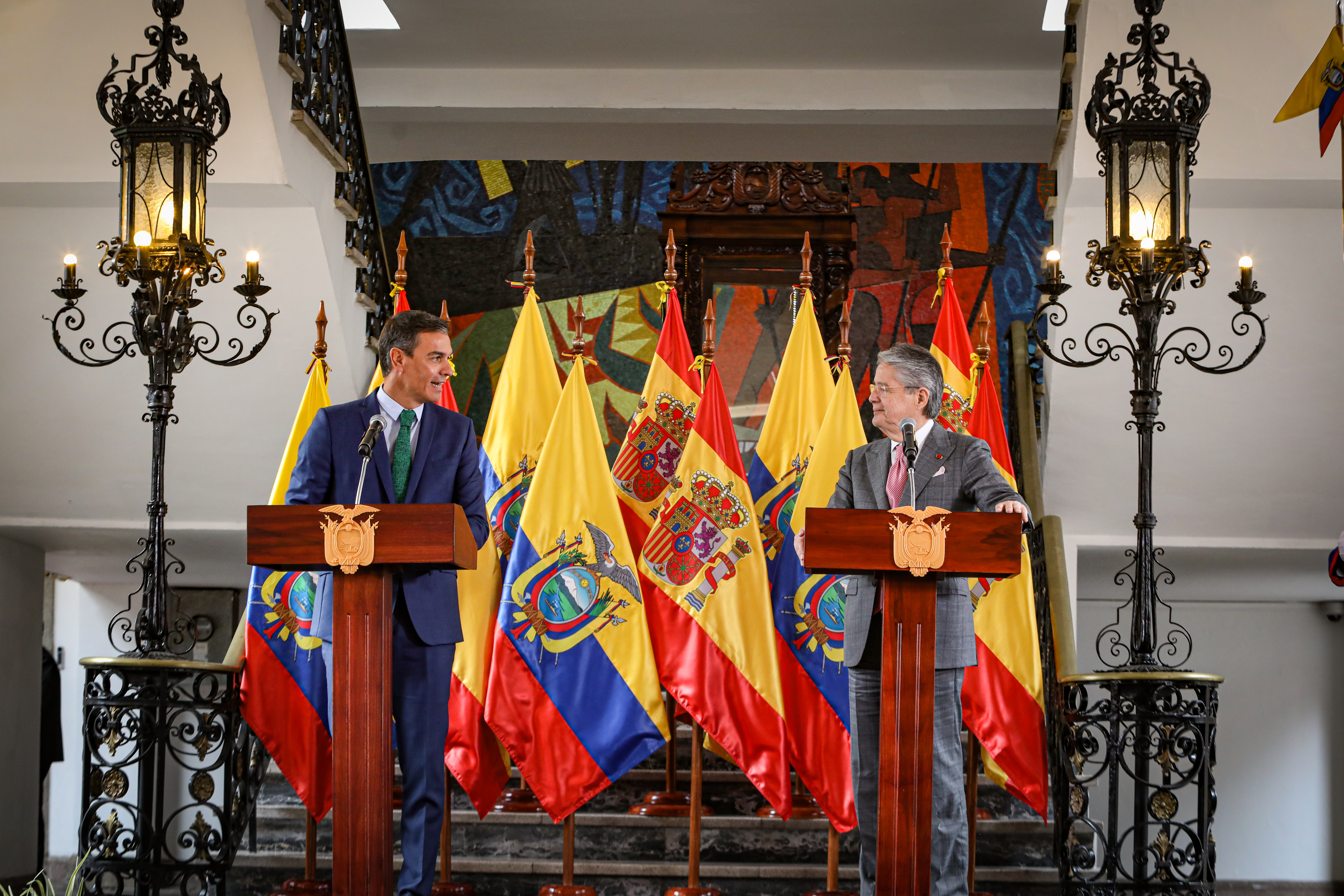
President Guillermo Lasso and Prime Minister Pedro Sánchez in Quito; August 2022.

== Bilateral relations ==
Over the years, several agreements and treaties have been signed by both nations such as an Agreement on Dual-Citizenship (1964); Agreement on Technical Cooperation (1971); Tourism Agreement (1971); Air Transportation Agreement (1974); Agreement on Cultural Cooperation (1974); Agreement on Atomic Energy Cooperation for Peaceful Purposes (1977); Extradition Treaty (1989); Agreement on the avoidance of Double-Taxation (1991); Agreement on Migration (2001); Agreement on the Recognition of Driver's License's issued by both nations (2003) and an Agreement on the participation of citizens who legally reside in either Ecuador or Spain to participate in local elections (2009).

== Migration ==
In 2013, there were 456,000 Ecuadorian citizens living in Spain. Many of the Ecuadorians in Spain arrived in the 1990s during the Ecuador financial crisis which led to the country adopting the U.S. dollar. In 2013, 21,000 Spanish citizens resided in Ecuador. Between 2008 and 2015, 35,000 Spanish citizens arrived to Ecuador of which 36% were born in Spain and 62% were Spanish citizens of Ecuadorian origin.

== Transportation ==
There are direct flights between both nations with Air Europa and Iberia.

== Trade ==
In 2024, trade between Ecuador and Spain totaled €1.4 billion Euros. Ecuador's main exports to Spain include: canned tuna, shrimp, flowers, frozen fish and bananas. Spain's main exports to Ecuador include: capital goods and industrial inputs; frozen fish and consumer goods. In 2016, Spanish investments in Ecuador totaled US$626 million. Spanish multinational companies such as Repsol, Mapfre and Telefónica operate in Ecuador.

== Resident diplomatic missions ==
of Ecuador in Spain

- Madrid (Embassy)
- Madrid (Consulate-General)
- Barcelona (Consulate-General)
- Málaga (Consulate)
- Murcia (Consulate)
- Palma de Mallorca (Consulate)
- Valencia (Consulate)

of Spain in Ecuador

- Quito (Embassy)
- Quito (Consulate-General)
- Guayaquil (Consulate-General)

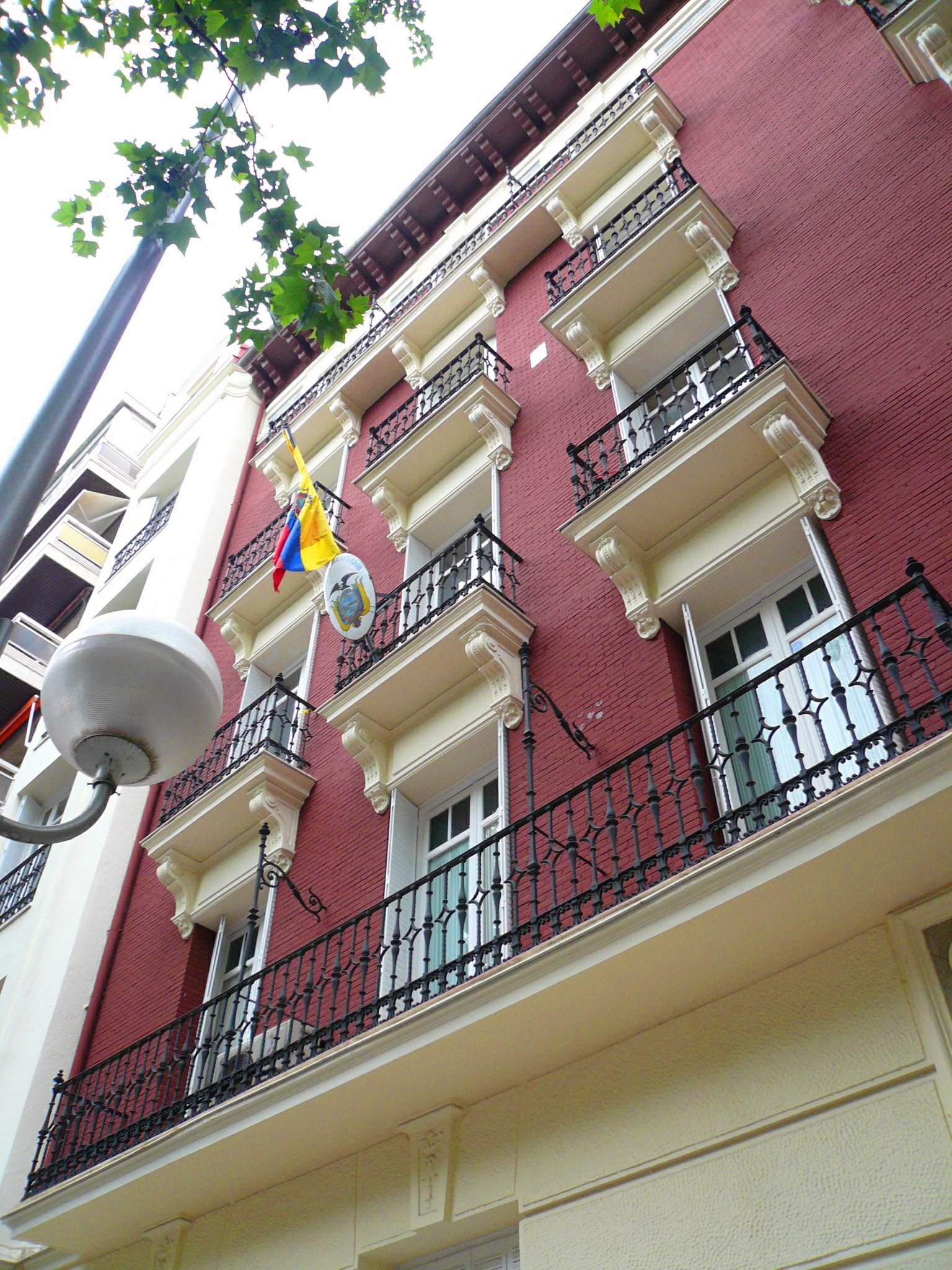
Embassy of Ecuador in Madrid

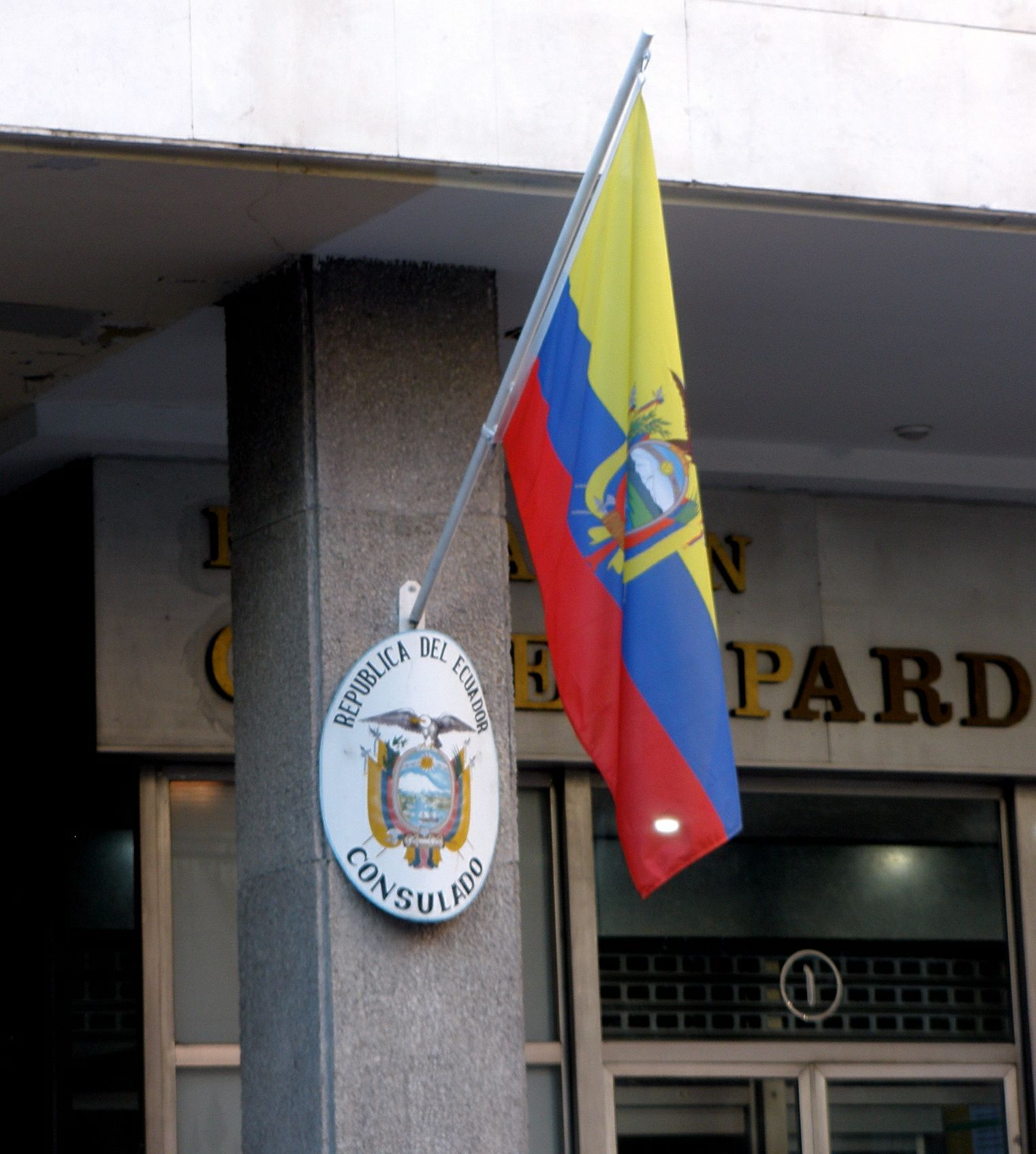
Consulate-General of Ecuador in Madrid

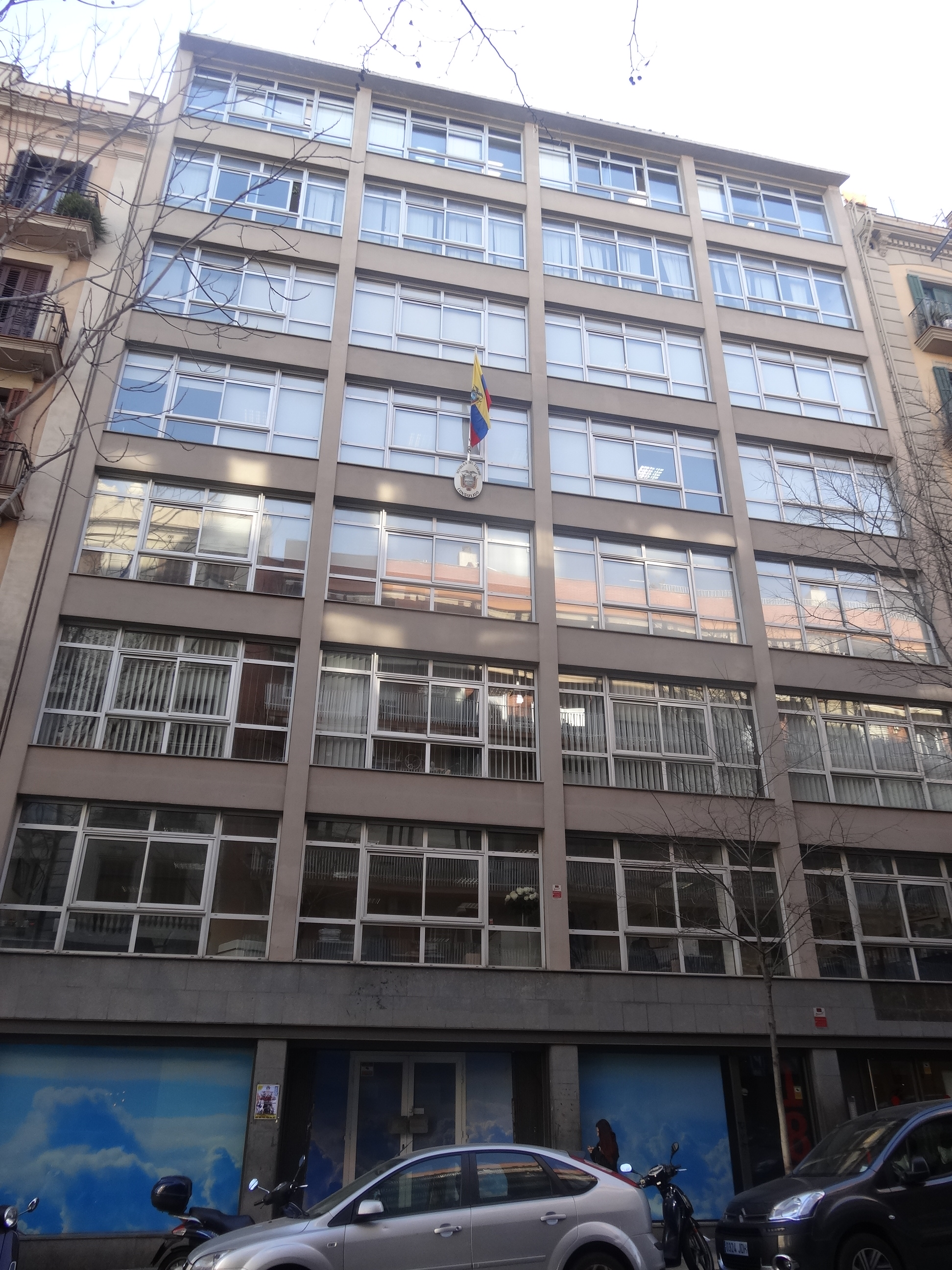
Consulate-General of Ecuador in Barcelona

== See also ==
- Foreign relations of Ecuador
- Foreign relations of Spain
- Ecuadorians in Spain
