= Emigration from Ecuador =

Emigration from Ecuador is a relatively recent phenomenon, but has had a large impact on the country's demographics and economy. Eleven percent of Ecuadorians (1.5 million people) live outside Ecuador, primarily in Spain and the United States. Between 400,000 and 500,000 Ecuadorians were estimated to live in the United States in 2003; nearly 500,000 were estimated to live in Spain in 2005. Ecuadorians have also settled in Italy, the Netherlands, France, and Canada. Ecuadorians living abroad remit $1.7 billion to family in Ecuador each year; an estimated one million Ecuadorians rely on these remittances for income. Only petroleum exports are a greater contribution to Ecuador's economy than remittances, which exceed banana exports and income from tourism in value.

Ecuadorian nationals are residents in more than 60 countries.

Early emigration from Ecuador was triggered by the collapse of Ecuador's Panama hat industry in the 1950s. Emigrants at this time often traveled to New York City, where many had connections with hat importers.

In the United States, Ecuadorians are most concentrated in New York City and New Jersey; approximately 90,000 Ecuadorians live in Queens, particularly in Corona and Jackson Heights.

Alternately, some Ecuadorians arrived with forged visas or on passports with legitimate visas but substituted photos. Ecuadorians typically paid for the journey by borrowing from usurious moneylenders and using their property in Ecuador as collateral.

During the late 1990s financial crisis in Ecuador, a mass migration to Spain occurred. The number of Ecuadorians in Spain climbed from less than 10,000 in 1998 to 200,000 in 2002 to over 500,000 in 2005. This migration was initially led by women. Ecuadorians flew to Spain on tourist visas and stayed to look for work. Spain offered amnesty to undocumented migrants in 2004 and 2005; 140,000 Ecuadorians legalized their status.

Nearly all Ecuadorians who emigrate intend to return to Ecuador, even though many have settled permanently.
