= Colombians in Spain =

Ethnic group in Spain

Colombians in Spain Colombianos en España
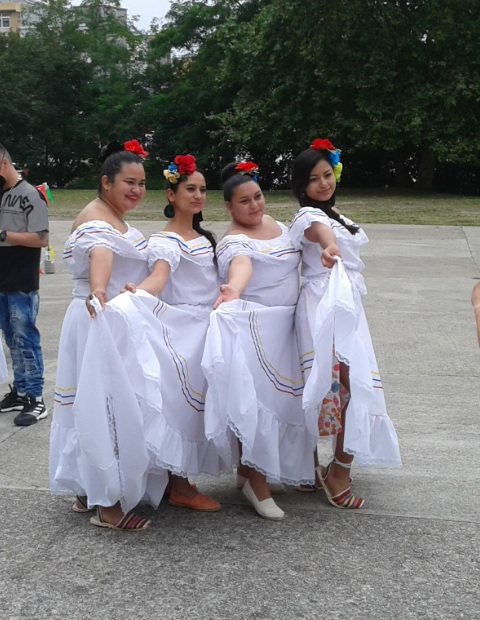

Total population
- 978,041 (1 January 2025)

Regions with significant populations
- Madrid, Barcelona, Valencia

Languages
- Spanish

Religion
- Roman Catholicism

Related ethnic groups
- Argentines in Spain; Uruguayans in Spain

Presence of Colombians in Spain

The presence of Colombians in Spain dates back to the 19th century. Today, Colombians are a large migrant community in Spain, numbering over 1 million. The Colombian community in Spain is one of the biggest diaspora communities of an American country in Europe.

Colombians in Spain are the second largest community of Colombians outside their country after Colombian Americans. Colombians migrate in Spain in large quantities due to various reasons, such as: economic reasons, insecurity in Colombia (related to the Colombian internal conflict), relatively open labor market, less restrictive migration policies compared to the US, more accessible pathways to residency compared to other European states, and shared cultural links as both countries share the same language due to Colombia's history as a Spanish colony.

Colombians in Spain are spread throughout the country, though many of them live in the cities. Their largest concentration is in Madrid. Most of them settled after 2000, mostly in two waves, between 2000 to 2008 and from 2022 till today. In the 2020s, Spain established itself as the main immigration destination for Colombians who move abroad, as the Colombian community in Spain grew by over than 400,000 people between 2022 and 2025.

As of January 2025, 978,041 Colombians lived in Spain, of which 676,534 possessed only Colombian citizenship. The Colombian community in Spain is growing rapidly and many settle in the major cities of Spain such as Madrid, Barcelona, Valencia, Zaragoza and others.

== History and evolution ==
Historical population
Year	Pop.	±%
2002	202,782	—
2003	248,985	+22.8%
2004	259,509	+4.2%
2005	273,496	+5.4%
2006	287,866	+5.3%
2007	309,759	+7.6%
2008	341,223	+10.2%
2009	368,451	+8.0%
2010	376,161	+2.1%
2011	375,852	−0.1%
2012	373,632	−0.6%
2013	364,633	−2.4%
2014	351,350	−3.6%
2015	344,843	−1.9%
2016	343,752	−0.3%
2017	356,812	+3.8%
2018	380,503	+6.6%
2019	424,104	+11.5%
2020	490,877	+15.7%
2021	532,266	+8.4%
2022	564,227	+6.0%
2023	715,655	+26.8%
2024	856,616	+19.7%
2025	978,016	+14.2%
Source: National Statistics Institute (Spain)

Due to the economic problems Colombia has faced periodically, and the security issues, Colombia has seen an increase in emigration since the 1970s. United States and Venezuela (once a major recipient of emigration from Latin America) were the main destinations of the early Colombian diaspora.

Spain began to emerge as a major destination for Colombian emigrants in the 1990s, though Colombians used to migrate in Spain in small numbers during the late decades of the 20th century. The emigration to Spain from Colombia rose dramatically after 1998, as the economic crisis in the country, especially in areas like the Eje Cafetero, led many Colombians to leave their country for better prospects.

The first wave of migration during the 2000s resulted in more than 300,000 people immigrating, with women often working in the domestic help sector, and men in construction. The Spanish economic boom in the 2000s and the shared language helped facilitate the migratory wave.

=== Evolution during the 2010s ===
Between 2010 and 2016, the overall Colombian population decreased by roughly 10% due to emigration as the result of Spain's protracted 2008-2016 economic crisis. A part of the Colombian community in Spain returned to Colombia as the unemployment in Spain rose dramatically, and many Colombians living in the country lost their jobs. Many Colombians were leaving the country each month due to debts or unemployment incurred in Spain. However, a research by the Community of Madrid, that was quoted by the Colombian newspaper El Tiempo in 2012, noted that the Colombians in Spain was the fourth least affected by the crisis migrant community in Spain. The Colombian news outlet Portafolio, reported that in 2012, roughly half of the Colombians in Spain would be interested to return as the economy of their native country was improving.

In 2015, there were 145,490 Colombian nationals in Spain and 203,675 Colombian-born naturalized Spanish citizens. The total Colombian-born population in Spain was 356,475 people in 2015. In 2015, visa requirements for Colombians to enter the Schengen area were lifted, further facilitating migration to the European country, as Colombians no longer needed a visa to arrive in the EU.

In the late 2010s, the improved economic situation in Spain, together with the lifting of the visa requirements for Colombians, led to a second wave of migration. The size of the Colombian community in Spain grew from 343,752 people in 2016 to 490,877 in 2020. In 2019, the Colombian community in Spain had the largest numerical growth than any other migrant community in Spain, growing by more than 62,000 people.

Due to the security problems in Colombia, the number of Colombians who filed an application for asylum in Spain increased from 656 people in 2016 to more than 10 thousand in 2019. By late 2019, roughly 93,000 Colombians lived in Spain in an irregular status, out of nearly 500,000 Colombians in Spain at that time. The majority of those living irregularly worked as domestic workers, in hotels or in construction, and were generally young. In late 2019 roughly the 20% of the irregular migrants living in Spain was born in Colombia.

=== Growth in the 2020s ===
Due to economic reasons, Colombia has seen a large increase in emigration after the COVID-19 pandemic, beginning in late 2021 and especially from 2022. The Colombian diaspora in Spain grew from 564,227 people in January 2022 to 978,016 in January 2025. Spain has become the main destination for the Colombians who seek to emigrate to a European country. Since 2022, roughly 140,000 to 160,000 Colombian citzens migrate to Spain annually, or between 30 and 45 thousand per quarter of the year. Every year, some thousands of Colombians leave Spain to return for Colombia, but the number of returnees varies in every quarter and is far less than the number of those who leave Colombia for Spain.

In the 2020s, many Colombians are immigrating to Spain for studies or better work opportunities. Colombians have the largest number of approved study visas to Spain in the recent years. Many Colombian migrants have university education as well. According to specialists, the reasons who trigger the massive growth in the Colombian community in Spain during the 2020s are basically two: the economy, as the economic situation in Spain looks more favorable to that in Colombia, and the cascade effect as many Colombians already live in Spain and can support their relatives, friends and acquaintances to move there.

Other reasons that triggered the emigration wave of the 2020s were the depreciation of the Colombian peso, a factor that makes working abroad more favorable for better income, social factors, political instability, the security problems, and also the fact that the U.S. migration policies became stricter, making the option of going to Spain more popular.

The largest age group among the Colombian diaspora in Spain as of 2025 are the people aged between 25 and 34. In 2025, the unemployment percentage of Colombians in Spain was 16%. Also, the close cultural connections between Colombia and Spain make, together with the financial problems, also facilitate the growth of a large Colombian minority in Spain. In 2025, around to 300,000 Colombian migrants (without Spanish nationality) contributed in the Spanish social security system.

Due to the precarious security situation in Colombia, a lot of people apply for asylum in Spain. From 2019 to 2025 almost 250,000 Colombians asked for asylum in one of the member states of the European Union, mostly to Spain. For example, almost 40,000 Colombians applied for asylum in Spain in 2024, and in 2023, 53,564. However, lawyers representing Colombian refugees complain that due to Spain's restrictive system, acceptance rates are low.

Today the Colombian community in Spain yields considerable impact in the elections in both their native and host country. For the 2026 Colombian elections, 307,997 resident Colombians in Spain were registered in the electoral rolls, and the presidential campaigns of Iván Cepeda and Abelardo de la Espriella ran events in various Spanish cities for the Colombians resident there. While according to a 2026 survey the political preferences of the naturalised Colombians regarding their voting intention for the future Spanish elections lean slightly to the right, the leftist candidate Iván Cepeda won the vote of the Colombian community in Spain by a slight margin in the 2026 Colombian elections.

=== Other demographic trends ===
Tousands of children in Spain have been born from Colombian-born motners. In 2009, 6,258 children were born by Colombian-born mothers, a number that declined to 4,445 in 2016. After 2016, the number of births from Colombian-born mothers in Spain began to increase again, reaching 12,106 births in 2024. The large increase since 2016, despite the decline of the number of births in Spain in general, is concurrent with the large growth of the Colombian diaspora in Spain since 2016.

As many Colombians migrate in Spain for work, the share of children in the Colombian community in Spain is smaller compared to the general population in both Spain and Colombia. In 2022, only 33,273 people (5.89% of the Colombian community in Spain in 2022) were between the age of 0 and 14 years. In 2025, the number of people aged 0-14 in the Colombian community in Spain had grew to 81,144 (8.29% of the total population of Colombians in Spain in 2025). The increase of the share of children points to the fact that more Colombian families migrate together in Spain, rather than only a part of them.

== Economic situation ==
Many Colombians in Spain work as carers for elderly and in other low paying jobs. There are many people who live in precarious situation. As many people have to leave Colombia for Spain, for various reasons, including the Colombian conflict, many are settling in the country with undocumented status, resulting in lower wages, working in the informal sector, and higher exploitation from employers. As many Colombians arrive in an irregular way in Spain, without registration in the authorities, they often have to resort to work in the informal sector to earn an income. According to the Colombian newspaper La República, some of the informal jobs Colombians take are cleaning houses, delivery jobs, participating in television programs as audience, being apprentices with the promise of future employment in a company, singing or selling sweets. The Colombians in Spain also face the problem of finding good employment opportunities while being non-citizens, the high costs of living and abusive practices they have faced while trying to rent an apartment.

In 2026, when Spain began to implement a major regularisation program for migrants, it became known that Colombians, together with Hondurans and Peruvians are among the nationalities with the highest amount of undocumented migrants living in Spain. According to estimates, 290,000 Colombians lived in Spain in an undocumented status, the highest number among all the other countries.

== Distribution by autonomous community ==
Distribution of Colombian-born residents of Spain by autonomous community
Autonomous community	2025	Percentage of the population	2020	2010	2000
Community of Madrid	199,760	2.8	115,774	89,327	12,503
Valencian Community	164,508	3.0	73,062	52,955	3,478
Catalonia	160,238	2.0	87,838	62,309	5,689
Andalucia	85,679	1.0	39,643	27,861	2,544
Canary Islands	54,362	2.4	34,997	25,870	1,925
Basque Country	45,495	2.0	25,928	17,295	1,481
Castilla-La Mancha	42,298	2.0	21,088	15,570	809
Balearic Islands	41,900	3.4	23,064	12,883	1,039
Castile and León	39,414	1.6	18,557	14,035	1,059
Aragon	35,161	2.6	13,775	9,581	563
Galicia	32,838	1.2	16,580	11,991	1,943
Region of Murcia	23,722	1.5	11,414	7,980	527
Navarre	17,345	2.5	10,213	6,800	699
Asturias	13,987	1.4	6,460	4,482	375
Cantabria	12,175	2.1	6,912	5,594	447
La Rioja (Spain)	9,875	3.0	5,467	4,125	295
Extremadura	6,406	0.6	3,093	2,257	274
Melilla	668	0.7	137	91	8
Ceuta	126	0.2	108	58	10
Total Spain	978,041	2.0	514,110	371,064	35,668

== See also ==
- Spanish Colombian
- Colombia–Spain relations
- Immigration to Spain
- Colombian diaspora
