= Peruvians in Spain =

Peruvians in Spain Peruanos en España
Total population
- 430,277 (2025)

Languages
- Spanish, Quechua, Aymara

Religion
- Roman Catholicism

As of 2025, official statistics showed 430,277 Peruvian-born residents in Spain. Out of these, 169,733 were Spanish citizens and 260,544 had not yet acquired Spanish citizenship.

== 2008–2014 Spanish financial crisis ==
During the 2008–2014 Spanish financial crisis, the Peruvian community decreased somewhat dramatically. In just one year, the Peruvian population in Spain decreased by 23.76%, a figure that places Peru as the country with the greatest dropout of official residents in that nation. The number went from 109,639 official residents in Spain, as of January 1, 2013, to 83,583, as of January 1, 2014. That is, 26,055 fewer Peruvians among the foreign population in the country, according to information disseminated by the National Institute of Statistics (INEI).

The population has since recovered and increased since the end of the economic downturn.

== See also ==
- Peru–Spain relations
- Peruvian diaspora
- Immigration to Spain
- Spanish immigration to Peru

== Sources ==
- "Población extranjera por sexo, país de nacionalidad y edad (hasta 85 y más).", Avance del Padrón a 1 de enero de 2009. Datos provisionales, Spain: Instituto Nacional de Estadística, 2009
