= Himilco =

Carthaginian navigator and explorer

- Occupation: Explorer
- Years active: 5th century BC
- Known for: Naval exploration of the western coast of Europe
- Works: Now-lost periplus about his journey
- Family: Magonid

Himilco (fl. early 5th century BC) was a Carthaginian navigator and explorer, cited by later Greek and Roman authors as one of the earliest explorers from the Mediterranean Sea to reach the northwestern shores of Europe. Himilco's now-lost account, sometimes referred to as the Periplus of the Northern Sea, survives only in brief notices preserved by Pliny the Elder and Avienus. According to these sources, Himilco sailed beyond the Pillars of Heracles (modern Strait of Gibraltar) along the Atlantic seaboard, probably reaching Brittany and possibly the British Isles.

== Life ==
Little to nothing is known of Himilco's life. He was contemporary with the Carthaginian explorer Hanno, who traveled south along the coast of West Africa. According to Duane W. Roller, they probably belonged to the Magonid family, and were perhaps brothers. Stéphane Gsell, followed by B. H. Warmington, suggested that Hanno and Himilco were the sons of Hamilcar I, who died in 480 BC at the battle of Himera. The date of Himilco's travel depends on that of Hanno, which is itself uncertain, but was perhaps shortly after 500 BC.

== Sources ==
The lost account of his adventures, known as Periplus of the Northern Sea, is later mentioned by the Roman writers Pliny (1st c. AD) and Avienus (4th c. AD).

Pliny records that Himilco was sent to learn what was beyond the extremities of Europe at the same time as Hanno was sent to the African coast. Pliny's citation of Himilco in a catalogue of African explorers and his use of his report in his African book seems to indicate that Himilco also travelled south.

The other extant record of his journey, Avienus's Ora maritima, does not list Himilco in the sources for his poem, but Avienus mentions that he learned about the Carthaginian from ancient Punic records. The explorer is named three times in the poem, with only sparse information.

== Travel ==
=== Background ===
Scholars have debated whether Himilco's expedition served official Carthaginian trade interests to monopolise the tin and lead trade, or whether it was undertaken independently. No specific benefit of the voyage for Carthage is mentioned by ancient sources, though some scholars suggest possible intentions of colonisation. According to Roller, Himilco may have been dispatched to explore the far north-western limits of Europe in response to reports from Tartessos (and possibly Greek traders) of wealthy lands beyond the continent, which perhaps included tin sources. The Tartessians are known to have exploited the British tin trade in the 7th and 6th centuries BC.

Himilco's exploration took place beyond what were then considered the limits of Europe, although Greek sailors such as the Phocaeans and Massalians had already reached at least Ophiussa (modern Portugal), and possibly north-western Brittany. Whether Himilco was aware of these earlier expeditions is uncertain due to Greek secrecy about their expeditions.

=== Reports ===
According to Avienus, Himilco reached a coastal zone about four days of travel beyond the Pillars of Heracles, which was then used by the fishermen of Gades. The Ora maritima gives little concrete information about his voyage, but mentions a "Sacred Island" (Sacra Insula), inhabited by the Hierni, two days from the Oestrymnides, and a nearby island inhabited by the Albiones.

Under the head of this promontory, the Oestrymnic bay lies open for the natives. In it the islands called Oestrymnides stretch themselves out. They lie widely apart and are rich in tin and lead.

[...]

But from here, there is a two-day journey for a ship to the Holy Island—thus the ancients called it. This island, large in extent of land, lies between the waves. The race of Hierni inhabits it far and wide. Again, the island of the Albiones lies near, and the Tartessians were accustomed to carry on business to the ends of the Oestrymnides. Colonists of Carthage, too, and the common folk living around the Pillars of Hercules came to these seas. Himilco of Carthage reported that he himself had investigated the matter on a voyage, and he asserts that it can scarcely be crossed in four months. No breezes propel a craft, the sluggish liquid of the lazy sea is so at a standstill. He also adds this: a lot of seaweed floats in the water and often after the manner of a thicket holds the prow back. He says that here nonetheless the depth of the water does not extend much and the bottom is barely covered over with a little water. They always meet here and there monsters of the deep, and beasts swim amid the slow and sluggishly crawling ships.

— Avienus, Ora Maritima, 90–115, transl. Murphy

Himilco reached this Sacred Island, though the difficult journey reportedly took four months instead of two days. Such an exaggeration has often been interpreted as Carthaginian misdirection, but it may also be a vestige of the total length of Himilco's cruise, perhaps showing that he went elsewhere, such as the Atlantic islands. However, Himilco is unlikely to have reached the Sargasso Sea, as it was sometimes mentioned in earlier scholarship, since it lies far out in the western Atlantic beyond the Azores and well outside the range of his probable route.

Reconstructed Periplus of Himilco

All three citations of Himilco's voyage in Avenius's poem stress its hazards: a windless, sluggish sea choked with seaweed that hindered ships, shallow shoals, frequent fog, vast rolling swells, and even sea monsters, together conveying the impression of a difficult and dangerous northern passage. It is probable that Himilco exaggerated the danger and difficulty to glorify his achievement, and perhaps to discourage Greek sailors from trade competition.

=== Reconstructed route ===
Scholars have argued that the conditions described by the sources plausibly reflect a coastal voyage toward Brittany, and perhaps beyond towards the British Isles if the reported two-day distance from the Oestrymnides (presumably part of Brittany) is reliable.

The "Sacred Island", hierà nêsos (ἱερὰ νῆσος), mentioned in the Ora maritima may correspond to the ancient Greek name for Ireland, Iérnē (Ἰέρνη), although this remains speculative. This has led some scholars to suggest that Himilco may have been the first Mediterranean sailor to reach and record Ireland's name, which otherwise does not reappear in surviving literature until the 1st century BC.

Avienus may also have drawn from Himilco's report the ethnonym Albiones, which is related to the ancient name for Britain, Albion. The Albiones were known to the Tartessians, which may have led the Carthaginians to seek to investigate the region.

Possible identification of names
	Correspondance	Note	Sources
Oestrymnides	Ostimii (mentioned by Pytheas)	Gallic tribe from the extremity of the Brittany peninsula, later attested as Osismii by Caesar (mid-1st c. BC)	
Albiones	Albion (Britain)	Island mentioned by Avienus	
hierà nêsos	? Iérnē (Ireland)	"Sacred Island" mentioned by Avienus as lying close to Albiones and inhabited by the Hierni	

== See also ==
- Hanno the Navigator
- Pytheas
- Periplus
