= Sefes =

Ancient Iberian people

The Sefes, sometimes also known as Cempsi, were a people of ancient Iberia said to have lived on the coast of modern day Portugal and Galicia.

In his poem Ora Maritima, the 4th century Roman author Avienius wrote that they were neighbours of the Cynetes, placing them in an upland district of the Ophiussa region (near the mouth of the Tagus) close to an island he named Poetanion and that, along with another tribe called the Cempsi they had taken that territory by force from the previous rulers.
