= Timeline of Iberian prehistory =

== Paleolithic ==
- c. 1.5 to 1.8 million years Before Present (BP) Paleolithic – Tools used by hominids at Orce in the province of Granada
- c. 1 million years BP – Tools used by hominids living near Burgos
- c. 200,000 BP – In the Paleolithic period the Neanderthal Man enters the Iberian Peninsula.
- c. 70,000 BP
  - Neanderthal Mousterian culture.
  - Beginning of the Last Ice Age.
- c. 50,000 years BP – Ancient mtDNA was partially sequenced in HVR region for three distinct Neanderthals from El Sidrón cave near Piloña province of Asturias
- 40th millennium BC
  - Beginning of the Upper Paleolithic.
  - The first large settlement of Europe by modern humans, nomadic hunter-gatherers coming from the steppes of central Asia. When the Ice Age reached its maximum extent, these modern humans took refuge in southern Europe, namely in Iberia, and in the steppes of southern Ukraine and Russia.
- 35th millennium BC – Beginning of the Neanderthal Châtelperronian cultural period, emanating from Southern France.
- 33rd millennium BC – Beginning of the modern human Aurignacian culture in Europe.
- 30th millennium BC – modern humans make way into the Iberian Peninsula, coming from Southern France. Here, this genetically homogenous population (characterized by the M173 mutation in the Y chromosome), will supposedly develop the M343 mutation, giving rise to the R1b Haplogroup, still dominant in modern Portuguese and Spanish populations.
- 28th millennium BC
  - Extinction of the Neanderthal Man in its last refuge – the west of Iberia (in modern Portugal).
  - Gravettian culture in Europe.
- 20th millennium BC
  - Solutrean cultural period in Europe.
  - Pre-historic art in the Vila Nova de Foz Côa (near modern Vila Nova de Foz Côa, in Portugal), one of the biggest sites in Europe.
- 15th millennium BC – Magdalenian cultural period in Europe.

== Mesolithic ==
- 10th millennium BC
  - The end of the Pleistocene era.
  - Homo heidelbergensis living near Burgos, in the Atapuerca Mountains, at start of Holocene (the current ongoing warm climate period, during which modern human civilization has prospered)
  - The Allerød Oscillation occurs, an interstadial Deglaciation that weakens the rigorous conditions of the Ice Age.
  - End of Upper Palaeolithic and beginning of the Mesolithic period.
  - The populations sheltered in Iberia, descendants of the Cro-Magnon, given the deglaciation, migrate and recolonize all of Western Europe, thus spreading the R1b Haplogroup populations (still dominant, in variant degrees, from Iberia to Scandinavia).
  - Azilian culture in Southern France and Northern Iberia (to the mouth of the Douro river).
  - Muge Culture in the Tagus valley.

== Neolithic ==
Iberian Middle Bronze Age

Iberian Late Bronze Age

- 5th millennium BC
  - Beginning of the Neolithic in the Iberian Peninsula.
  - Autochthonous development of Agriculture in Iberia.
  - Beginning of the Megalithic European culture, spreading to most of Europe and having one of its oldest and main centres in the territory of modern Portugal.
  - The Nomadic Hunter-gatherers of the R Haplogroup (characterized by the M173 mutation in the Y chromosome) that had taken refuge during the Last Ice Age in the Steppes of southern Ukraine and Russia (and had allegedly developed the M17 mutation, originating the R1a Haplogroup), are believed to have given rise to the Proto-Indo-European cultures (predecessors of the Indo-European population and their languages), such as the Kurgan culture.

== Chalcolithic ==
- 3rd millennium BC
  - Chalcolithic culture of Vila Nova, a Megalithic European culture, around the area of modern Lisbon.
  - Beaker culture spreads to most of Western Europe (Portugal, Spain, France (excluding the central massif), Great Britain and Ireland, the Low Countries, and Germany from the Elbe valley west, with an extension along the upper Danube into the Vienna Basin in Austria, with Mediterranean outposts on Sardinia and Sicily).

== See also ==
- Prehistoric Iberia
- History of Portugal
- History of Spain
- Timeline of pre-Roman Iberian history
- Timeline of Spanish history
- Timeline of Spanish history (Hispania)
- Timeline of Portuguese history
- Roman Lusitania and Gallaecia (3rd Century BCE to 4th Century CE)
