= Periplus of the Euxine Sea =

2nd-century guidebook by Arrian

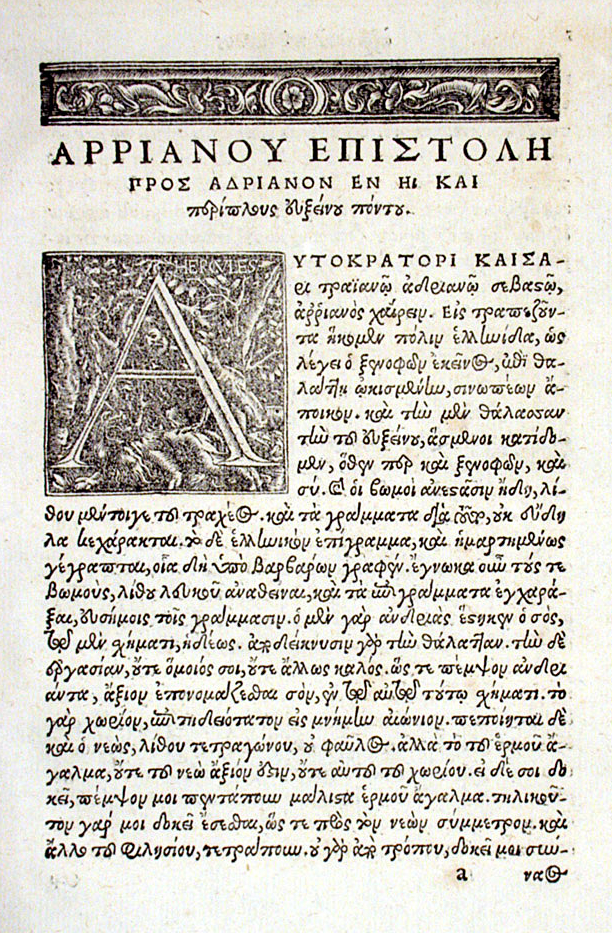
Arrian, Periplus

Greek colonies of the Euxine Sea from 8th to 3rd century BCE.

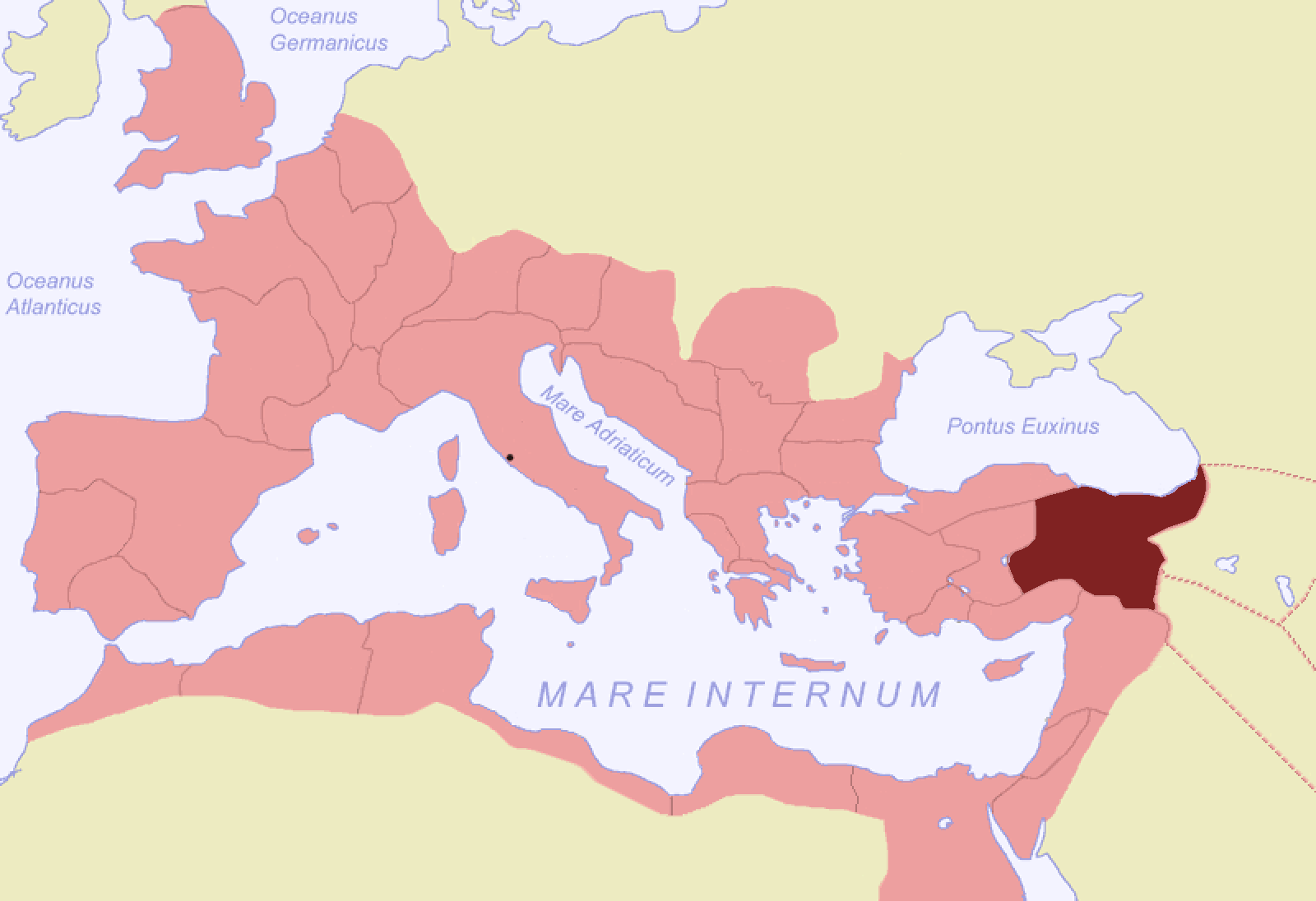
The Roman province of Cappadocia on the shore of the Euxine Sea, which Arrian was governor of.

The Periplus of the Euxine Sea (Koine Greek: Περίπλους τοῦ Εὐξείνου Πόντου, Períplous toû Euxeínou Póntou, Latin: Periplus Ponti Euxini) is a periplus or guidebook detailing the destinations visitors would encounter when traveling about the shore of the Black Sea (known to the Greeks as the Euxine, or Hospitable, Sea). It was written by Arrian of Nicomedia from AD 130–131.

== Background ==
It is in the form of a letter, from Arrian to the Emperor Hadrian in Rome, who was particularly attached to geographical research and had visited in person a large portion of his extensive dominions. It contains an accurate topographical survey of the coasts of the Euxine (Black Sea), from Trapezus to Byzantium, and was written probably while Arrian held his office of legate of Cappadocia, a short time before war broke out against the Alani; and it was doubtless at the same time that he drew up his instructions for the march of the Roman army against the barbarians, which are found in a short but imperfect fragment annexed to the Techne Taktika, written, as he states himself, in the twentieth year of the reign of the emperor, and containing, after a brief account of former writers on the same subject, a description of the order and arrangement of an army in general.

Its purpose was to inform the emperor of the "lay of the land" and provide him with necessary information such as the distances between cities and the locations that would provide safe harbor for ships in a storm in the eventuality that Hadrian should mount a military expedition to the region.

The Periplus contains, according to Gibbon's epigrammatic expression in his 42nd chapter, "whatever the governor of Cappadocia had seen from Trebizond to Dioscurias; whatever he had heard, from Dioscurias to the Danube; and whatever he knew, from the Danube to Trebizond." Thus, while Arrian gives much information upon the south and east side of the Euxine, in going round the north shore his intervals become greater, and his measurements less precise.

== See also ==
- Bithynia and Pontus
- Cappadocia (Roman province)
- Roman Armenia
- Roman Crimea
- Moesia
- Thracia
