= Osismii =

Gallic tribe

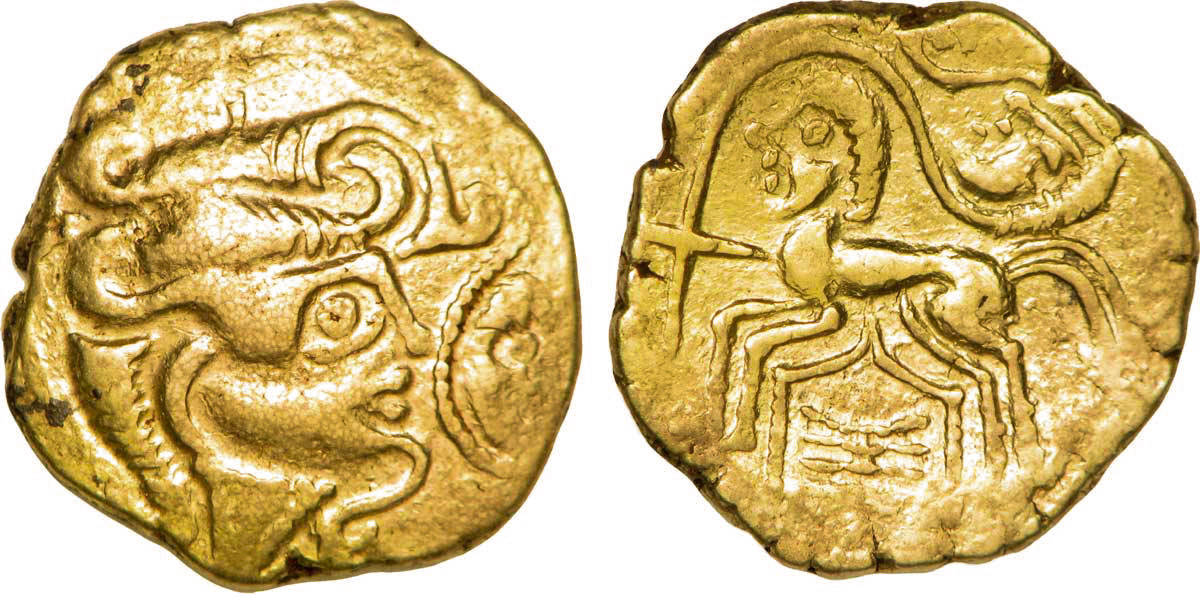
Electrum stater depicting a tent and a severed head, minted by the Osismii. ca. 80–50 BC.

The Osismii or Ostimii were a Gallic tribe living in the western part of the Armorican Peninsula (modern Brittany) during the Iron Age and the Roman period.

== Etymology ==
They are mentioned as Osismi (var. ossismi) by Caesar (mid-1st c. BC), O̓sísmioi (Ὀσίσμιοι) by Strabo (early 1st c. AD), Ossismos by Pliny (1st c. AD), O̓sismíous (Ὀσισμίους; var. Ὀσίσμιοι, Ὀσισμαίους) by Ptolemy (2nd c. AD), and as Osismis in the Notitia Dignitatum (5th c. AD).

According to Strabo, the Massaliote explorer Pytheas, who travelled to northwestern Europe in the late 4th century BC, reported the variant Ōstimíous (Ὠστιμίους), which seems to be the earliest attested form of the name, documented before the Gaulish sound shift -st- > -ss- occurred.

The Gaulish ethnonym Ostim(i)i (sing. Ostim(i)os) literally means 'the ultimate', that is to say 'the remotest people', 'those who dwell at the extremity of the Armorican Peninsula'. It derives from the Celtic stem ostim- ('ultimate, extreme'), itself from an earlier *postim- ('last'; cf. Lat. postumus 'last-born, final'). In Middle French, the territory they occupied was known as (Fine) Posterne.

== Geography ==
The territory of the Osismii was located at the extremity of the Brittany Peninsula, west of the Veneti and Coriosolites.

Civitas of the Osismii during the Roman period

According to the consensus view summarised by Patrick Galliou, following Pierre Merlat and François Merlet, the territory of the Osismii extended across most of modern Finistère, parts of the Côtes-d'Armor (with Trégor and Goëlo regions), and slightly into Morbihan. It was bounded roughly from the Gouët estuary at Saint-Brieuc in the north to the Ellé at Quimperlé in the south, a distribution corroborated by the spread of their pre-Roman coinage.

Their chief town was Vorgium (present-day Carhaix), which the Tabula Peutingeriana places at the tip of the Armorican peninsula. Ptolemy names Vorganium as the chief town of the Osismii. However, a milestone from northern Finistère suggests that Vorganium more likely refers instead to Kérilien (in Plounéventer), which was a different settlement in Gallo-Roman times and makes Ptolemy's identification probably incorrect.

Scholars often attribute the decline of Vorgium to a transfer of capital status. The creation of the Tractus Armoricanus prompted the construction of coastal fortifications against Saxon piracy, shifting strategic priorities toward the coast and leading to the erection of a major castellum at Brest. In the early Middle Ages, Brest appears under the names Civitas Osismorum and Urbs Osismi, probably derived from a 4th-century Osismis mentioned in the Notitia Dignitatum.

== History ==
=== Early accounts (5th–4th centuries BC) ===
Some scholars identify the Oestrymnici of Armorica, mentioned in the Ora Maritima of Avianus (4th century AD), with the Osismii. Avianus's poem preserves earlier geographical accounts derived from the voyage of the Carthaginian navigator Himilco in the late 6th–early 5th century BC. If this connection is correct, it would place a people identifiable with the Osismii in Armorica already around 500 BC.

Reconstructed Periplus of Himilco c. 500 BC

Here rises the head of a projecting ridge, which a more ancient age called Oestrymnis, and the lofty mass or rocky height completely faces the warm south wind Under the head of this promontory, the Oestrymnic bay lies open for the natives. In it the islands called Oestrymnides stretch themselves out. They lie widely apart and are rich in tin and lead. There is much hardiness in the people here, a proud spirit, an efficient industriousness. They are all constantly concerned with commerce. They ply the widely troubled sea and swell of monster-filled Ocean with skiffs of skin. For these men do not know how to fashion keels with pine or maple. They do not hollow out yachts, as the custom is, from fir trees. Rather they always marvellously fit out boats with joined skins and often run through the vast salt water on leather ... This place was first called Oestrymnis and the people inhabiting the area and the fields Oestrymnici. Afterwards numerous serpents put the inhabitants to flight and gave the evacuated land their name.

— Avienus, Ora Maritima, 90–115, 154–159, transl. Murphy

Around 320–300 BC, they are mentioned as Ōstimíous (Ὠστιμίους) by the Greek explorer Pytheas, whose account is reported by Strabo in the 1st century AD. Pytheas noted that the peninsula projected deep into the Ocean and ended at a headland called Kabaïon, identifiable with either the Point Penmarc'h or the Pointe du Raz. He also mentioned the nearby islands of Ouximasa, which is plausibly linked to Celtic Uxisama ('the highest') and often associated with modern Ushant.

Secondly, there are the Osismii (whom Pytheas calls the Ostimii), who live on a promontory that projects quite far out into the ocean, though not so far as he and those who have trusted him say.

— Strabo 1917, Geōgraphiká, 4:4:1.

=== Gallic Wars (58–50 BC) ===
The Osismii submitted to Caesar during the Gallic Wars in 58 BC.

At the same time he was informed by Publius Crassus, whom he had sent with one legion to the Veneti, Unelli, Osismi, Curiosolites, Essuvii, Aulerci, Redones—coastal communities that border the Ocean—that all those communities had been brought into the control and power of the Roman people

— Caesar, Gallic Wars, II.34, transl. Loeb

However, they took part in an insurrection against Rome in 56 BC.

Adopting this plan, [the Veneti] fortified their towns, brought provisions from the farmland into the towns, and collected as many boats as they could in the territory of the Veneti, where everyone agreed that Caesar would fight first. Their allies for that war were the Osismi, Lexovii, Namnetes, Ambiliati, Morini, Diablintes, Menapii. Auxiliary forces were summoned from Britain, which lies opposite that area.

— Caesar, Gallic Wars, III.9, transl. Loeb

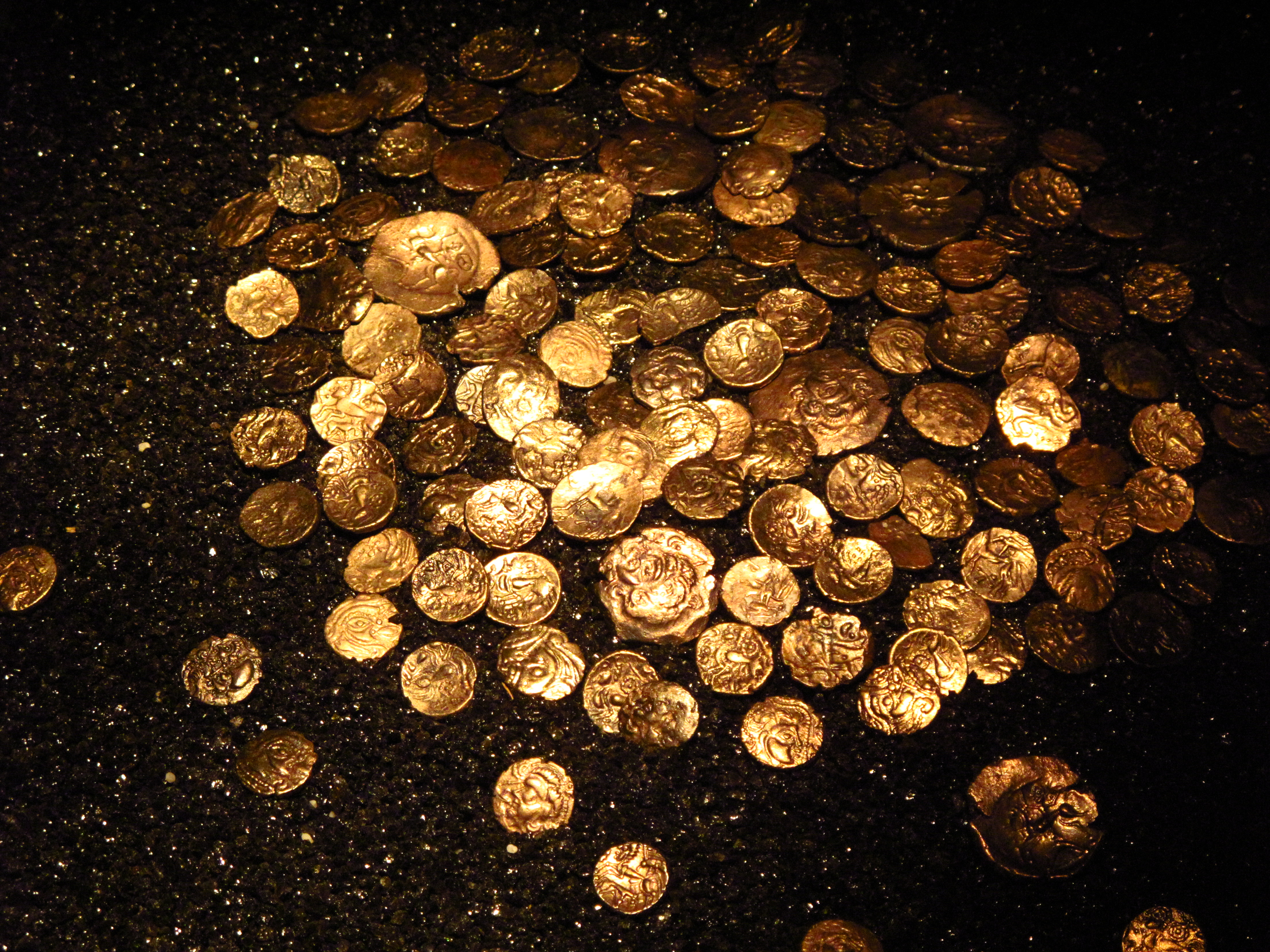
Electrum coins from the civitas of the Osismi, ca. 50 BC.

In 52 BC, they sent troops to the Battle of Alesia.

A round ten thousand from all the communities that border the Ocean and customarily call themselves 'Armorican': the Curiosolites, Redones, Ambibarii, Caletes, Osismi, Veneti, †Lemovices†, and Unelli

— Caesar, Gallic Wars, VII.75, transl. Loeb

== Economy ==
The Osismii issued an abundant and varied coinage. The largest hoard attributed to them was found in 2007 at Laniscat (Côtes-d'Armor), during a rescue excavation. It comprised 547 base-gold coins, 57 staters and 490 quarter-staters. They were recovered within the enclosure of a large aristocratic farmstead at the eastern edge of Osismian territory, close to the Veneti and the Coriosolites. On the assumption that Armorican gold coinage was progressively debased over time, the low gold content of these coins suggests a late issue. The hoard has been dated to the 1st century BC, with deposition placed either around the middle of the century or in its second half.

== See also ==
- Veneti (Gaul)
- List of Celtic tribes
