= Xunta of the Kingdom of Galicia =

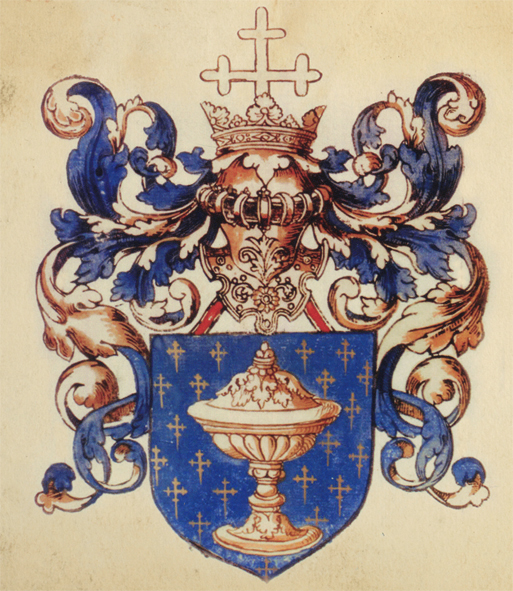
Arms of the Kingdom of Galicia, in L´armorial Le Blancq, Bibliothèque nationale de France, 1560

The Xunta, Xunta General, Xuntas, or Cortes of the Kingdom of Galicia was the representative assembly of the Kingdom of Galicia from the 1528 —when it originated as a general assembly of all the powers of the Kingdom aimed at the constitution of hermandades (brotherhood)— and until 1834, when the Kingdom and its General Assembly were officially disbanded by a Royal decree. It declared itself the supreme authority of the Kingdom from June 18, 1808, during the Peninsular War and due to the abdication of the King, and until Galicia was conquered by the Napoleonic troops in 1809.

== History ==
Initially the Xuntas Generales del Reino de Galicia was an assembly where representatives of the three states of the Kingdom (noblemen, churchmen, and the commoners) met. But soon it followed the evolution prompted by the King of Spain in other representative institutions, such as the Cortes of Castile, so becoming monopolized by the bourgeoisie and lesser nobility (fidalgos), who controlled most of the local councils of the cities and towns of the Kingdom, and at the expenses of Church and nobility. From 1599 the composition of the assembly became fixed and reduced to just seven deputies, each one representing one of the Kingdom provinces, and appointed by the council of the province's capital —Santiago de Compostela, A Coruña, Betanzos, Lugo, Mondoñedo, Ourense, and Tui— from among its members. Other towns, namely Viveiro and Pontevedra, tried during the 17th and 18th century to regain a direct representative in the assembly, to no effect.

The Xunta, whilst having little direct intervention in law making, and not much control over the Royal administration, could nevertheless raise armies, ships and taxes, conceding or denying the King's petitions on behalf of all the local powers of the Kingdom; the assembly could also petition the King himself, this being the usual mean it used for modifying or approving laws, or for promoting the interests of the Kingdom. The Xunta was also recognized as the voice and representative of the Kingdom, and the depositary of its will, traditions and rights (foros).

Notwithstanding, the King never consented on the petition of the assembly to meet at will, and from 1637 he decreed that the meetings of the assembly can only take place when in presence of one representative of the monarch, with voice, usually the Governor-Captain General of the Kingdom, so trying to maintain a tighter grip on the institution and its agreements. From the 18th century, with the advent of the absolutists Bourbon monarchs, the Xunta was gradually deprived of its powers.

== Bibliography ==
- De Artaza, Manuel María (1998), Rey, Reino y representación. La Junta General del Reino de Galicia, Madrid: CSIC, ISBN 84-00-07779-2
- Fernández-Villamil Alegre, Enrique (1962), Juntas del Reino de Galicia: historia de su nacimiento, actuaciones y extinción, Instituto de Estudios Políticos
