= Timeline of Hispania =

This section of the timeline of Hispania concerns Spanish and Portuguese history events from the Carthaginian conquests (236 BC) to before the barbarian invasions (408 AD).

== 3rd century BC ==
- 236 BC - The Carthaginian General Hamilcar Barca enters Iberia with his armies through Gadir.
- 228 BC - Hamilcar Barca dies in battle. He is succeeded in command of the Carthaginian armies in Iberia by his son-in-law Hasdrubal, who extends the newly acquired empire by skillful diplomacy, and consolidates it by the foundation of Carthago Nova (Cartagena) as the capital of the new province.
- 226 BC - Hasdrubal the Fair, who ruled relatively independently of Carthage, signed the Ebro treaty with Rome, which fixed the river Ebro as the boundary between the two powers. Under the terms of the treaty, Carthage may not expand north of the Ebro, as long as Rome likewise may not expand to the south of the river.

Carthaginian conquests in Iberia

- 221 BC - Hasdrubal is killed by a Celtic slave. Hannibal Barca, Hamilcar Barca's older son, is acclaimed commander-in-chief by the army and confirmed in his appointment by the Carthaginian Senate.
- 220 BC - Hannibal capture the Vaccean cities of Helmantica (Salamanca) and Arbucala (Zamora).
- 219 BC
  - Hannibal defeated a combined force of Vaccaei, Olcades and Carpetani, thus completing his conquest of Hispania south of the Ebro with the exception of Saguntum.
  - Beginning of the siege of Saguntum. The city call for Roman aid and the Roman Senate sends envoys to declare the city under Roman protection, which is disregarded by Hannibal.
- 218 BC
  - Hannibal Barca takes Saguntum with the aid of the Turboletae and departs for the Italian peninsula in order to attack the Romans in their own territory. His younger brother Hasdrubal Barca is left in the command of the Carthaginian armies in Iberia.
  - Beginning of the Second Punic War between Carthage and Rome.
  - A Roman army under Gnaeus Cornelius Scipio Calvus defeat an outnumbered Carthaginian army near Cissa, thus gaining control of the territory north of the Ebro River that Hannibal had just subdued a few months prior in the summer. This is the first battle the Romans ever fought in Iberia.
  - Scipio and the Roman army winter at Tarraco. Hasdrubal retire to Cartagena after garrisoning allied towns south of the Ebro.
- 217 BC
  - Hasdrubal Barca launch a joint expedition to destroy the Roman base north of the Ebro River, but is defeated after a surprise attack by the Roman ships, who completely annihilate the Carthaginian naval contingent.
  - After the battle of Ebro River, Hasdrubal dismiss the Iberian crews, sparking a rebellion in the Trudetani tribe.
  - During the fall, Publius Cornelius Scipio joins his brother Gnaeus Cornelius Scipio Calvus, reinforcing the Roman troops.
- 216 BC
  - The Scipio brothers raid Barcid possessions in Iberia and Balearic Islands and recruit auxiliary troops from Iberian tribes, consolidated their hold north of the Ebro River. They also encourage Iberian tribes friendly with the Romans to raid tribes loyal to Carthage beyond the Ebro.
  - Hasdrubal spend the year in subduing the Iberian tribes, with little effort made to confront the Romans.
- 215 BC
  - The Romans lay siege to Ibera, a small Iberian town allied to Carthage. Hasdrubal march north with his field army to the Ebro, but besiege a town allied with the Romans across Dertosa instead. The Scipios lift their siege and move to engage Hasdrubal, defeating him in the battle of Dertosa.
  - The Romans retake Saguntum and go deeper into Iberia.
- 212 BC - The Romans and their Edetani allies invade Turboletania, seize the capital Turba and raze it to the ground, selling his residents to slavery.
- 211 BC
  - Large Carthaginian counter-offensive led by Hasdrubal Barca, his brother Mago Barca and Hasdrubal Gisco. Publius Cornelius Scipio and his brother Gnaeus Cornelius Scipio Calvus are killed in the Battles of the Upper Baetis. Carthaginian victory.
  - Rome send reinforcements to Iberia under the command of Gaius Claudius Nero, but Nero scores no spectacular victories.
- 210 BC
  - Arrival of Publius Cornelius Scipio Africanus, the son of Publius Scipio, with 10,000 Roman troops in Iberia.
  - The Roman general Scipio Africanus conquers Carthago Nova.
- 209 BC - The three Carthaginian armies remain separated, and their generals at odds with each other, thus giving the Romans a chance to deal with them one by one.
- 208 BC
  - Scipio move against Hasdrubal, whose force wintered at Baecula, inflicting great losses.
  - After the battle, Hasdrubal lead his depleted army over the western passes of the Pyrenees into Gaul, and subsequently into Italy with a mostly Gallic force in an ill-fated attempt to join his brother Hannibal.
  - Scipio retire his army to Tarraco, and manage to secure alliances with most of the native Iberian tribes, who switch side after the recent Roman successes.
- 207 BC
  - Carthaginian reinforcements land in Iberia under Hanno, who soon join Mago Barca. Together they raise a powerful army by heavy recruiting of Celtiberians.
  - Hasdrubal Gisco advance his army from Gades into Andalusia.
  - Scipio send a detachment under Marcus Junius Silanus to strike Mago first. Achieving complete surprise, Silanus fall on the Carthaginian camps, dispersing Mago's Celtiberians and capturing Hanno.
- 206 BC
  - Battle of Ilipa (near Seville) between Roman legions, commanded by Scipio Africanus, and Carthaginian armies, commanded by Hasdrubal Barca and Mago. Roman victory that results in the evacuation of Iberia by the Punic commanders.
  - Gadir surrenders without a fight to the Romans.
- 205 BC - The exhausted Turboletae sue for peace, on which the Roman Senate force them to pay a huge compensation to the surviving citizens of Saguntum.
- 202 BC - End of the Second Punic War with the defeat of Hannibal Barca in the Battle of Zama in North Africa.
- 200 BC - The Latin poet Quintus Ennius records, for the first time, the use of the word Hispania to designate the Iberian peninsula (from the Carthaginian name).

== 2nd century BC ==
- 197 BC
  1st division of Roman Hispania
  - In a first attempt of a Roman provincial administration in Hispania, Gaius Sempronius Tuditanus and M. Helvius divide the peninsula into Hispania Ulterior and Hispania Citerior (the one actually controlled by Rome). These two provinces are to be ruled by Governors with a mandate of one year.
  - The Turdetani rise against their Roman governor.
- 196 BC - The Tuboletae revolt is crushed by Q. Minucius, Praetor of Hispania Citerior, in a pitched battle near the ruins of Turba. Their devastated lands are divided among the Bastetani and Edetani, resulting in their total disappearance.
- 195 BC - Cato the Elder becomes consul, assuming the command of the whole of Hispania. Cato first put down the rebellion in the northeast, then march south and put down the revolt by the Turdetani.
- 193 BC - Consul Marco Fulvio Flaco defeats a coalition of Vacceos, Vettones and Lusones near Toletum (Toledo). The rebelling forces take refuge in the Lusone city of Contrebia Belaisca, which is taken by the consul. The rebellion is over.
- 181 BC
  - The Belli are forced to accept Roman suzerainty by Tiberius Sempronius Gracchus.
  - Several tribes along the Ebro, especially the Lusones, rebel against Roman rule, invading Hispania Ulterior, Ebro valley and Iberic Levante in search of a land on which to live. Beginning of the First Celtiberian War.
- 180 BC
  - Tiberius Sempronius Gracchus, proconsul of Hispania Citerior, frees the city of Caravis (Magallón), a Roman ally, from the Celtiberians.
  - Gracchus conquers Contrebia and the vicinities, dividing this region with the indigenous Roman allies and founding Gracurris (Alfaro) for the dispossessed Celtiberians.
- 179 BC - Tiberius Sempronius Gracchus defeats the Celtiberian coalition in the battle of Moncayo, ending the 1st Celtiberian War.
- 155 BC - Under the command of Punicus first and Caesarus after, the Lusitanians and Vettones reach Gibraltar. There they are defeated by the Praetor Lucius Mummius. Beginning of the Lusitanian War.
- 154 BC
  - Lusitanians, under Caesarus, pillage through Baetica (modern Andalusia).
  - Rome forbid the enlargement of the fortification of Segeda, capital of the Belli, considering an infraction to the treaty with Gracchus in 179 BC. However, the Belli continue the enlargement. Beginning of the 2nd Celtiberian War.
- 153 BC
  - With the advance of the Roman legions led by the Consul Quintus Fulvius Nobilior, the inhabitants of Segeda take refuge in Numantia, a city of the Arevaci tribe.
  - Nobilior destroys the city of Segeda, takes Ocilis (Medinaceli), but is ambushed by the Belli General Caros, leader of the Celtiberian coalition, at the battle of Ribarroya, at the Baldano river valley.
  - Nobilior arrives at the city of Numantia, where he spend the winter without taken it.
- 152 BC - Marcus Claudius Marcellus replaces Nobilior as Consul and takes the Celtiberian cities of Ocilis and Nertobriga. Entrapped, the Numantines surrender. End of the 2nd Celtiberian war.
- 147 BC - Viriathus is acclaimed leader of the Lusitanians.
- 143 BC
  - Viriathus form a league against Rome with several Celtic tribes. The Arevaci are one of these tribes, beginning the second phase of the Numantine War.
  - The governor Quintus Caecilius Metellus Macedonicus attacks the territory of the Vettones, but is not able to take the cities of Numantia and Termantia.
- 142 BC
  - Fabius Servilianus, new Consul of Hispania Ulterior, after having sacked several cities loyal to Viriathus in Baetica and southern Lusitania, is defeated by the Lusitanians in Erisane (in Baetica).
  - Fabius Servilianus, after the defeat, declare Viriathus to be a Friend of the Rome.
- 141 BC - After suffering severe defeats, the general Quintus Pompeius secretly negotiate a peace with the city of Numantia.
- 140 BC
  - In Hispania Ulterior, Servilius Cipianus, with the aid of Marcus Popillius Laenas' armies, severely defeat the Lusitanians and oblige Viriathus to take refuge north of the Tagus river.
  - Servilius Cipianus armies also attack the Vettones and the Gallaecians.
- 139 BC
  - The Roman Senate deems Fabius Servilianus' actions unworthy of Rome, and sends Servilius Cipianus to defeat the rebellious tribes of Hispania.
  - Servilius Cipianus founds the Roman cities of Castra Servilia and Caepiana (in the territory of the Celtici).
  - Viriathus send emissaries to negotiate the peace with Servilius Cipianus, but is betrayed and killed in his sleep by his companions, bribed by Marcus Popillius Laenas.
  - Lusitanian armies, now led by Tautalus, still tries a southern incursion against the Romans, but are defeated. End of the Lusitanian War.
- 138 BC - The general Marcus Popillius Laenas don't recognize the peace treaty of 141 BC signed between Quintus Pompeius and the Arevaci, beginning the final phase of the Numantine War.
- 137 BC - Gaius Hostilius Mancinus assault the city of Numantia, but is repulsed several times before being routed and encircled, and so forced to accept a treaty. However, the Roman Senate don't ratify this treaty.
- 136 BC - After crossing the rivers Douro and Minho, Decimus Junius Brutus lays siege and conquers the city of Talabriga, thus defeating the Gallaecians. After the military campaigns, the Roman legions depart south and leave no garrisons.
- 134 BC - The Consul Scipio Aemilianus is sent to Hispania Citerior to end the war against the city of Numantia.
- 133 BC - Scipio builds a ring of seven fortresses around Numantia itself before beginning the siege proper. After suffering pestilence and famine, most of the surviving Numantines commit suicide rather than surrender to Rome. End of the Numantine War and the Celtiberian Wars.
- 123 BC - The Balearic Islands are conquered by Q. Caecilius Metellus, thence surnamed Balearicus. Metellus settle 3,000 Roman and Spanish colonists on the island of Majorca, founding the cities of Palma and Pollentia.
- 105 BC - After the Battle of Arausio, the Germanic Teutons and Cimbri plunder through all north Iberia as far as Gallaecia.
- 102 BC - The Germanic Teutons and Cimbri move out of Iberia to attack the Romans in their native territory in Gaul, where they are defeated in the battles of Aquae Sextiae and Vercellae.

== 1st century BC ==
- 83 BC - The general Quintus Sertorius goes to Iberia for a second time, where he represent the Marian party (of Gaius Marius) against Lucius Cornelius Sulla in the Roman Republican civil wars. Quintus Sertorius Hispanic revolt, where he is joined by the Lusitanians.
- 81 BC - Generalized Roman Republican war in all of Iberia.
- 80 BC - Battle of the Baetis River, where rebel forces under Quintus Sertorius defeat the legal Roman forces of Lucius Fulfidias, governor of Hispania Ulterior. Quintus Sertorius' second in command, Hirtuleius, defeats the governor.
- 79 BC
  - Quintus Sertorius' armies control most of Hispania Ulterior and parts of Hispania Citerior.
  - The appointed governor of Hispania Ulterior, Quintus Caecilius Metellus Pius, attacks the positions of Quintus Sertorius' armies, namely the city of Lacobriga (probably Lagos in the Algarve), but is unable to take it.
- 77 BC
  - Quintus Sertorius is joined by the General Marcus Perperna Vento from Rome, with a following of Roman nobles.
  - Quintus Sertorius defeats the generals Gnaeus Pompeius Magnus and Quintus Caecilius Metellus Pius at the Battle of Saguntum.
  - In this period Quintus Sertorius, through pacts of hospitality and clientele, establishes strong solidarity with local indigenous populations.
- 76 BC
  - Quintus Sertorius defeats Gnaeus Pompeius Magnus near the Pyrenees.
  - In Baetica, Quintus Caecilius Metellus Pius defeats Hirtuleius, who is obliged to flee.
- 75 BC
  - Quintus Caecilius Metellus Pius again defeats Hirtuleius and is able to join his armies with those of Gnaeus Pompeius Magnus.
  - Battle of the Sucro where Quintus Caecilius Metellus Pius, Gnaeus Pompeius Magnus and Lucius Afranius defeat Quintus Sertorius.
- 74 BC - Pompeius founds the city of Pompaelo (modern Pamplona) after being camped in the region. Beginning of the romanization of the Vascones.
- 73 BC
  - Quintus Sertorius loses all the region of Celtiberia (north central Iberia).
  - Pompey and Quintus Cecilius Metellus Pius conquer the Turmodigi and include their lands, corresponding today to the central and western Burgos province and the eastern Palencia province, in Hispania Citerior.
  - The Belli and their Titii allies merge with the pro-Roman Uraci, Cratistii and Olcades tribes to form the Late Celtiberian people of romanized southern Celtiberia.
  - Quintus Sertorius is assassinated at a banquet.
- 72 BC
  - Marcus Perperna Vento assumes the command of Quintus Sertorius' armies, but is swiftly defeated by Gnaeus Pompeius Magnus. Ultimate defeat of Quintus Sertorius' Hispanic revolt.
  - Quintus Caecilius Metellus Pius pacifies and submits Hispania Ulterior. The regions north of the Tagus river are still not effectively occupied by the Roman Republic.
- 61 BC - Julius Caesar is assigned to serve as the Propraetor governor of Hispania Ulterior.
- 60 BC - Julius Caesar wins considerable victories over the Gallaecians and Lusitanians. During one of his victories, his men hail him as Imperator in the field, which is a vital consideration in being eligible for a triumph back in Rome.
- 56 BC - A joint uprising of the Turmodigi, Vaccaei and other people is defeated by the Praetor Metellus Nepote.
- 49 BC
  - The Roman Senate declare Julius Caesar a Public Enemy, beginning the Great Roman Civil War.
  - Julius Caesar enters in Hispania and defeats the legions of Gnaeus Pompeius Magnus' legates, Marcus Terentius Varro, Marcus Petreius and Lucius Afranius, in the battle of Ilerda.
  - Gaius Cassius Longinus, legate of Caesar, is left in Hispania facing growing difficulties in maintaining local populations obedient to Rome.
- 46 BC
  - Pompey's sons Gnaeus Pompeius and Sextus Pompeius, together with Titus Labienus, Caesar's former propraetorian legate (legatus propraetore) and second in command in the Gallic War, escape to Hispania, where they continue to resist Caesar's dominance of the Roman world.
  - November, Julius Caesar arrives in Hispania.
  - Gaius Octavianus and Marcus Vipsanius Agrippa join Julius Caesar in Hispania, where the Civil War continues.
- 45 BC
  - Battle of Munda, in southern Hispania, where, in his last victory, Julius Caesar defeats the Pompeian forces of Titus Labienus and Gnaeus Pompeius.
  - Sextus Pompeius, departing from his garrison at Corduba (in Baetica), roams Hispania Ulterior fighting against its governor (appointed by Julius Caesar), before fleeing for Sicily. End of the Roman Civil War.
  - Julius Caesar, before going back to Rome, leaves his legate governors with the mission of pacifying Hispania and punish the local tribes for their disloyalty.
  - The Greek cities of Emporion and Rhodes lose their autonomy as punishment of their support to the Pompeian party.
- 29 BC - Statilius Taurus make the first important Roman intervention against the tribes of Northern Meseta, beginning the Cantabrian Wars.

Administrative organization of emperor Augustus in 17 BC

- 27 BC
  - Marcus Vipsanius Agrippa divides Hispania into three parts, namely dividing Hispania Ulterior into Baetica (basically Andalusia) and Lusitania (including Gallaecia and Asturias) and attaching Cantabria and the Basque Country to Hispania Citerior.
  - The emperor Augustus returns to Hispania and makes a new administrative division, leaving the provinces as follows: Provincia Hispania Ulterior Baetica (Hispania Baetica), whose capital is Corduba (presently Córdoba); Provincia Hispania Ulterior Lusitania, whose capital is Emerita Augusta (now Mérida); Provincia Hispania Citerior, whose capital is Tarraco (Tarragona), later known as Tarraconensis.
- 26 BC - The Emperor Caesar Augustus, establishes his base in Segisama (near Burgos), beginning a major campaign against the Cantabrians.
- 25 BC
  - Augustus give Brigantum, the camp of Augustan Asturica, to the Brigaeci as a reward for their help. Additionally, he share out land in the plains to the allies. However, later the Asturians join the Cantabrians in the common defense.
  - The Roman general Carisius attack the Astur armies, pursuing them to Mons Medullius. The Roman legions besiege this mountain, but the Astur soldiers prefer to commit suicide rather than surrender.
  - Augustus retire to Tarraco, presumably because of sickness.
- 19 BC - The Astures and Cantabri surrender to Rome, ending the Cantabric Wars.
- 17 BC - Emperor Augustus reorganizes the Hispanic provinces, transferring the Galician, Asturian and Cantabrian territories from the province of Lusitania to the province of Hipania Citerior Tarraconensis.

Administrative organization of Hispania in 212 by emperor Caracalla.

== 1st century ==
- 98 - Trajan, born in Hispania Baetica, becomes Roman Emperor.

Administrative division of Diocletian in 293.

== 2nd century ==
- 117 - Hadrian, born in Hispania Baetica, becomes Roman Emperor.

== 3rd century ==
- 212 - The Emperor Caracalla makes a new administrative division which lasts only a short time. He splits Hispania Citerior again into two parts, creating the new provinces Hispania Nova Citerior and Asturiae-Calleciae.
- 238 - The unified province Tarraconensis or Hispania Citerior is reestablished. Asturias and Gallaecia are again part of it.
- 293 - The new dioecesis Hispaniae become one of the four dioceses governed by a vicarius of the praetorian prefecture of Gaul (also comprising the provinces of Gaul, Upper and Lower Germania and Britannia). The diocese, with capital at Emerita Augusta (modern Mérida), comprise the five peninsular Iberian provinces (Baetica, Gallaecia and Lusitania, each under a governor styled consularis; and Carthaginiensis, Tarraconensis, each under a praeses), the Insulae Baleares and the North African province of Mauretania Tingitana.

== See also ==
- Timeline of Spanish history
- Timeline of pre-Roman Iberian history
