= Periplus =

Manuscript listing ports and coastal landmarks

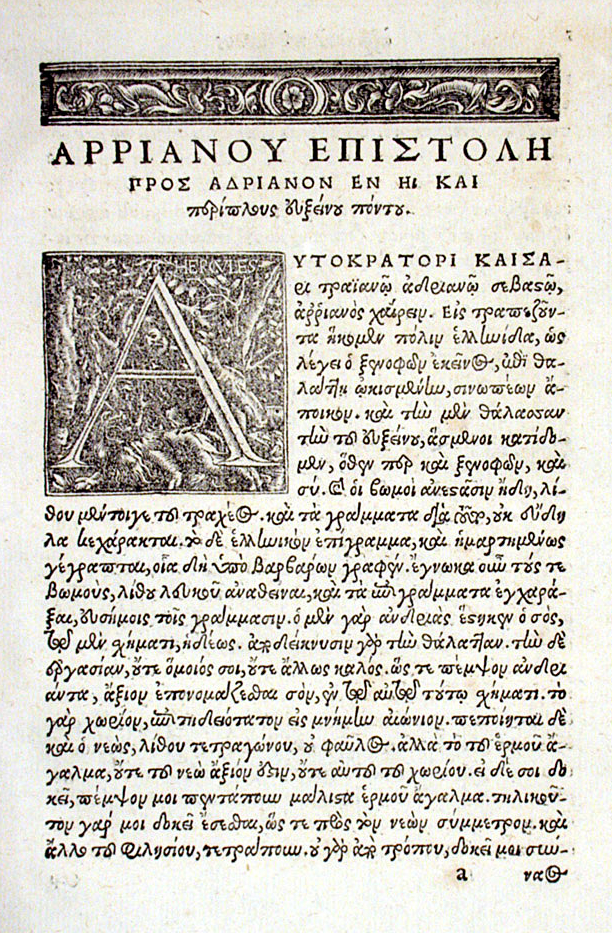
Beginning of the Periplous tou Euxeinou Pontou by Arrian of Nicomedia, Johann Froben and Nicolaus Episcopius, Basel 1533

A periplus (/ˈpɛrɪplʌs/), or periplous, is a manuscript document that lists the ports and coastal landmarks, in order and with approximate intervening distances, that the captain of a vessel could expect to find along a shore. In that sense, the periplus was a type of log, the nautical counterpart of the later Roman itinerarium of road stops. However, the Greek navigators added various notes, which, if they were professional geographers, as many were, became part of their own additions to Greek geography.

The form of the periplus is at least as old as the earliest Greek historian, the Ionian Hecataeus of Miletus. The works of Herodotus and Thucydides contain passages that appear to have been based on peripli.

== Variant ==
A word equivalent in meaning to "periplus" is "periplum", defined in the Oxford English Dictionary as being "[o]riginally and chiefly in the poetry of Ezra Pound" As a noun, Pound uses "periplum" simply to refer to a voyage or journey, as in canto 74, line 3: "The great periplum brings in the stars to our shore." Here the "great periplum" refers to the daily journey made by the Sun God, Helios. "Periplum" is also used in The Cantos adverbially, as seen in this example from canto 59:

Periplum, not as land looks on a map But as sea bord seen by men sailing. (Line 82-4)

In his book ABC of Reading, Pound describes the geography of Homer's Odyssey as "correct geography; not as you would find it if you had a geography book and a map, but as it would be in 'periplum,' that is, as a coasting sailor would find it." Gabriel Levin: "One more night crossing, one more periplum..." Poet Denise Levertov compared Pound's use of the term to the slow panning of a movie camera or looking out a car or train window, while also noting that this would not fully give the reader a full sense of the term's literal meaning as the speed "does not allow for the kind of changes in the beholder that contribute to new perceptions".

== Etymology ==
Periplus is the Latinization of the Greek word περίπλους (periplous, contracted from περίπλοος periploos), which is "a sailing-around" (περι is a prefix meaning around or about, while πλοῦς means "voyage"). Both segments, peri- and -plous, were independently productive: the ancient Greek speaker understood the word in its literal sense; however, it developed a few specialized meanings, one of which became a standard term in the ancient navigation of Phoenicians, Greeks, and Romans.

== Known peripli ==
Several examples of peripli are known to scholars:

=== Carthaginian ===
- The Periplus of Himilco the Navigator, parts which are preserved in Pliny the Elder and Avienius.
- The Periplus of Hanno the Navigator, Carthaginian colonist and explorer who travelled along the coast of Africa from present-day Morocco southward at least as far as Senegal in the sixth or fifth century BCE.

=== Greek ===
- The Periplus of the Greek Scylax of Caryanda, in Caria, who allegedly sailed down the Indus River and then to Suez on the initiative of Darius I. This voyage is mentioned by Herodotus, and his periplus is quoted by Hecataeus of Miletus, Aristotle, Strabo and Avienius.
- The Euthymenes description of West Africa (around third quarter of the sixth century). His published accounts have not survived, but seem to have been known, at least at secondhand, by Plutarch.
- The Massaliote Periplus, a description of trade routes along the coasts of Atlantic Europe, by anonymous Greek navigators of Massalia (now Marseille, France), possibly dates to the sixth century BCE, also preserved in Avienius
- Pytheas of Massilia, (fourth century BCE) On the Ocean (Περί του Ωκεανού), has not survived; only excerpts remain, quoted or paraphrased by later authors, including Strabo, Diodorus Siculus, Pliny the Elder and in Avienius' Ora maritima.
- The Periplus of Pseudo-Scylax, generally is thought to date to the fourth or third century BCE.
- The Periplus of Nearchus surveyed the area between the Indus and the Persian Gulf under orders from Alexander the Great. He was a source for Strabo and Arrian, among others.
- On the Red Sea by Agatharchides. Fragments preserved in Diodorus Siculus and Photius.
- The Periplus of Scymnus of Chios is dated to around 110 BCE.
- The Periplus of the Erythraean Sea or Red Sea was written by a Greek of the Hellenistic/Romanized Alexandrian in the first century CE. It provides a shoreline itinerary of the Red (Erythraean) Sea, starting at the port of Berenice. Beyond the Red Sea, the manuscript describes the coast of India as far as the Ganges River and the east coast of Africa (called Azania). The unknown author of the Periplus of the Erythraean Sea claims that Hippalus, a mariner, was knowledgeable about the "monsoon winds" that shorten the round-trip from India to the Red Sea. Also according to the manuscript, the Horn of Africa was called, "the Cape of Spices," and modern day Yemen was known as the "Frankincense Country."
- The Periplus Ponti Euxini, a description of trade routes along the coasts of the Black Sea, written by Arrian (in Greek Αρριανός) in the early second century CE.
- The Stadiasmus Maris Magni, it was written by an anonymous author and is dated to the second half of the third century AD.

== Rahnāmag ==
Persian sailors had long had their own sailing guide books, called Rahnāmag in Middle Persian (Rahnāmeh رهنامه in Modern Persian).

They listed the ports and coastal landmarks and distances along the shores.

The lost but much-cited sailing directions go back at least to the 12th century. Some described the Indian Ocean as "a hard sea to get out of" and warned of the "circumambient sea," with all return impossible.

== Tactic of naval combat ==
A periplus was also an ancient naval maneuver in which attacking triremes would outflank or encircle the defenders to attack them in the rear.

== See also ==
- List of Graeco-Roman geographers

== Bibliography ==
- Liu, Xinru (2010). The Silk Road in World History. New York: Oxford University Press. ISBN 978-0-195-33810-2.
