= Ora maritima =

Poem written by Avienius

The Sea Coast
- by Avienius
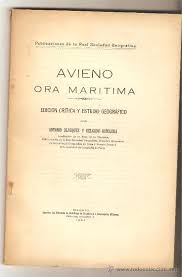
- Original title: Ora maritima
- Genre(s): Geography and travel
- Publication date: 4th century AD

Ora maritima ('The Sea Coast') is a poem written by Avienius. It has been claimed to contain borrowings from the Massaliote Periplus (perhaps dating to the 6th century BC). This poeticised periplus resulted in an anachronistic, non-factual account of the coastal regions of the known world. His editor André Berthelot demonstrated that Avienius' land-measurements were derived from Roman itineraries but inverted some sequences. Berthelot remarked of some names on the Hispanic coast: "The omission of Emporium, contrasting strangely with the names of Tarragon and Barcelona, may characterize the method of Avienius, who searches archaic documents and mingles his searches of them with his impressions as an official of the fourth century A.D." Ora maritima was a work for the reader rather than the traveller, where the fourth century present intrudes largely in the mention of cities at the time abandoned, like the legendary Ophiussa. More recent scholars have emended the too credulous reliance on Avienius' accuracy of his editor, the historian-archaeologist Adolf Schulten. Another ancient chief text cited by Avienius is the Periplus of Himilco, the description of a Punic expedition through the Atlantic coasts of Europe which took place at the same time of the circumnavigation of Africa by Hanno (c. 500 BC).

Ora maritima includes reference to the islands of Ierne and Albion, Ireland and Britain, whose inhabitants reputedly traded with the Oestrymnides of Brittany. The work was dedicated to Sextus Claudius Petronius Probus. It also mentions the presumably mythical city of Cypsela in the Catalonian coast.^{[Verse 521]}

The whole text derives from a single manuscript source, used for the editio princeps published at Venice in 1488.

== Content ==
Berthelot (1934) gives the following outline of the poem:

- Preamble: lines 1–79
- First part: Atlantic shore and Pillars of Hercules: lines 80–415
  - A. lines 80–145: Atlantic shore (to Spain)
  - B. lines 146–204: Atlantic shore of Spain
  - C. lines 205–415: Region of the Pillars of Hercules
- Second part: From the Pillars of Hercules to Marseilles: lines 416–703
  - A. lines 416–557: Mediterranean shore to the Pyrenees
  - B. lines 558–703: From the Pyrenees to Marseilles
