= Oestriminis =

Historic territories of Portugal and Galicia in the Iberian Peninsula

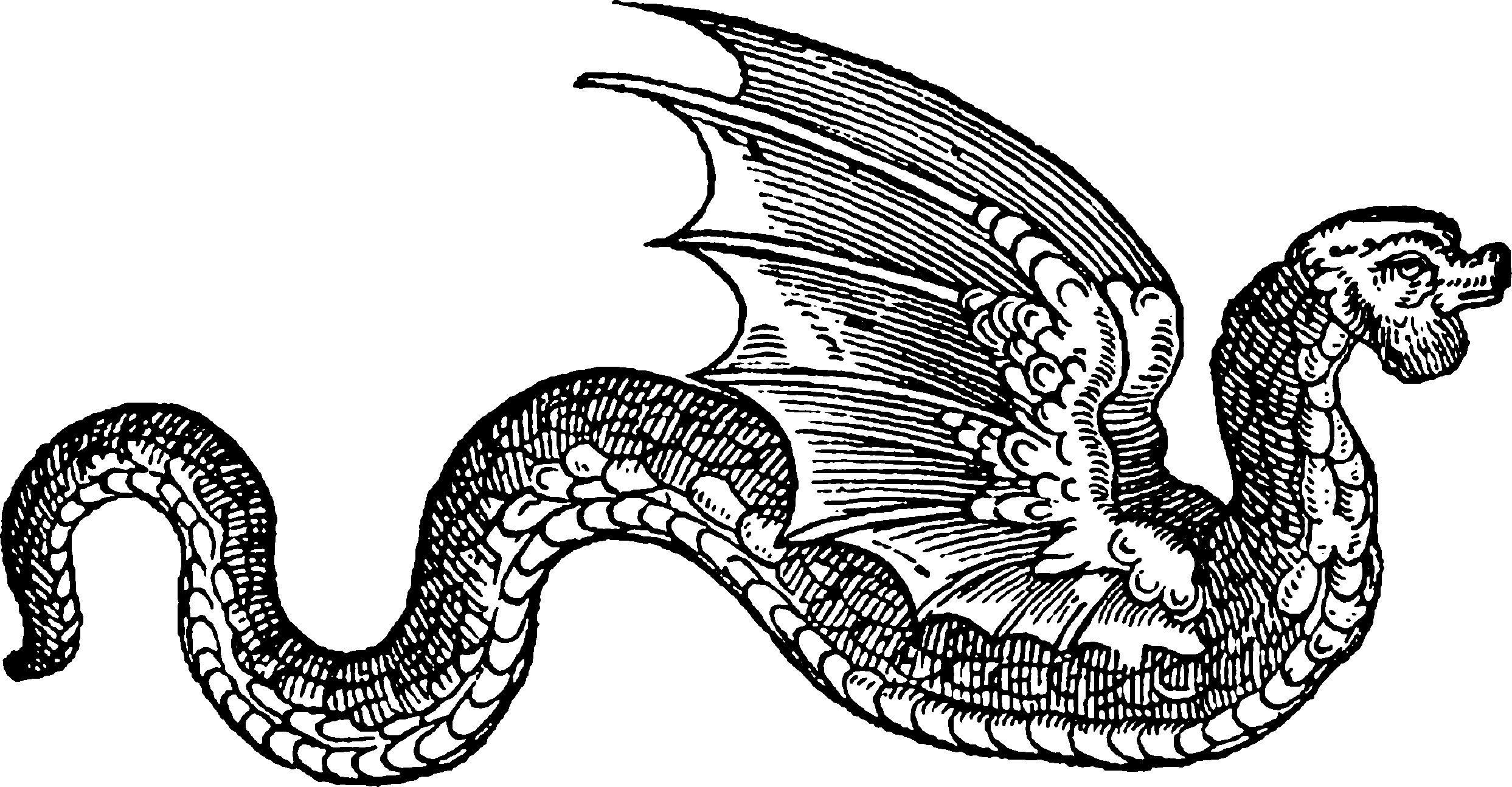
Antique print of an Amphiptere.

In the Latin poetry Avienus, Oestreminis was a name given to the territory of what is today modern Ushant, comparable to Finis terrae, the "end of the earth" from a Mediterranean perspective. Its inhabitants were named Oestrimni (later Osismii) from their location.

In Ora Maritima ("Seacoasts"), a poem inspired by a much earlier Greek mariners' periplus, Rufus Avienius Festus, Roman poet of the fourth century CE known for his pieces on geographical subjects, records that Oestriminis was peopled by the Oestrimni, a people who had lived there for a long time, and had to run away from their native lands after an invasion of serpents. His fanciful account has no archeological or historical application, but the poetical name has sometimes been ambitiously applied to popularized accounts of the Paleolithic inhabitants of Atlantic Iberia.

The expulsion of the Oestrimni, from Ora Maritima:

| Post illa rursum quae supra fati sumus, magnus patescit aequoris fusi sinus Ophiussam ad usque. rursum ab huius litore internum ad aequor, qua mare insinuare se dixi ante terris, quodque Sardum nuncupant, septem dierum tenditur pediti via. Ophiussa porro tanta panditur latus quantam iacere Pelopis audis insulam Graiorum in agro. haec dicta primo Oestrymnis est locos et arva Oestrymnicis habitantibus, post multa serpens effugavit incolas vacuamque glaebam nominis fecit sui. | Back after the places we spoke of above, there opens a great bay filled with water, all the way to Ophiussa. Back from the shore of this place, to the inland water, through which I said before that the sea insinuates itself across the land, and which they call Sardum, the journey lasts for seven days on foot. Ophiusa extends its side, being as large as you hear the Island of Pelops lying in the territory of the Greeks is. This land was originally called Oestrymnis by those who inhabited the Oestrymnian countryside and region, much later the serpent chased away the inhabitants and gave the now empty land its name. |

The "serpent people" of the semi-mythical Ophiussa in the far west are noted in ancient Greek sources.

== See also ==
https://pt.wikipedia.org/wiki/Rio_Struma
