= Massaliote Periplus =

Lost Phoenician merchant handbook

The Massaliote Periplus or Massiliote Periplus is a now-lost merchants' handbook, possibly dating from as early as the 6th century BC, describing the sea routes used by traders from Phoenicia and Tartessus in their journeys around Iron Age Europe.

Historian Adolf Schulten proposed it as a theoretical reconstruction of a sixth-century BC periplus, or sailing manual, and believed it had been versified in the lines of the Ora Maritima (The Maritime Shores), preserved by the Roman poet Avienus, who wrote down parts of it much later, during the 4th century AD. Schulten dated it to the 6th century BC. It describes an account of a sea voyage from Oestriminis, modern Pointe du Raz, to Greek colony Massalia, modern Marseille, along the western Mediterranean, made by Eutimenes of Masalia.

It also describes seaways running northwards from Cádiz in Spain along the coast of Atlantic Europe to Brittany, Ireland and Britain. The Periplus is the earliest work to describe the trade links between northern and southern Europe. That such a manual existed indicates the importance of these trade links. The trade in tin and other raw materials from the British Isles southwards is attested by archaeological evidence from this period and earlier and the riches to be won probably attracted numerous adventurers to explore and exploit the Atlantic coasts.

Pytheas of Massilia described a similar expedition in more detail a few centuries later, around 325 BC.
