= Ophiussa =

Historical region of Portugal

Ophiussa, also spelled Ophiusa, is the ancient name given by the ancient Greeks to what is now Portuguese territory near the mouth of the river Tagus. It means Land of Serpents.

== The expulsion of the Oestrimni ==
The 4th century Roman poet Rufius Festus Avienius, writing on geographical subjects in Ora Maritima ("Seacoasts"), a document inspired by a Greek mariners' Periplus, related that the Oestriminis (Extreme West in Latin) was peopled by the Oestrimni, a people who had been living there for a long time; they had to flee their homeland after an invasion of serpents. These people could be linked to the Saephe (Saefs) or Ophis ("People of the Serpents") and the Dragani ("People of the Dragons"), who came to those lands and built the territorial entity the Greeks termed Ophiussa.

The expulsion of the Oestrimni, from Ora Maritima:

Post illa rursum quae supra fati sumus, magnus patescit aequoris fusi sinus Ophiussam ad usque. rursum ab huius litore internum ad aequor, qua mare insinuare se dixi ante terris, quodque Sardum nuncupant, septem dierum tenditur pediti via. Ophiussa porro tanta panditur latus quantam iacere Pelopis audis insulam Graiorum in agro. haec dicta primo Oestrymnis est locos et arva Oestrymnicis habitantibus, post multa serpens effugavit incolas vacuamque glaebam nominis fecit sui.	Back after the places we spoke of above, there opens a great bay filled with water, all the way to Ophiussa. Back from the shore of this place, to the inland water, through which I said before that the sea insinuates itself through the land, and which they call Sardum, the journey extends for seven days on foot. Ophiusa extends its side, being as large as you hear the Island of Pelops lying in the territory of the Greeks is. This land was originally called Oestrymnis by those who inhabited the Oestrymnian countryside and region, much later the serpent chased away the inhabitants and gave the now empty land its name.

The "serpent people" of the semi-mythical Ophiussa in the far west are noted in ancient Greek sources.

== Land of the Ophi ==
The Ophi people lived mainly in the inland mountains of Northern Portugal (and Galicia). Others say they lived mainly by the estuaries of the rivers Douro and Tagus. The Ophi worshiped serpents, hence Land of Serpents. There have surfaced a few archeological findings that could be related to this people or culture. Some believe that the dragon sometimes represented as a griffin, from the original Winged Serpent, or Wyvern (the traditional Portuguese Serpe Real), old crest of the crown of the Kings of Portugal and later of the Emperors of Brazil, is linked to local people or to the Celts who had previously invaded the area and could also have been the influence for the Ophi cult.

== Ophi legend ==
A legend relates that on the summer solstice a maiden-serpent, a chthonic goddess, reveals hidden treasures to people journeying through forests. This maiden would live in the city of Porto. Festivities related to this goddess occurred during the solstice. During the rest of the year, she would change into a snake living under or among rocks, and shepherds would set aside some milk from their flocks as an offering to her.

== See also ==
- Avienius
- Cuco
- History of Portugal
- Lusitania
- Lusitanian mythology
- Sepharad
- Timeline of Portuguese history
