= Avienius =

Roman poet

Postumius Rufius Festus Avienius (or Avienus) was a Latin writer of the 4th century AD. He was a native of Volsinii in Etruria, from the distinguished family of the Rufii Festi.

Avienius is not identical with the historian Festus.

== Background ==
Avienius made a free translation into Latin of Aratus' didactic poem Phaenomena. He also took a popular Greek poem in hexameters, Periegesis, briefly delimiting the habitable world from the perspective of Alexandria, written by Dionysius Periegetes in a terse and elegant style that was easy to memorize for students, and translated it into an archaising Latin as his Descriptio orbis terrae ("Description of the World's Lands"). Only Book I survives, with an unsteady grasp of actual geography and some far-fetched etymologies: see Ophiussa.

He wrote Ora Maritima, a poem claimed to contain borrowings from the 6th-century BC Massiliote Periplus. Avienius also served as governor of Achaia and Africa.

According to legend, when asked what he did in the country, he answered Prandeo, poto, cano, ludo, lavo, caeno, quiesco:

I dine, drink, sing, play, bathe, sup, rest.

However this quote is a misattribution and likely comes from the works of Martial.

== Editions ==
- A. Berthelot: Ora maritima. Paris 1934. (text of reference)
- J. P. Murphy: Ora maritima or Description of the seacoast. (Chicago) 1977.
- J. Soubiran: Aviénus: Les Phénomènes d'Aratos. CUF, Paris 1981. (text of reference)
- D. Stichtenoth: Ora maritima, lateinisch und deutsch. Darmstadt 1968. (the Latin text is that of the editio princeps of 1488 and is better not cited)
- P. van de Woestijne: Descriptio orbis terrae. Brugge 1961. (text of reference)

Commentaries, monographs and articles

- F. Bellandi, E. Berti und M. Ciappi: "Iustissima Virgo": Il mito della Vergine in Germanico e in Avieno (saggio di commento a Germanico Arati Phaen. 96 - 139 e Avieno Arati Phaen. 273 - 352), Pisa 2001
- A. Cameron (1995). "Avienus or Avienius?" (PDF). Zeitschrift für Papyrologie und Epigraphik. 108: 252–262.
- Concordantia in Rufium Festum Avienum. Curavit Manfred WACHT. G. Olms Verlag 1995
- M. Fiedler: Kommentar zu V. 367-746 von Aviens Neugestaltung der Phainomena Arats. Stuttgart Saur 2004
- C. Ihlemann: De Avieni in vertendis Arateis arte et ratione. Diss. Göttingen 1909
- H. Kühne: De arte grammatica Rufi Festi Avieni. Essen 1905
- K. Smolak: Postumius Rufius Festus Avienus. In: Handbuch der lateinischen Literatur der Antike, hrsg. von R. Herzog und P. L. Schmidt, Fünfter Band. Restauration und Erneuerung. Die lateinische Literatur von 284 bis 374 n. Chr., München 1989, S. 320-327
- D. Weber: Aviens Phaenomena, eine Arat-Bearbeitung aus der lateinischen Spätanike. Untersuchungen zu ausgewählten Partien. Dissertationen der Universität Wien 173, Wien 1986
- L. Willms Übersetzung, philologischer Kommentar und vergleichende Interpretation des Tierkreises in Aviens Phaenomena (Verse 1014 – 1325) AKAN-Einzelschriften – Antike Naturwissenschaften und ihre Rezeption, vol. 8. Trier WVT 2014
- P. van de Woestijne: De vroegste uitgaven van Avienus' Descriptio orbis terrae (1488-1515). 1959
- H. Zehnacker: D'Aratos à Aviénus: Astronomie et idéologie. Illinois Classical Studies 44 (1989), S. 317-329
