= Outline of Catalonia =

Nationality and autonomous community of Spain

The Flag of Catalonia (Senyera)

Government's emblem

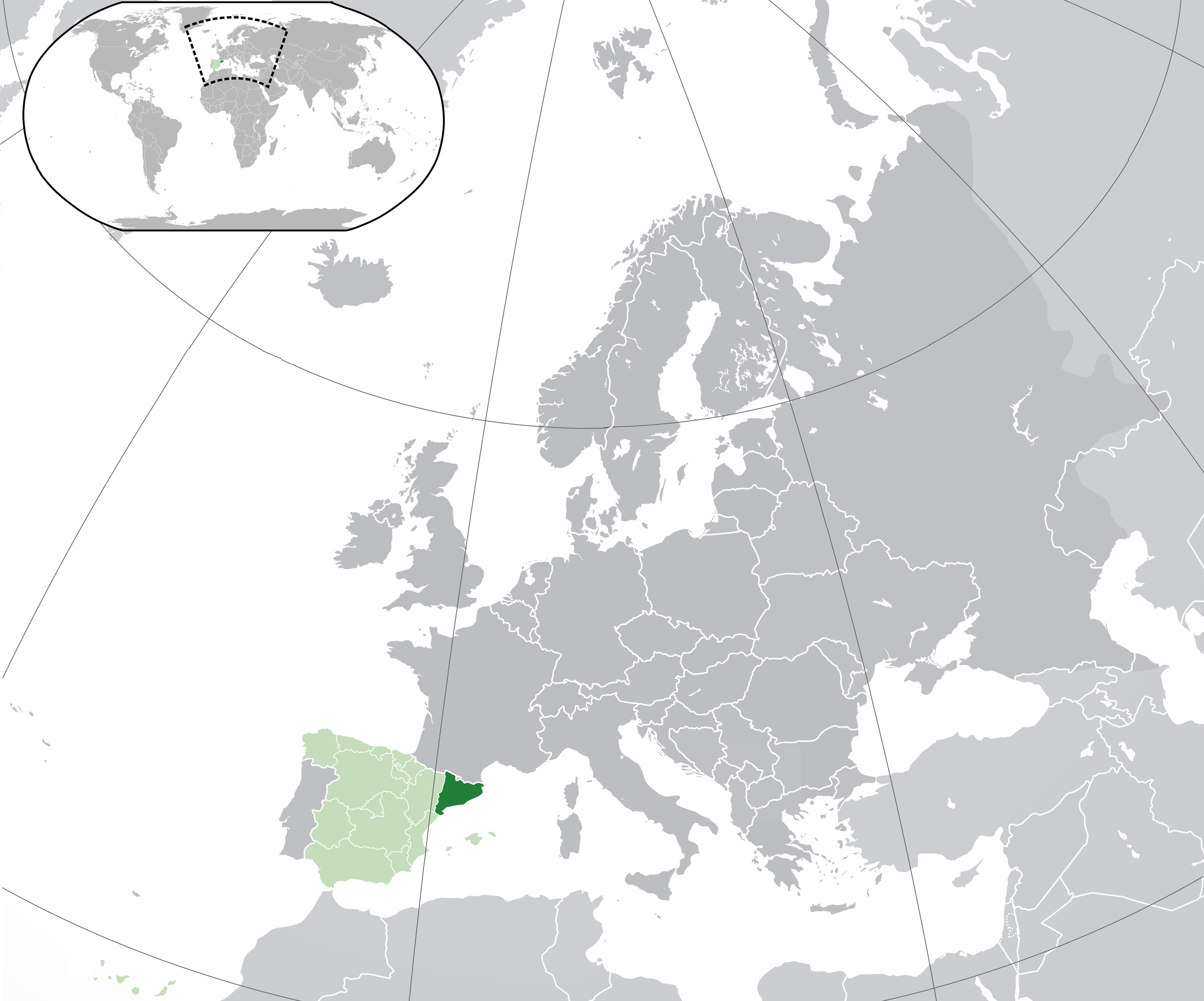
Location of Catalonia within Spain and Europe

The following outline is provided as an overview of and topical guide to Catalonia:

Catalonia – nationality and autonomous community of Spain, located on the northeastern corner of the Iberian Peninsula. Its capital and largest city is Barcelona. With 8 million inhabitants, it is the second most populous Spanish autonomous community, as well a major industrial and touristic powerhouse.

Once a state within the Crown of Aragon known as the Principality of Catalonia, it was integrated in to the Monarchy of Spain at the beginning of the 16th century. It lost its separate status, legal system and institutions in 1714, after Bourbon victory on the War of the Spanish Succession. Throughout the nineteenth century, it became an industrial center while workers' movements and Catalan nationalism appeared. The Second Spanish Republic (1931-1939) granted it self-government, defending the Republican cause during the Spanish Civil War (1936-1939), while experiencing a revolutionary process. The dictatorship of Francisco Franco abolished autonomy and repressed liberties and Catalan culture and language. After his death and the subsequent transition to democracy (1975-1981), self-government was restored.

== General reference ==
Flag map of Catalonia

- Pronunciation:
  - English: /ˌkætəˈloʊniə, -njə/
  - Catalan: [kətəˈluɲə] or [kataˈluɲa]
  - Occitan: [kataˈluɲɔ]
  - Spanish: [kataˈluɲa]
- Common English country name(s): Catalonia
- Official English country name(s): Catalonia
- Common endonym(s): Catalunya (ca), Cataluña (es)
- Official endonym(s): Catalunya (ca), Catalonha (oc), Cataluña (es),
- Adjectival(s): Catalan
- Demonym(s): Catalan
- Etymology of Catalonia
- ISO region code: CT
- Internet generic (cultural) top-level domain: .cat
- International direct dialing uses the prefix +34 (Spain). Local codes are 93- (for Barcelona) and 97- (rest of Catalonia [Girona, Lleida, Tarragona]) for fixed landlines, and 6 (Spain) for mobile cellphones

== Geography of Catalonia ==
Geography of Catalonia

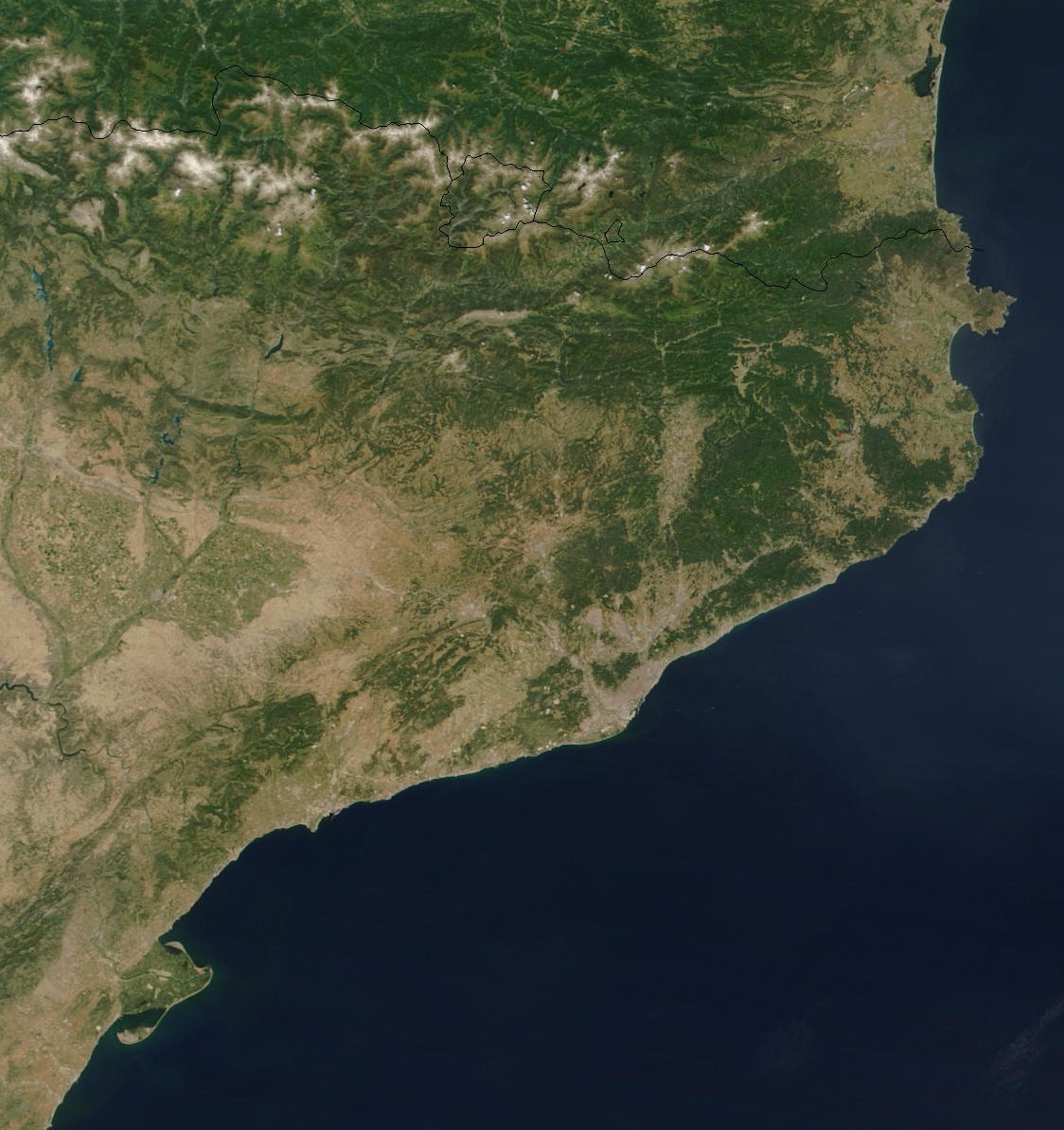
Satellite view of Catalonia

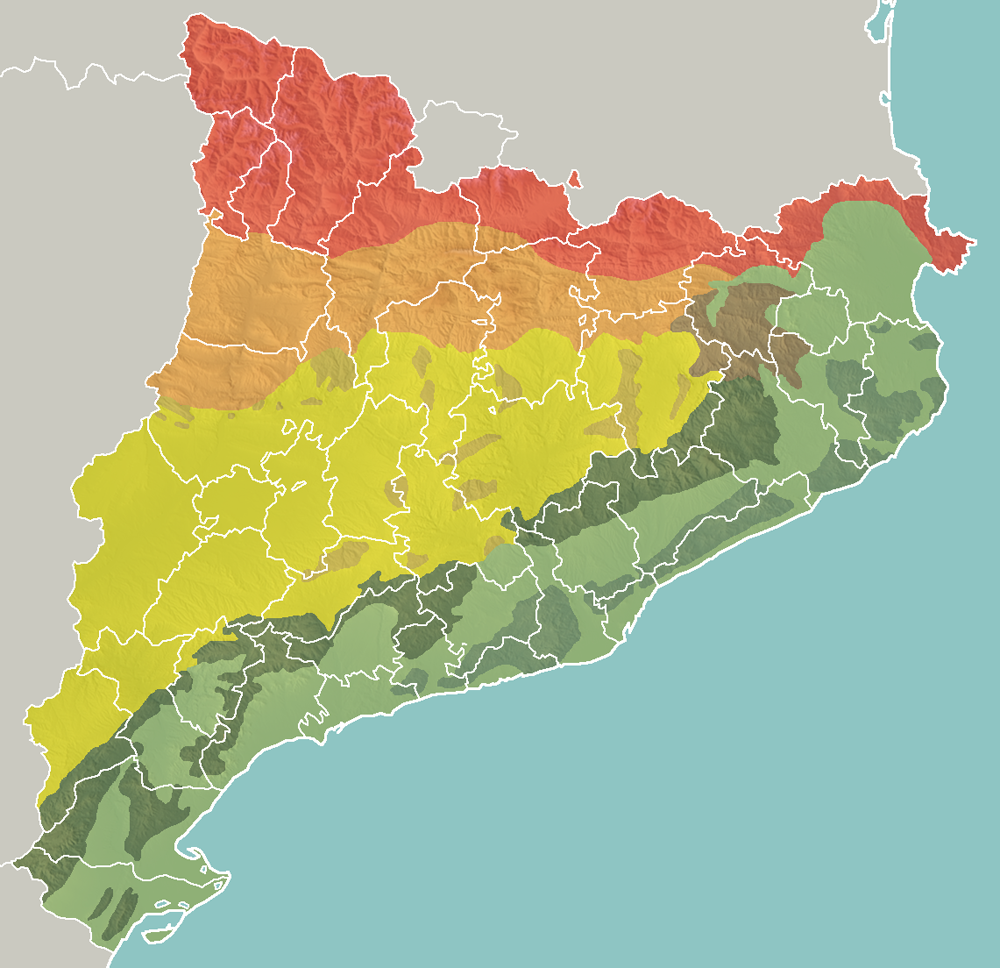
Geomorphologic map of Catalonia: Pyrenees; Pre-Pyrenees; Catalan Central Depression; Smaller mountain ranges of the Central Depression; Catalan Transversal Range; Catalan Pre-Coastal Range; Catalan Coastal Range; Catalan Coastal Depression and other coastal and pre-coastal plains

- Catalonia is...
  - a nationality, additionally self-defined as a nation
  - an autonomous community of Spain
- Location:
  - Northern Hemisphere, on the Prime meridian
  - Eurasia
    - Europe
      - Southern Europe and Western Europe
        - Iberian Peninsula
          - Spain
  - Time zone: Central European Time (UTC+01), Central European Summer Time (UTC+02)
  - Extreme points of Catalonia:
    - North: Tuc de Sacauba, Val d'Aran 42°51′N 0°42′E
    - South: Alcanar, Montsià 40°31′N 0°30′E
    - East: Cap de Creus, Alt Empordà 42°19′N 3°19′E
    - West: Tossal del Rei, Montsià 40°44′N 0°9′E
    - High: Pica d'Estats, Pallars Sobirà at 3,143 m (10,312 ft) 42°40′N 1°23′E
    - Low: Mediterranean coast at 0 m (0 ft)
  - Land boundaries:
    - Andorra
    - Occitanie (France)
    - Aragon (Spain)
    - Valencian Community (Spain)
  - Coastline: 580 km (Mediterranean Sea)
- Population of Catalonia: 7,565,603 (2012)
- Area of Catalonia: 32,114 km^{2}
- Atlas of Catalonia

=== Environment of Catalonia ===
- Climate of Catalonia
  - Mediterranean (Csa)
  - Continental Mediterranean (Csa) and Dry Mediterranean (Bsk)
  - Maritime (Cfb)
  - Alpine (ET/H)

==== Natural geographic features of Catalonia ====
- Mountains of Catalonia
- Rivers of Catalonia

=== Regions of Catalonia ===
==== Administrative divisions of Catalonia ====
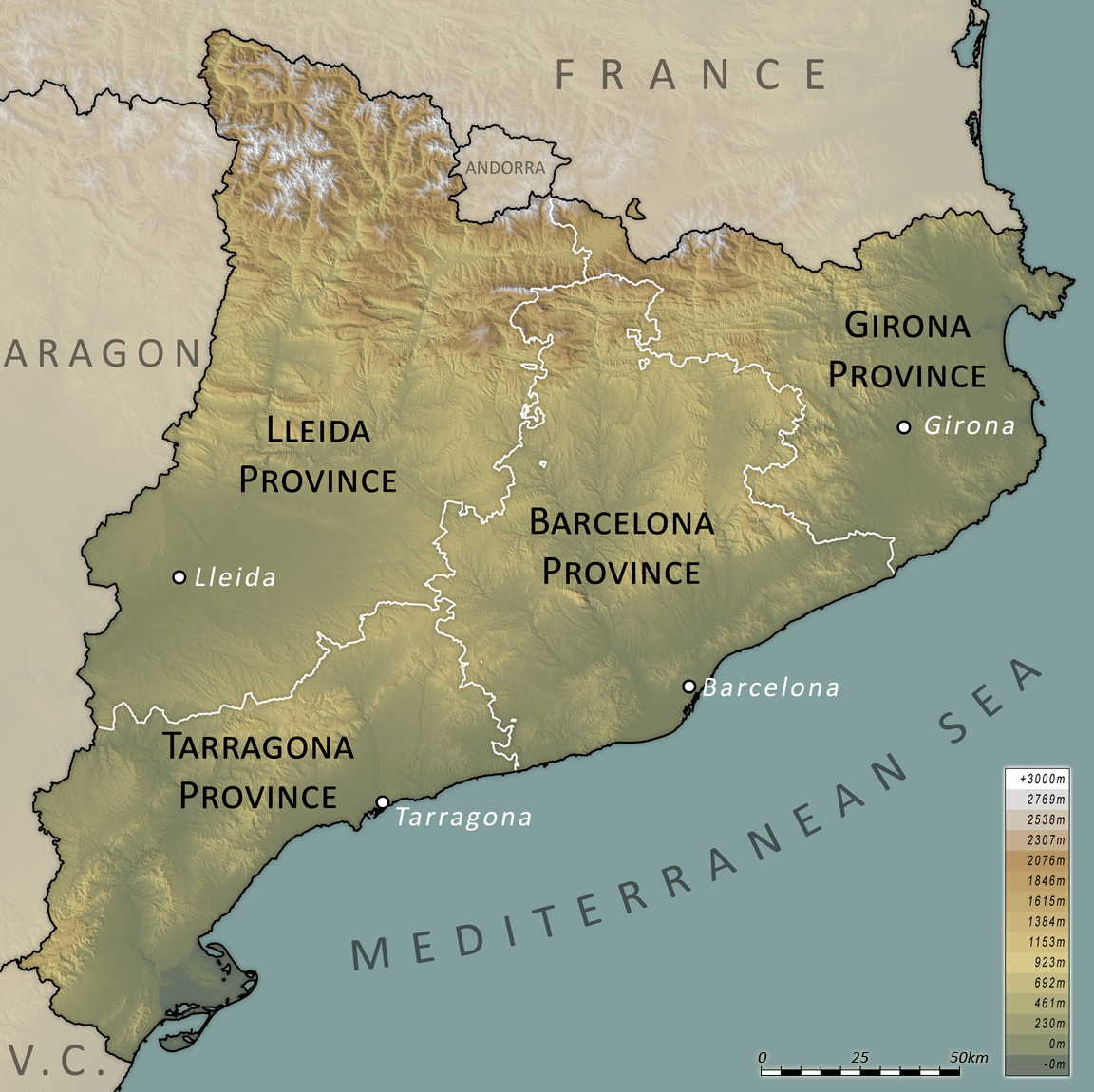
Provinces

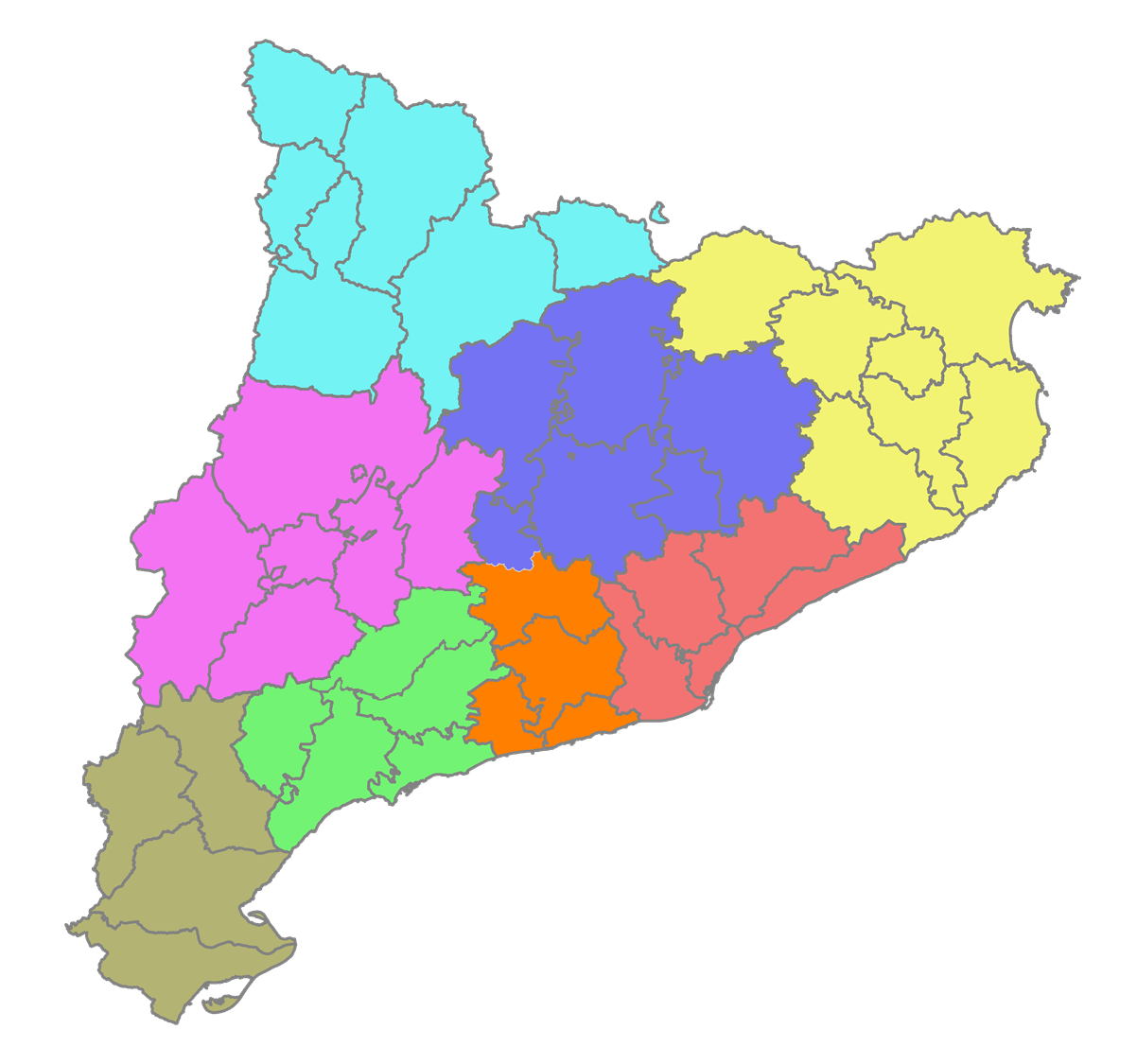
Àmbits funcionals territorials (AFT)

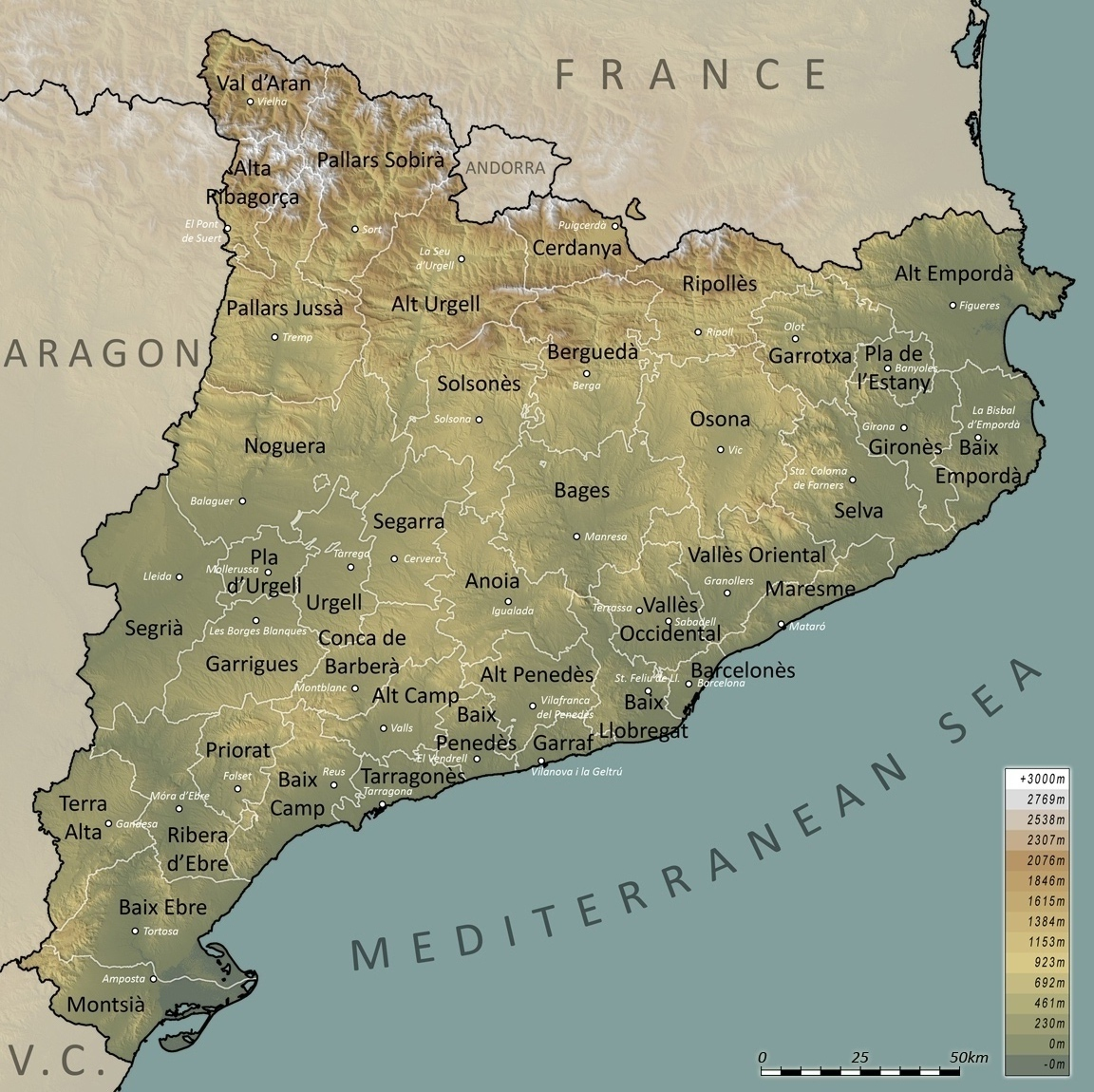
Comarques

Administrative divisions of Catalonia

- Provinces of Catalonia (4)
- Àmbits funcionals territorials of Catalonia (8)
  - Comarques of Catalonia (42)
    - Municipalities of Catalonia (947)

===== Provinces of Catalonia =====
- Barcelona
- Girona
- Lleida
- Tarragona

===== Àmbits funcionals territorials =====
- Alt Pirineu i Aran
- Àmbit Metropolità de Barcelona
- Camp de Tarragona
- Comarques Centrals
- Comarques Gironines
- Penedès
- Ponent
- Terres de l'Ebre

===== Comarques of Catalonia =====
- Alt Camp
- Alt Empordà
- Alt Penedès
- Alt Urgell
- Alta Ribagorça
- Anoia
- Aran (unique territorial entity)
- Bages
- Baix Camp
- Baix Ebre
- Baix Empordà
- Baix Llobregat
- Baix Penedès
- Barcelonès
- Berguedà
- Cerdanya
- Conca de Barberà
- Garraf
- Garrigues
- Garrotxa
- Gironès
- Lluçanès
- Maresme
- Moianès
- Montsià
- Noguera
- Osona
- Pallars Jussà
- Pallars Sobirà
- Pla de l'Estany
- Pla d'Urgell
- Priorat
- Ribera d'Ebre
- Ripollès
- Segarra
- Segrià
- Selva
- Solsonès
- Tarragonès
- Terra Alta
- Urgell
- Vallès Occidental
- Vallès Oriental

===== Municipalities of Catalonia =====
Municipalities of Catalonia (947)

- Capital of Catalonia: Barcelona – also the largest city
- List of metropolitan areas in Catalonia
  - Barcelona metropolitan area
  - Tarragona metropolitan area

=== Demography of Catalonia ===
Most populous municipalities :

- Barcelona 1,605,602
- L'Hospitalet de Llobregat 248,150
- Badalona 221,520
- Sabadell 200,545
- Terrassa 199,817
- Tarragona 131,158
- Lleida 125,677
- Santa Coloma de Gramenet 119,056
- Mataró 118,748
- Reus 101,767

== Government and politics of Catalonia ==
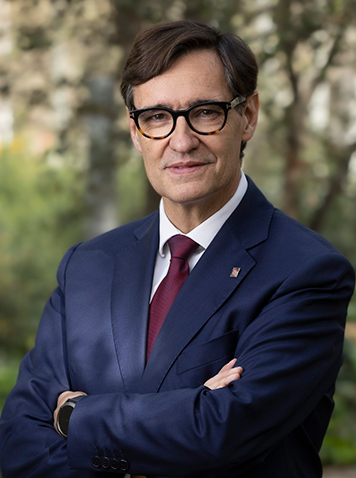
Salvador Illa, current President of the Generalitat of Catalonia

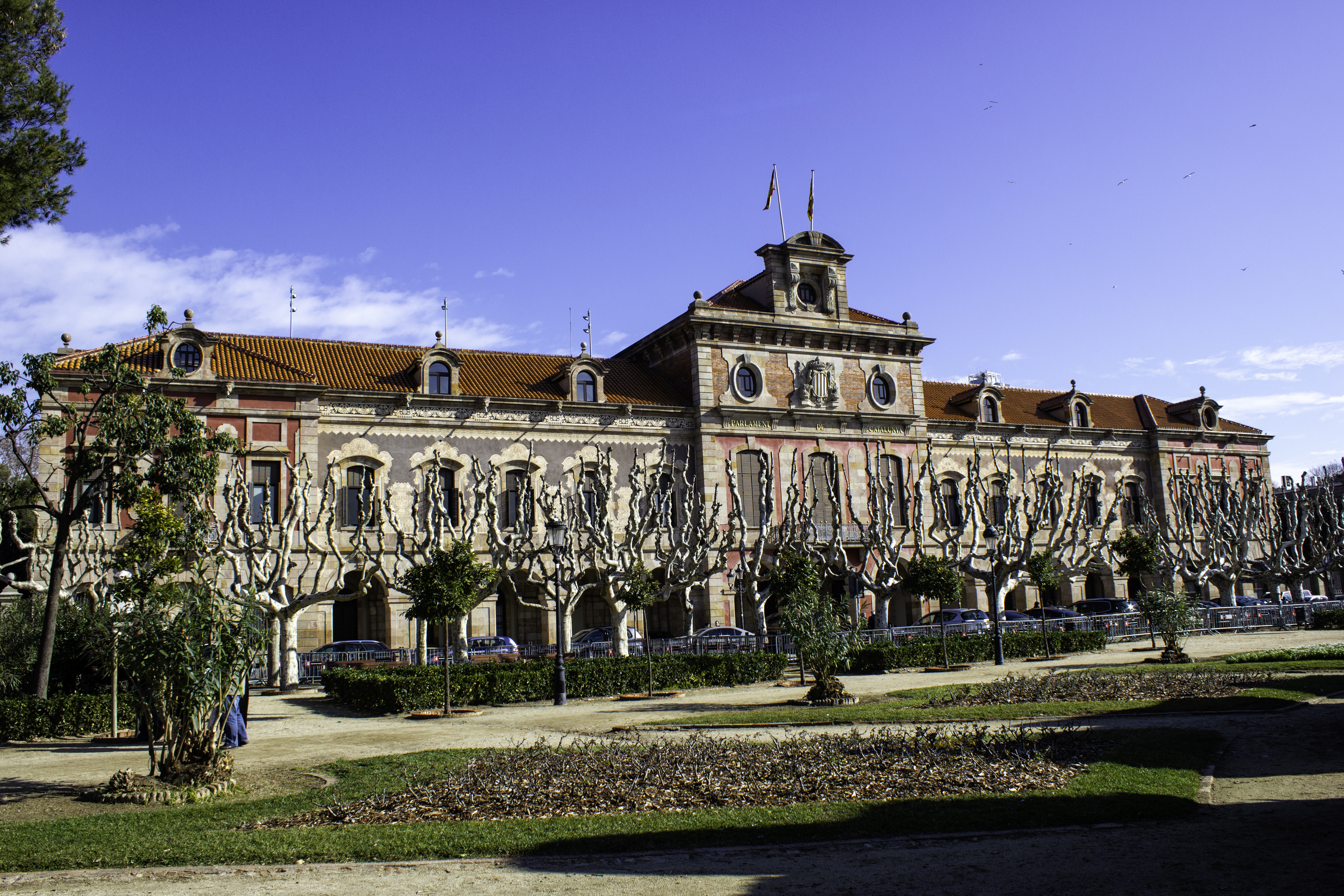
Palace of the Parliament of Catalonia, Barcelona

Government of Catalonia (Generalitat de Catalunya)

- Form of government: Devolved parliamentary legislature within a constitutional monarchy
- Capital: Barcelona

Politics of Catalonia

- Elections in Catalonia
  - 2024 Catalan parliamentary election
- Political parties in Catalonia
  - Major parties:
    - Partit dels Socialistes de Catalunya (Socialist's Party of Catalonia) — ruling political party
      - Units per Avançar (United to Advance)
    - Junts per Catalunya (Together for Catalonia)
      - Moviment d'Esquerres (Left Movement)
    - Esquerra Republicana de Catalunya (Republican Left of Catalonia)
    - Partit Popular Català (People's Party of Catalonia)
    - Vox
    - Catalunya en Comú (Catalonia in Common)
    - Candidatura d'Unitat Popular (Popular Unity Candidacy)
      - Endavant (Forward-Socialist Organization of National Liberation)
      - Poble Lliure (Free People)
- Queries on Catalonia independence
  - Catalan independence referendum, 2017
  - Institutional support for the queries on the independence of Catalonia

=== Branches of the government of Catalonia ===
==== Executive branch ====
Executive Council of Catalonia

- President of Catalonia (President de la Generalitat de Catalunya): Salvador Illa
  - Cabinet (Catalonia Government 2024 - term of office).
  - List of presidents of the Government of Catalonia
- List of vice presidents of Catalonia
- International relations of Catalonia
- Palace of the Generalitat of Catalonia – main headquarters of the Catalan Government located in Barcelona

==== Legislative branch ====
- Parliament of Catalonia (Parlament de Catalunya)
  - President of the Parliament of Catalonia (President del Parlament de Catalunya): Josep Rull
  - Board of the Parliament of Catalonia
  - Parliamentary groups of the Parliament of Catalonia

==== Other institutions ====
- Council of Statutarian Pledges (Consell de Garanties Estatutàries)
- Ombudsman (Síndic de Greuges): Esther Giménez-Salinas
- Syndicate of Accounts (Sindicatura de Comptes)
- Audiovisual Council of Catalonia (Consell de l'Audiovisual de Catalunya)

=== Spanish judiciary in Catalonia ===
- High Court of Justice of Catalonia (Tribunal Superior de Justícia de Catalunya, TSJC)

=== Law and order in Catalonia ===
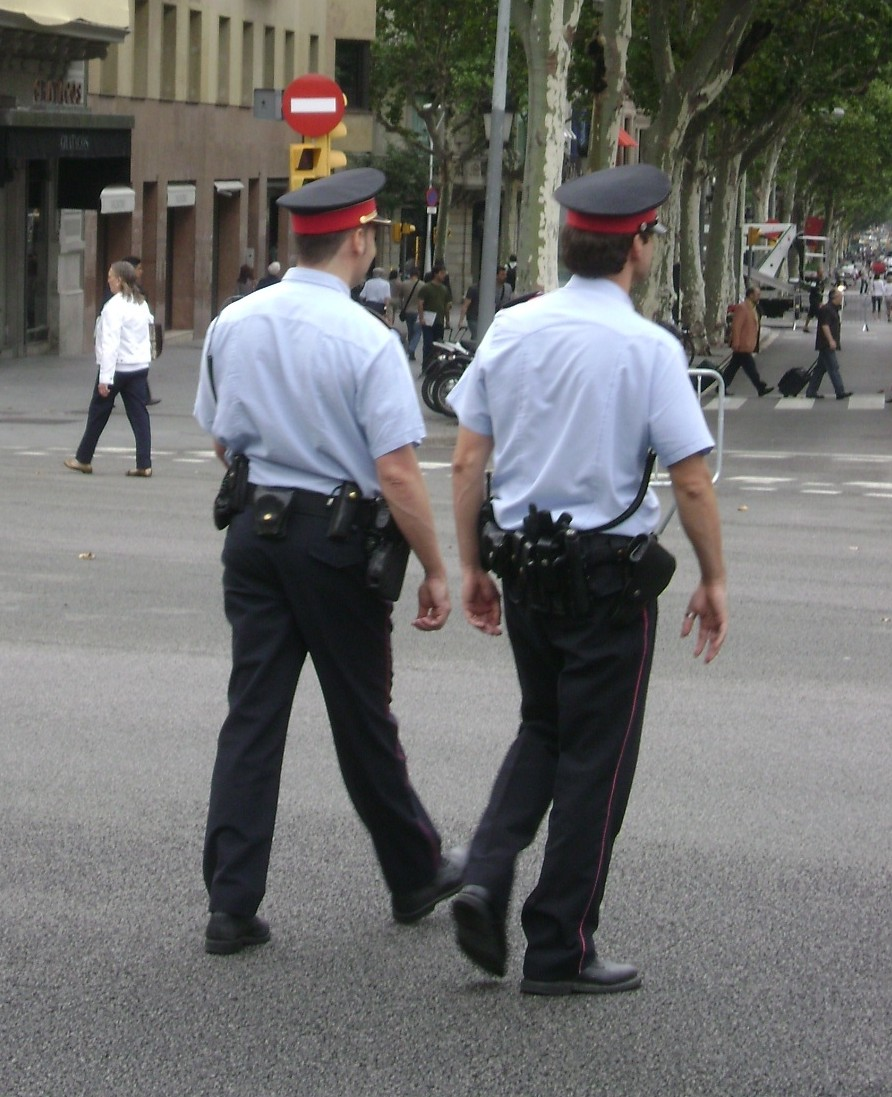
Mossos d'Esquadra patrolling

Law of Catalonia

- Statute of Autonomy of Catalonia
  - 2006 Catalan constitutional referendum
- Civil Code of Catalonia
- Capital punishment in Catalonia
- Criminal justice system of Catalonia
- Crime in Catalonia
  - Organized crime in Catalonia
  - Prostitution in Catalonia
- Human rights in Catalonia
  - Freedom of the press in Catalonia
  - Freedom of religion in Catalonia
  - LGBT rights in Catalonia
- Law enforcement in Catalonia
  - Mossos d'Esquadra (Police force of Catalonia)
  - Penal system of Catalonia

=== Local government in Catalonia ===
Local government of Catalonia

- Barcelona (Parliament of Catalonia constituency)
- Girona (Parliament of Catalonia constituency)
- Lleida (Parliament of Catalonia constituency)
- Tarragona (Parliament of Catalonia constituency)

== History of Catalonia ==
History of Catalonia

- Timeline of Catalan history
- Current events of Catalonia

=== By period ===
- Catalan counties
  - County of Barcelona
- Principality of Catalonia
- Catalan Republic
  - 1640-1641
  - 1931
  - 1934
- Commonwealth
- Autonomous Catalonia (1931–1939)
  - Statute of Autonomy of Catalonia of 1932
- Revolutionary Catalonia
- Francoist occupation
- Provisional government of Catalonia (1977-1980)
  - Statute of Autonomy of Catalonia of 1979
- Independence movement
  - Statute of Autonomy of Catalonia of 2006
  - Institutional support for the queries on the independence of Catalonia (2009)
  - White Paper on the National Transition of Catalonia (2014)
  - Declaration of the Initiation of the Process of Independence of Catalonia (2015)
  - Law on the Referendum on Self-determination of Catalonia
  - Trial of Catalonia independence leaders (2019)

=== By subject ===
- History of Catalan language
- Economic history of Catalonia
  - History of the cotton industry in Catalonia
- Military history of Catalonia
  - Sometent
  - Catalan navy
  - Army of Catalonia
  - People's Army of Catalonia
- Political history of Catalonia
  - List of viceroys of Catalonia
- History of telephone service in Catalonia

=== By municipalities ===
- Timeline of Barcelona
- Timeline of Lleida

== Culture of Catalonia ==
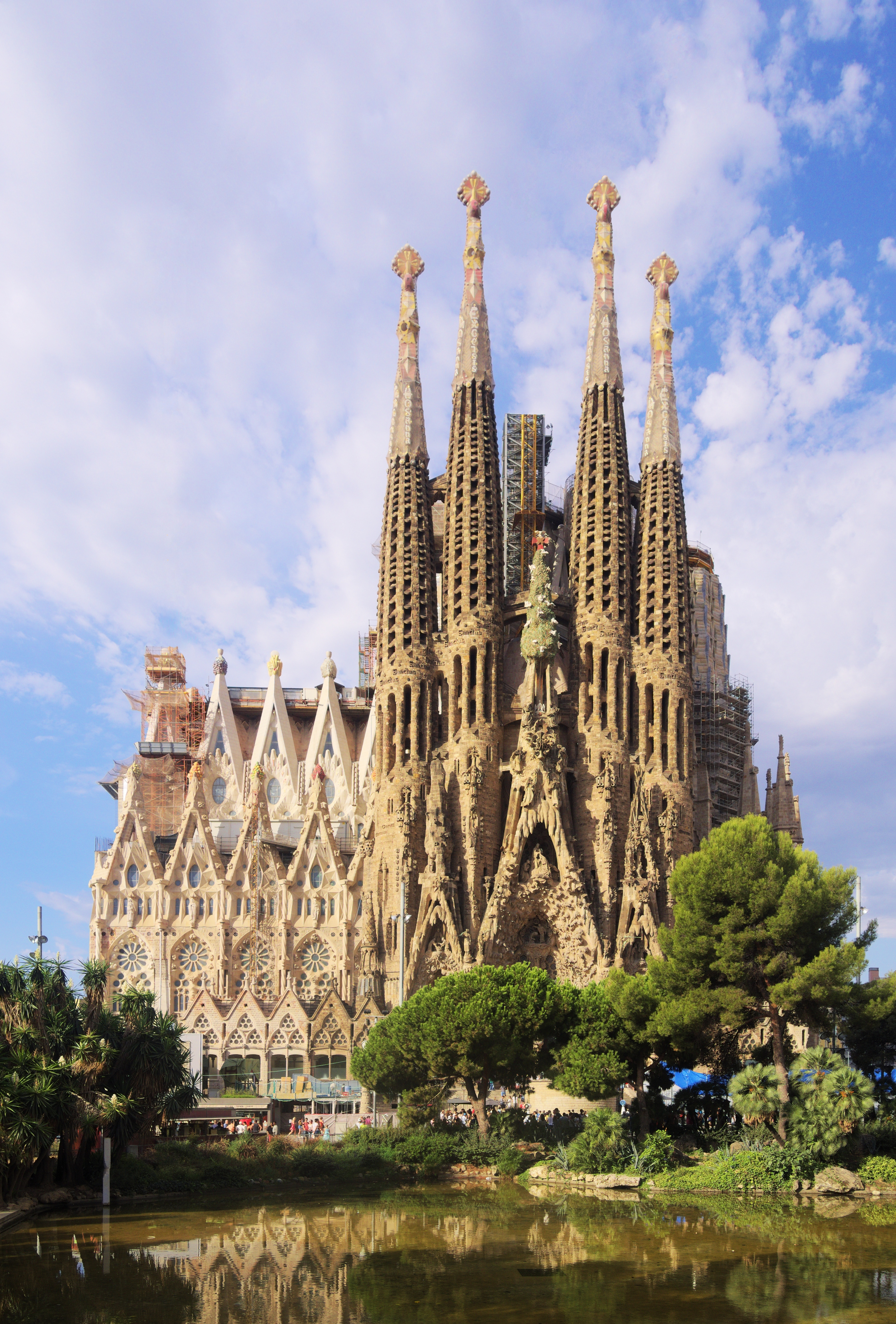
Sagrada Família, Barcelona

Culture of Catalonia

- Architecture of Catalonia
- Associations in Catalonia
  - Catalan Association for the Blind and Visually Impaired
- Cuisine of Catalonia
- Festivals in Catalonia
- Humour in Catalonia
- Libraries in Catalonia
  - Library of Catalonia
- Media in Catalonia
- Museums in Catalonia
  - National Art Museum of Catalonia
  - Archaeology Museum of Catalonia
  - Museum of the History of Catalonia
- National symbols of Catalonia
  - Coat of arms of Catalonia
  - Flag of Catalonia
  - National anthem of Catalonia
- Public holidays in Catalonia
  - National Day of Catalonia
  - Saint George's Day
  - Saint John's Eve
  - Saint Stephen's Day
- Religion in Catalonia
- Traditions of Catalonia
- Records of Catalonia
- World Heritage Sites in Catalonia

=== The arts in Catalonia ===
Catalan art

- Cinema of Catalonia
- Catalan comedy
- Literature of Catalonia
- Music of Catalonia
  - Barcelona Symphony Orchestra and National Orchestra of Catalonia
- Television in Catalonia
- Theatre in Catalonia

=== Languages of Catalonia ===
Languages in Catalonia

- Official languages:
  - Catalan language
  - Aranese dialect of Gascon (Occitan language)
  - Spanish language
  - Catalan sign language

=== People of Catalonia ===
Ethno-linguistic groups of Catalonia:

- Catalan people
- Occitan people
- Spanish people
- Ethnic minorities in Catalonia
  - Jews of Catalonia

=== Sports in Catalonia ===
Sport in Catalonia

- Football in Catalonia
  - Catalonia national football team
  - Barça
  - RCD Espanyol
  - Girona FC
- Basketball in Catalonia
- Rugby in Catalonia
- Hockey in Catalonia
  - Fresno Case

== Economy and infrastructure of Catalonia ==
Economy of Catalonia

- Four Motors for Europe
- List of Spanish autonomous communities by GRP
- Currency of Spain (thence Catalonia): Euro (sign: €; code: EUR)
- Transport in Catalonia
  - Rail transport in Catalonia
  - List of primary highways in Catalonia
  - List of airports in Catalonia

== Education in Catalonia ==
Education in Catalonia

- Education in Catalan
- Higher education in Catalonia
  - Universities of Catalonia
    - University of Barcelona
    - Autonomous University of Barcelona
    - University of Lleida
    - University of Rovira i Virgili
    - University of Girona
    - Open University of Catalonia
    - Polytechnic University of Catalonia (BarcelonaTech)
    - University of Vic - Central University of Catalonia
  - Colleges of Catalonia

== See also ==
Catalonia

- List of Catalonia-related topics
- List of international rankings
- Outline of geography
- Outline of Europe
