= Flag of Barcelona =

City flag in Catalonia, Spain

- Proportion: 2:3
- Adopted: 14th century, 2004 (current version)

The flag of Barcelona (Catalan and Spanish: Bandera de Barcelona) is the official municipal flag of Barcelona, Catalonia, Spain. It is derived from the city's coat of arms and combines the Cross of Saint George, associated with Saint George (Catalan: Sant Jordi), one of the city's patron saints, with the four red pales of the Senyera, the historic emblem of the Counts of Barcelona and later of the Crown of Aragon. Although its origins date back to the 14th century, in its present form it has been official since 2004.

== Design ==
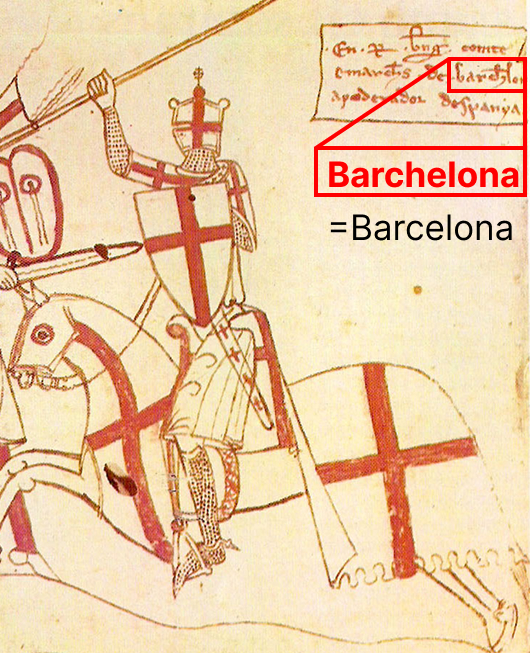
Ramón Berenguer, Count of Barcelona, with his personal arms (Saint George's Cross)

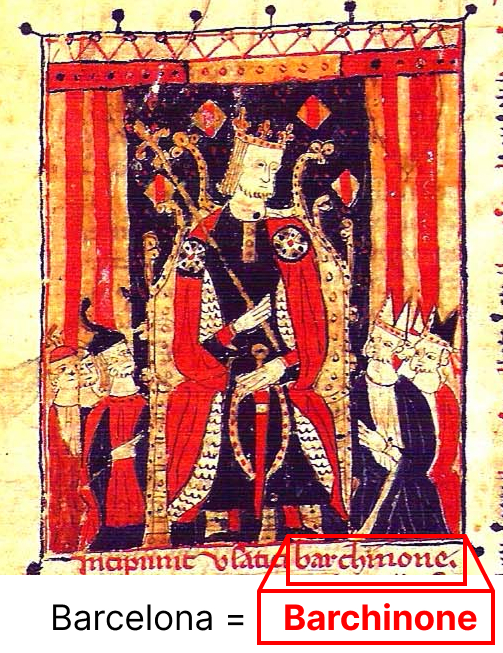
Manuscript of the Usages of Barcelona from circa 1173, showing Ramon Berenguer I of Barcelona alongside the royal senyera

The flag is quartered, joining the Saint George's Cross (a field Argent with a cross Gules), patron saint of the House of Barcelona and the arms of the Archdiocese of Barcelona, and the Royal Arms of Aragon, the Four Bars which bear four red paletts on gold background, depicts the emblems of the Kings of Aragon and Counts of Barcelona since 1137 when Aragon and the County of Barcelona merged by dynastic union by the marriage of Raymond Berengar IV of Barcelona and Petronila of Aragon.

=== Saint George's Cross ===
The first instance of a cross is found in a seal of 1288. The Saint George's Cross is shown on a 13th-century mural of the Tinell Hall, depicting by Barcelonan or Catalan soldiers. The Neighborly host ordinances of 1395 ordered: «Than for the city councillors, the present be made a long side banner which has the sign of Saint George, containing a red cross on a white field, that is badge of the city».

=== Senyera ===
The Aragonese Royal Standard (and County of Barcelona, the four red stripes on a yellow field) used alongside the banner of the city worn by Barcelonan soldiers and later joining them in a quartering first depicted on the heraldic sign and later on the banner.

Symbols of the flag of Barcelona

Saint George's Cross

Saint George's Cross, emblem of the deputation of the General of Catalonia (the Generalitat) which is seat was in Barcelona.

Senyera

Coat of arms of Ramon Berenguer IV of Barcelona, Count of Barcelona and first King of the Crown of Aragon.

== History ==
=== 13th Century ===
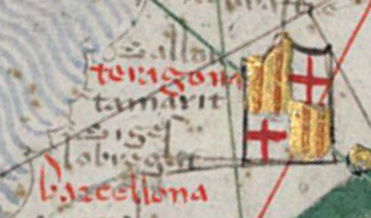
Flag of Barcelona shown in the Catalan Atlas, c. 1375

The origins of Barcelona's flag lie in the city's medieval heraldry. The quartered coat of arms developed between the thirteenth and fourteenth centuries and became the principal civic emblem of Barcelona. The earliest known depiction of Barcelona's municipal banner appears in the Catalan Atlas of 1375.

Moreover, in the year 1395 the Neighborly host ordinances (Catalan: Ordinacions de la host veïnal) are published which regulated "when it is necessary for the Flag of the City to go out for the defense of its privileges and preeminences". By virtue of these ordinances, it is recorded that in the year 1406 "a banner or standard was made with the sign of Saint George, that is, a red cross on a white field, under which banner, by ordinance of the Council of One Hundred, the honored Citizens of Barcelona had to go to accompany the flag of the city in every local militia". Similar banners appear in fifteenth-century municipal manuscripts (Dietaris de la Ciutat), portolan charts, and later heraldic armorials.

=== 16th Century and Saint Eulalia's Flag ===
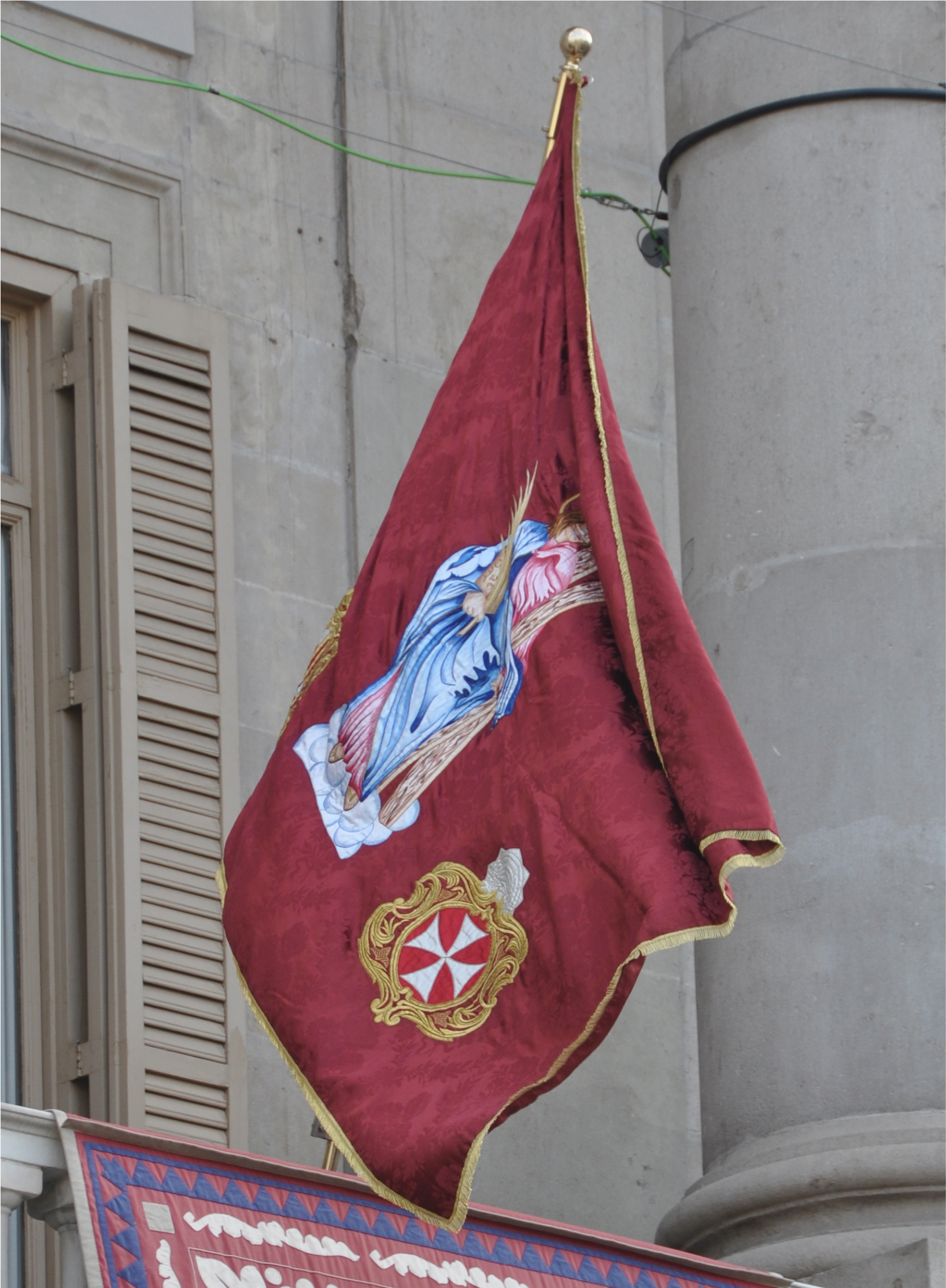
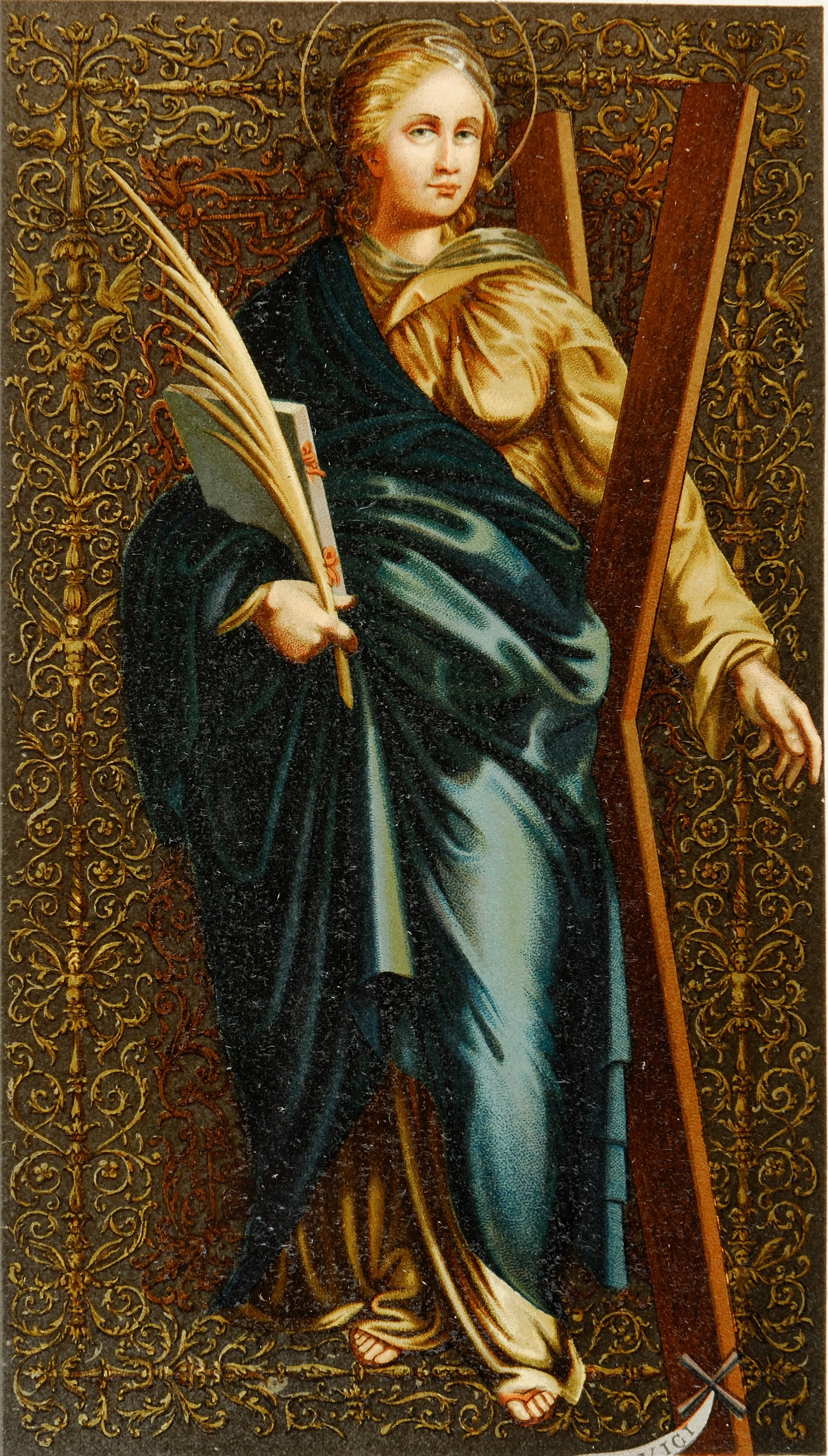
On the left, the flag of Saint Eulalia seen in the balcony of the Barcelona City Hall for the festivity of Saint Eulalia, on the right a historic 15th century flag of Saint Eulalia conserved in the History Museum of Barcelona.

Throughout the late Middle Ages and Early modern period, Barcelona's principal civic standard was the Banner of Saint Eulalia (Catalan: Bandera de Santa Eulàlia), named after Saint Eulalia of Barcelona, the city's co-patron saint. Carried by the Consell de Cent (Council of One Hundred), it functioned as both the ceremonial banner of the municipal government and the city's war standard. According to medieval custom, its unfurling signified that Barcelona had entered a state of military mobilization, obliging the city's citizens to assemble in its defense.

The banner, whose design evolved over time, generally incorporated the quartered arms of Barcelona (civic power) and the arms of the bishop of barcelona (religious power). It was borne in civic processions, military campaigns, and other solemn occasions, becoming one of the foremost symbols of Barcelona's municipal liberties and institutions.

The Banner of Saint Eulalia remained in official use until the suppression of Barcelona's civic institutions following the city's surrender during the War of the Spanish Succession in 1714. The subsequent Nueva Planta decrees abolished the Consell de Cent, ending the banner's official role.

=== 20th Century ===
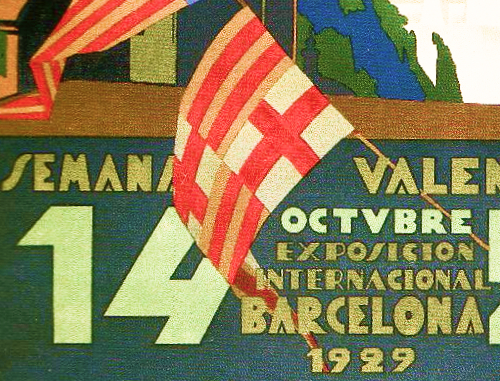
Flag of Barcelona with two red horizontal bars as seen in a poster for the 1929 Barcelona International Exposition.

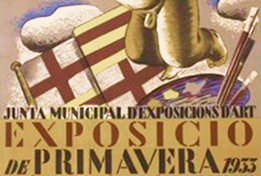
As seen in the 1933 poster for the Spring Exposition

On 4 May 1906, the City Council of Barcelona formally re-adopted the historical flag. The design reflected the growing tendency among Spanish municipalities during the late nineteenth and early twentieth centuries to standardize their heraldic and vexillological symbols while preserving their historical identity.

Following the Spanish Civil War, the public use of many Catalan symbols was restricted during the dictatorship of Francisco Franco. Although the city's heraldic arms continued to be used in an official capacity, the traditional municipal flag was largely absent from public display.

After the restoration of democracy, Barcelona reintroduced its historic flag. In 1984, the city council adopted a revised version featuring brighter colours and a modified arrangement of the Senyera's red pales, corresponding to the contemporary municipal coat of arms.

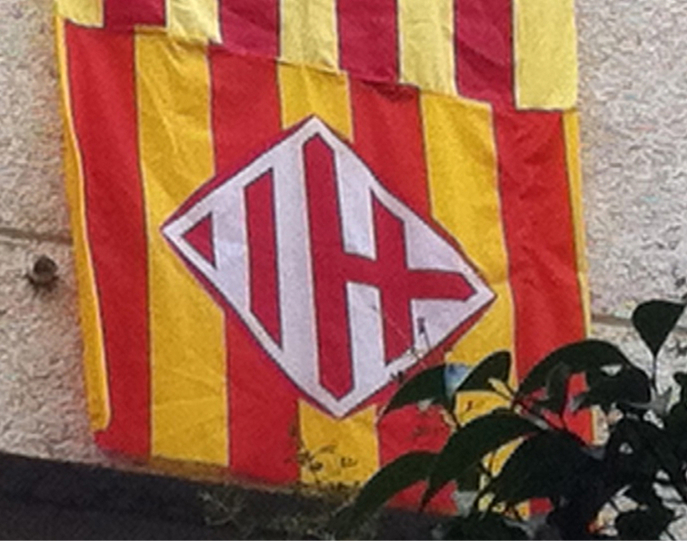
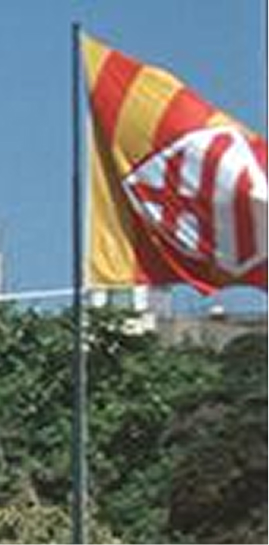
The short-lived 1996 design seen on a balcony (left) and at the Barcelona Pavilion (right)

In 1996, the City Council approved a new municipal flag incorporating the city's official logo superimposed over a field of vertical Senyera stripes. The redesign formed part of a broader programme to modernize the city's visual identity. It received support from some political groups but was criticized by historians and vexillologists, particularly the Associació Catalana de Vexil·lologia, who argued that it departed from established heraldic and vexillological principles.

=== Present Day ===
As a result of these criticisms, the city council adopted new regulations in 2004 restoring the traditional 1906 design as the official municipal flag. Although the historic flag is the legally recognized flag of Barcelona, both the 1906 and 1996 designs continue to be used in different municipal contexts.

Timeline of the flag of Barcelona

| circa 1375 - 1714 | 1588 - 1714 | 1906 | 1996 | 2004 |

== See also ==
- Coat of arms of Barcelona
- Senyera
- Flag of Spain
- List of Spanish flags

== External sources ==
- Legislation making official the current flag (in Catalan)
- Flags of the World: Municipality of Barcelona (Catalonia, Spain)
- Barcelona Municipality
- Associació Catalana de Vexil·lologia (in Catalan)
