= Coat of arms of Barcelona =

Coat of arms of the City Barcelona

Versions
- Isotype

- Logotype
- Armiger: City Council of Barcelona
- Adopted: 1329
- Crest: Spanish Royal Crown
- Shield: Quarterly: 1 and 4 the Saint George's Cross, 2 and 3 the Royal Bars of Aragon

The coat of arms of Barcelona is the official emblem of the City Council of Barcelona, the capital of Catalonia, has its origin in the Middle Ages, these arms were first documented in 1329. The Government of Catalonia conferred the coat of arms and the flag as official symbols of the municipality in 2004. It has an escutcheon in lozenge which is commonly used in municipal coats of arms of cities in Catalonia. Currently the City Council of Barcelona also uses an isotype based on the heraldry of the city.

The blazon of the arms is:

Quarterly, first and fourth Argent, a full cross Gules, second and third Or, with four paletts Gules; for a Crest, a royal crown (with half-arches, monde, and cross).

— Official Gazette of Catalonia - DOGC, no. 4114

== History ==
The heraldry of the city joining the Saint George's Cross (a field Argent with a cross Gules), patron saint of the House of Barcelona and the arms of the Archdiocese of Barcelona, and the Royal Arms of Aragon, the Four Bars which bear four red paletts on gold background, depicts the emblems of the Kings of Aragon and Counts of Barcelona since 1137 when Aragon and the County of Barcelona merged by dynastic union by the marriage of Raymond Berengar IV of Barcelona and Petronila of Aragon. Among other territories of the former Crown of Aragon, the coats of arms of Catalonia, Aragon, Valencia and the Balearic Islands include the Four Bars.

=== Saint George's Cross ===
The first instance of a cross is found in a seal of 1288. The Saint George's Cross is shown on a 13th-century mural of the Tinell Hall, depicting by Barcelonan or Catalan soldiers. The Neighborly host ordinances of 1395 ordered: «Than for the city councillors, the present be made a long side banner which has the sign of Saint George, containing a red cross on a white field, that is badge of the city». Thus the cross seem to have been used as a distinguishing and official of Barcelonan citizens, or perhaps slightly earlier. The Aragonese Royal Standard (and County of Barcelona, the four red stripes on a yellow field) used alongside the banner of the city worn by Barcelonan soldiers and later joining them in a quartering first depicted on the heraldic sign and later on the banner. Quartering in is a method of joining several different coats of arms together in one shield to avoid conflict with otherwise similar coats of arms but quarters are numbered from the dexter chief (the corner nearest to the right shoulder of a man standing behind the shield), proceeding across the top row, and then across the next row and so on. The arms of the citizens were placed in the most honourable quarters (the first and fourth) because their representative traditionally forced the king to negotiate his policies. In 1359 the Generalitat of Catalonia adopted the Saint George's Cross as flag and sign «by being the ancient arms of the County of Barcelona».

=== Number of bars ===
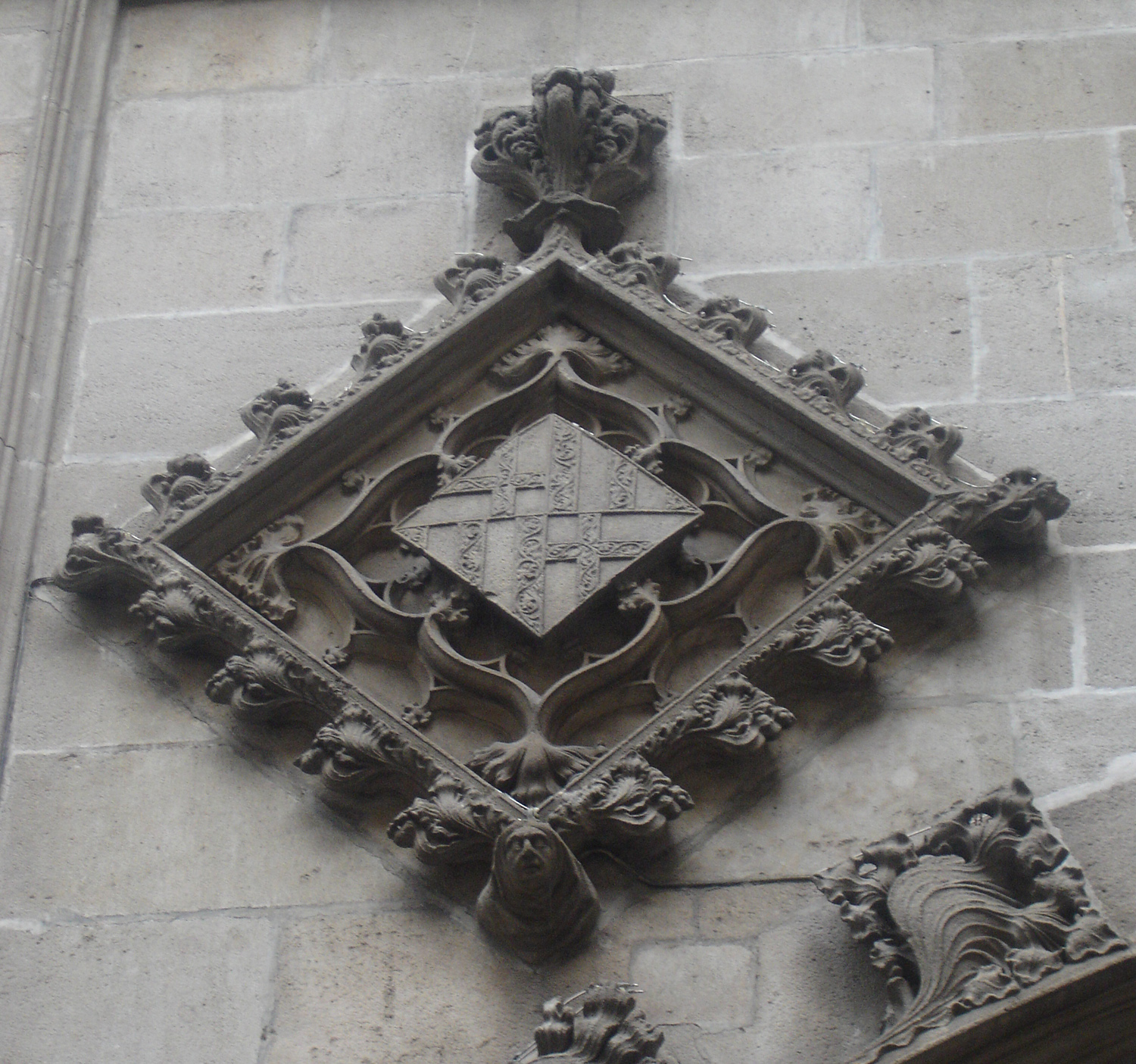
Version of the arms of Barcelona with two bars on the ancient main façade of the City Hall

Before the royal grant of 1345 that set the number of pallets to four, there were periods when four pallets alternated with three or two. Later, the shield charged with two bars was recurrent source of discussion as a proper variant of Barcelona. In 1996 was adopted a monochrome logotype as official emblem of Barcelona, a rhombus or lozenge with the cross two bars impaled, sharply defined edges and without the crown. A secondary version, for ceremonial use and shown in the seal of the city with four pallets, quartered, and a former royal crown. The versions of 1996 caused such controversy, because they were not designed to conform to traditional heraldic rules and the content of the Law of local symbols of Catalonia, that led to the Catalan Society of Genealogy, Heraldry, Sigillography, Vexillology and Nobility lodged an appeal against them. This appeal to repeal the emblems of 1996 was successful and a most appropriate version had to be created, so the current arms, quartered with four bars was adopted in 2004.

== Crest ==
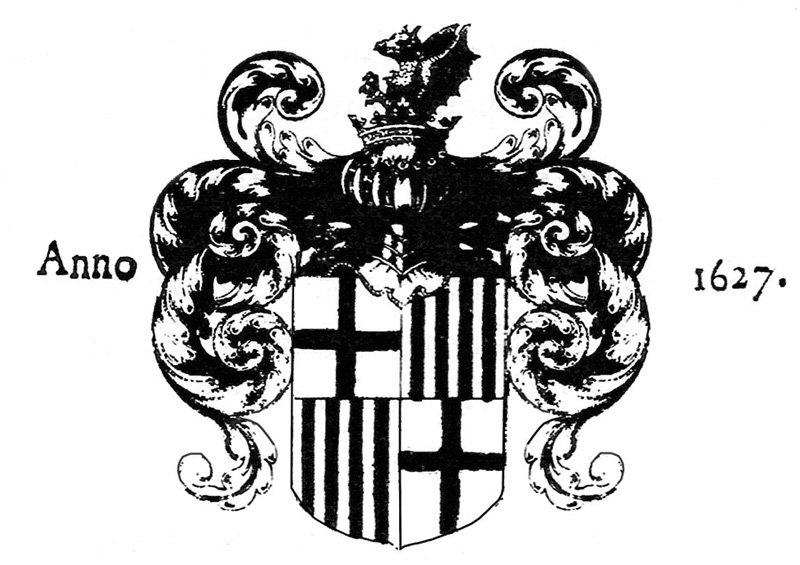
The coat of arms of Barcelona with the Aragonese royal crest (1627)

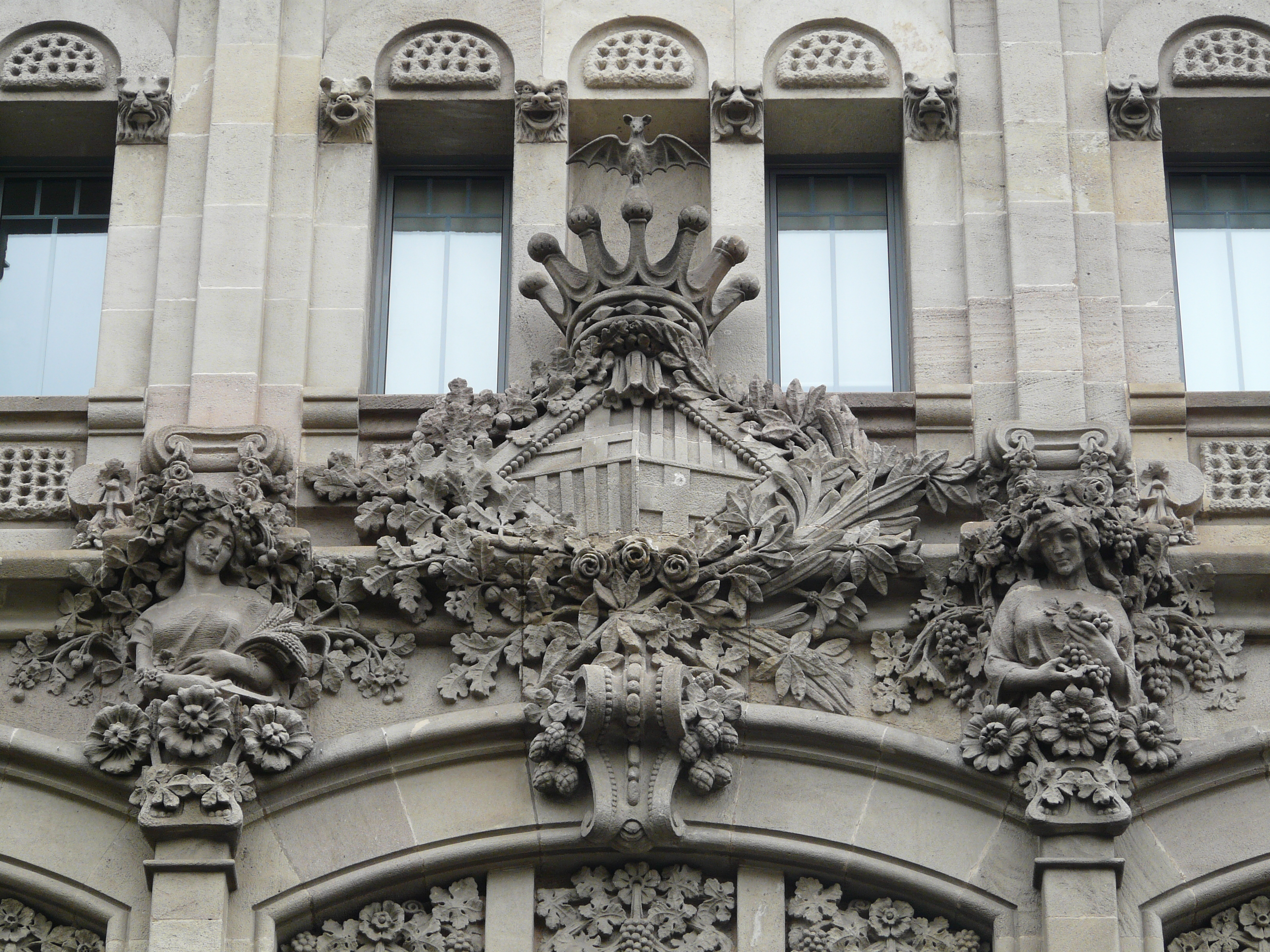
The coat of arms of Barcelona with a county crown and the crest of the bat (Early 20th Century)

Since the 15th century a former royal crown (without arches, orb and cross) set atop the shield, as was customary in territories of the Crown. In the 17th century was introduced the royal crest of the Aragonese monarchs, a winged dragon, as the city Valencia or Palma have done during the previous century. In some cases, the winged dragon will in time be transformed into in a bat, Rat penat, commonly used in local heraldry. Together with the crest, a helmet was situated above the shield and bears lambrequins and the former royal crown (open). By the 19th century the bat has cornered the dragon as can be seen in the Official Gazette of Catalonia and Barcelona since 1810. The bat and the former royal crown without the helmet were remained for much of the century.

The removal of the bat from the coat of arms of Barcelona has been seen as a loss of an emblematic symbol shared by other capitals of the former Crown of Aragon as Palma, capital of the former Kingdom of Mallorca and Valencia, in the former homonymous kingdom.

=== Royal and condal crown ===
During 16th and 17th centuries the use of the heraldry of Barcelona was also used as coat of arms of the Principality of Catalonia. This use may reflect the Principality as heir of the County of Barcelona or the governmental capacity of the Generalitat over the territory of the former county. The heraldry of the city of Barcelona has depicted different types of heraldic crowns, both royal or county crown have been used in different variants. The crown of count referred the history of the territory and the royal crown has been reflected the rank of the titular of the county. The royal crown equals city and territory as other realms of the Hispanic Monarchy. For this reason, the historiography referred to these holders as Count-King (Comte-rei). From 1800 to 1931, successive town and city councils used both crowns with or without the crest of the bat. After the Spanish Civil War, the coat of arms showed a former royal crown without the crest.

The current version has the modern Spanish Royal Crown, a crown a circlet Or and precious stones, with eight rosettes of oyster plant leaves, five visible, and eight pearls interspersed, closed at the top by eight half-arches, five visible, also adorned with pearls and surmounted by a cross on a globe.

=== Development ===
Shield
(14th–17th centuries)

Shield, Lozenge Variant
(14th–17th centuries)

Two Paletts Variant
(14th–17th centuries)

Two Pallets and Lozenge Variant
(14th–17th centuries)

Aragonese Royal Crest Variant
(17th–18th centuries)

Crest of the Bat Variant
(c.1790 – c.1870)

Crest of the Bat Variant
(c.1870 – 1931)

Crest of the Bat and Lozenge Variant
(c.1800 – 1931)

Version shown at the One Hundred Hall
(1924)

Common Version
(c.1931 – 1939)

Eight-Pointed Shaped Variant
(c.1931 – 1939)

Four Pallets Variant
(1939–1984)

Two Pallets Variant
(1939–1984)

1984–1996

Version of the Seal
(1996–2004)

Common Version
(1996–2004)

== Arms of the province of Barcelona ==
Coat of arms of the province of Barcelona

The coat of arms used by the Provincial Council of Barcelona was created by Royal Ordinance of 1 March 1871 after reviewing a report of the Real Academia de la Historia (English: Royal Academy of History). It was approved by the Provincial Council on 30 June 1874 (Provincial Official Journal of 10 November 1874).

The blazon of these arms is:

Or, four pallets Gules debruised with a lozenge Argent charged with a full cross Gules; all surrounded by a laurel branch on the dexter and an olive one on the sinister joined by a ribbon Gules; as crest a former royal crown (without half-arches, monde, and cross).

The provincial arms incorporated the elements of the heraldry of the city, the Saint George's Cross and the four red paletts on gold background of the Kings of Aragon and Counts of Barcelona, with a different form of combination. The sign of the Saint George's Cross was widely displayed on a lozenge by the City Council and the Generalitat. The laurel wreath is a symbol of victory and honor and the olive one represents peace. In Spain many civic coats of arms use the former or the modern Royal Crown as heraldic crest. The Provincial Council has a logo commonly used as official emblem. The provincial flag contains these arms but it has horizontal stripes.

== See also ==
- Coat of arms of Catalonia
- Coat of arms of the Crown of Aragon
- Flag of Barcelona.
- Saint George's Cross.
- Senyera
