= Languages of Catalonia =

- Official: Catalan, Spanish, Aranese
- Indigenous: Catalan, Aranese
- Immigrant: Berber, American Spanish, Maghrebi Arabic, Romanian, British English, Urdu
- Foreign: English, French
- Signed: Catalan Sign Language (official)
- Keyboard layout: Spanish QWERTY

There are four languages with official status in Catalonia (an autonomous community of Spain): Catalan; Spanish, which is official throughout Spain; Aranese, a dialect of Occitan spoken in the Aran Valley; and Catalan Sign Language. Many other languages are spoken in Catalonia as a result of recent immigration from all over the world.

Catalan has enjoyed special status since the approval of the Statute of Autonomy of 1979 which declares it to be the language "proper to Catalonia". Spanish had been the only official language for most of the period between the 18th century and 1975.

== Social use ==
First habitual language, 2018 Demographic Survey
Language	Identification language	Habitual language
Spanish	2 978 000 (46.6%)	3 104 000 (48.6%)
Catalan	2 320 000 (36.3%)	2 305 000 (36.1%)
Both languages	440 000 (6.9%)	474 000 (7.4%)
Other languages	651 000 (10.2%)	504 000 (7.9%)
Arabic	114 000 (1.8%)	61 000 (0.9%)
Romanian	58 000 (0.9%)	24 000 (0.4%)
English	29 000 (0.5%)	26 000 (0.4%)
French	26 000 (0.4%)	16 000 (0.2%)
Berber	25 000 (0.4%)	20 000 (0.3%)
Chinese	20 000 (0.3%)	18 000 (0.3%)
Other languages	281 000 (4.4%)	153 000 (2.4%)
Other combinations	96 000 (1.5%)	193 000 (3.0%)
Total population 15 year old and over	6 386 000 (100.0%)	6 386 000 (100.0%)

According to a 2008 survey, in everyday use, 45.9% of the population usually spoke Spanish, while 35.6% usually employed Catalan, and 12% of the population used either language habitually.

Over 45% of respondents used Spanish to address their parents (versus 36% who choose Catalan). This is attributed to extensive migration from other areas in Spain during the second half of the 20th century, as a consequence of which many Catalans have one or both parents born outside Catalonia. However, a majority (52.6%) used Catalan with their children (compared to 42.3% for Spanish). This can be attributed to some Spanish-speaking citizens shifting from their native language to Catalan at home.

Outside the family, 48.6% of the population indicated that they addressed strangers exclusively or preferentially in Catalan, while the proportion of those who used Spanish was 41.7%, and 8.6% claimed to use both equally.

=== Social origin of the language diversity ===
The main cause of Spanish and Catalan social bilingualism in modern Catalonia was large-scale migration from the rest of Spain during the 20th century, as Catalonia started a significant industrialization which demanded an increased workforce from elsewhere. Spanish has historically been spoken among a minority of civil servants born in other regions in Spain and among segments of the wealthiest bourgeoisie. Spanish has also been spoken as a second language by most Catalans, as it has been the only official language over long periods since the eighteenth century.

It has been calculated that the total population of Catalonia with no migration would have grown from 2 million people in 1900 to just 2.4 million in 1980, 39% of the real population of 6.1 million for that date, which was over 7.5 million in 2016. As a consequence, there exists a somewhat different identity for those whose native language is Catalan and those whose native language is Spanish, though it has been increasingly difficult to delineate the two groups; furthermore, there is a small but growing number of Catalans who consider both to be their mother tongue. According to anthropologist Kathryn Woolard, who has studied these identities, Catalans tend to classify anyone as either castellà (that is, having Spanish as their native language) or català (that is, having Catalan as their native language).

The claim that the population would have only increased 20% from 1900 to 1980 is disputable since the population of Spain as a whole doubled from 18 to 37 million even allowing for high levels of emigration from the province to the Western Hemisphere and Europe.

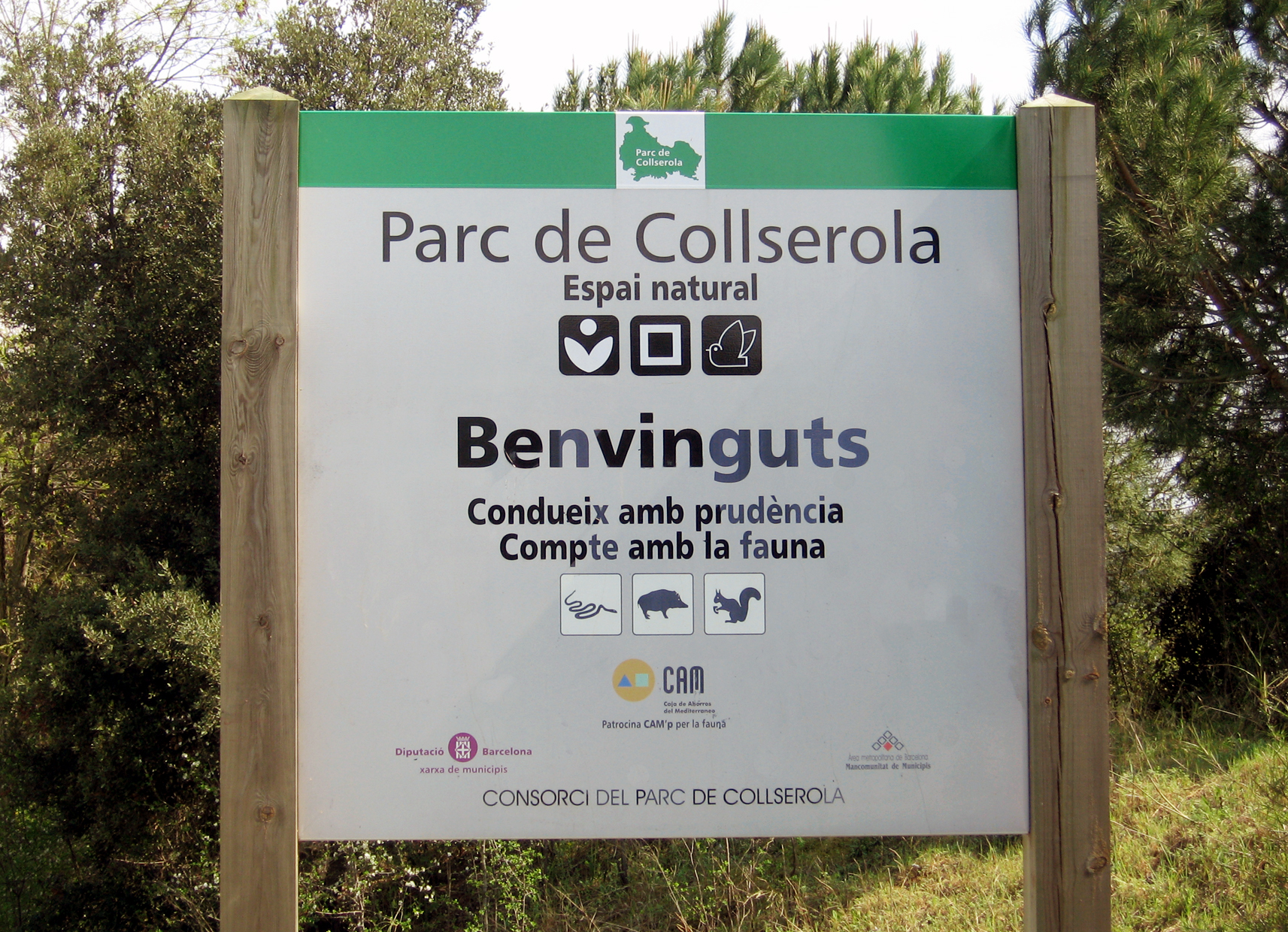
Many signs in Catalonia are in Catalan only.

== Statistics ==
Proportional distribution of native languages in Catalonia 2008.

According to the linguistic census elaborated by the Government of Catalonia corresponding to 2008, 45.92% of citizens over 15 years old declared Spanish as their [only] habitual language of use, versus 35.64% for Catalan, with 11.95% of complete bilinguals; a larger number claims Catalan as "their own language" (37.25% Catalan compared to 46.53% Spanish and 8.81% bilinguals).

Lastly, since the Statute of Autonomy of 1979, Aranese—a Gascon Occitan dialect—has been official and subject to special protection in the Aran Valley. This small area of 7,000 inhabitants was the only place where Occitan (spoken mainly in France and some Italian valleys) received full official status. However, on 9 August 2006, when the new Statute came into force, Aranese became official throughout Catalonia.

== Spanish ==
According to the government of Catalonia, Spanish, locally known as Castilian, is currently the most spoken language in Catalonia (45.9% daily users of Spanish vs. 35.6% daily users of Catalan vs. 11% daily users of both Spanish and Catalan) and especially in the Barcelona metropolitan area, as well as native language and usual language of many Catalan citizens. This language is widely prevalent in the press, cinema and in daily life.

Spanish is the language that Catalan citizens can read and write the most, due to the fact that until the 1980s it was the only language used in school and in all official communications.

The Spanish language in Catalonia (2009)
Knowledge	Individuals	Percentage
Can understand	6,973,500	99%
Can speak	6,793,900	96.4%
Can read	6,440,300	91.4%
Can write	6,258,200	88.8%
Population over 2 years old	7,049,900	--

The Spanish language developed from Vulgar Latin in the North of the Iberian Peninsula, expanding quickly to the South. It has lexical influences from Arabic and possible substrate influences from Basque and (to a lesser extent) Celtiberian. It has been the only official language in Spain for most periods since the eighteenth century.

== Catalan ==
According to the official government of Catalonia, Catalan is the second most spoken language of the region, after Spanish (over 35% of Catalans use exclusively Catalan as their first language, while 11% of Catalans use equally both Catalan and Spanish). It is the most spoken language in many comarques of Catalonia, with the exception of the Barcelona metropolitan area (Barcelonès plus surrounding comarques) and Camp de Tarragona. Catalan is a compulsory subject in schools and enjoys equals rights with Spanish throughout Catalonia.

Since the death of Franco (1975) and the approval of a new democratic Constitution in Spain, Catalan has experienced a new revival in its usage, first, due to the liberalisation and devolution of the Catalan linguistic and cultural institutions, and second, to their promotion. However, some political activists claim that Catalan-speaking people continue suffering some types of discrimination, as explained in the European Parliament on January 29, 2014.

Catalan, a Romance language, is regarded by some Iberian linguists as belonging to the Iberian Romance sub-family (which also includes Spanish, Portuguese, Galician, and Aragonese), while others (especially Occitanists) classify it within the Gallo-Romance sub-family (which includes French, Occitan and Gallo-Italian) languages. It shares attributes with both linguistic groups.

=== Literacy ===
According to the 2018 Linguistic Census, about 6,030,000 people in Catalonia (over 94% of the population) understand the Catalan language. The percentage of people aged fifteen and older who can speak, read and write Catalan is as follows:

Knowledge of Catalan (Total population: 6,385,613)
Ability	Individuals	Percentage
Understands	6,028,019	94.4%
Speaks	5,187,117	85.5%
Reads	5,463,121	81.2%
Writes	4,170,454	65.3%

As a result of the ongoing linguistic policies favouring Catalan, implemented in various degrees by the autonomous government during the last 30 years, knowledge of Catalan has advanced significantly in all these areas, with the ability to write it having experienced the most pronounced increase, from 31.6% of the population in 1986 to 65.3% in 2018.

By age groups, those between 10 and 29 have the highest level of Catalan-language literacy (e.g., 98.2% aged 10–14 understand it, and 85.2% can write it); this is attributed to these individuals having received their education in Catalan.

Geographically, Catalan is understood in northwest Catalonia (High Pyrenees, Aran Valley) by 97.4% of residents, followed by south and western Catalonia, whereas Barcelona's metropolitan area had the lowest knowledge, at 93.8%. The situation is analogous for written-language skills, with central Catalonia scoring the highest percentages (61.4%), and Barcelona the lowest (46.4%).

Barcelona is one of the main centres of the Spanish publishing industry for both Spanish-language and Catalan-language publishing.

== Aranese ==
According to the 2001 Aranese Linguistic Census, knowledge of Aranese in the Occitan-speaking territory of Aran is as follows:

Knowledge of Aranese (in Aran Valley)
Ability	Individuals	Percentage
Understand	6,712	88.88%
Speak	4,700	62.24%
Read	4,413	58.44%
Write	2,016	26.69%

Compared to previous data from 1996, the number of those able to understand Aranese has declined slightly (90.5% in 1996), while at the same time there has been a marginal increase in the number of those able to write it (24.97% in 1996).

By age groups, the largest percentage of those with knowledge of Aranese is in the 15-19 and 65-69 groups (both above 96%), while those aged 30–34 score lowest (just over 80%). Literacy is higher in the 10-19 group with over 88% declaring themselves able to read, and 76% able to write Aranese. Those over 80 are the least literate, with only about 1.5% of them being able to write the language.

In everyday use, according to 2008 data, Spanish is the main language in the Aran valley, habitually spoken by 38% of the population, then followed by Aranese, spoken by 23.4% of the population. In Aran, Catalan is the third language, habitually spoken by 16% of the population.

== Catalan Sign Language ==
According to Ethnologue, about 18,000 deaf Catalans use Catalan Sign Language (LSC, Llengua de signes catalana). Since, like other deaf sign languages, LSC has no generally used written form, there is no literacy data.

== Immigrant languages in Catalonia ==
As a part of the intense immigration process which Spain in general and Catalonia in particular have experienced over the last decade, there is a large number of immigrant languages spoken in various cultural communities in Catalonia, of which (Maghrebi) Arabic and Urdu are the most common if Spanish-speaking migrants are not taken into account.

From all four Provinces of Catalonia, the largest number of habitual foreign language speakers are located in Girona.

== Political and social issues ==
In Francoist Spain Catalan was, until the 1970s, excluded from the state education system and all other official and governmental use, including the prohibition of baptizing children with certain Catalan names. Rural-urban migration originating in other parts of Spain reduced the social use of the language in urban areas. Lately, a similar sociolinguistic phenomenon has occurred with foreign immigration. In an attempt to reverse this, the re-established self-government institutions of Catalonia embarked on a long term language policy to increase the use of Catalan and has, since 1983, enforced laws which attempt to protect, and extend, the use of Catalan. Some groups consider these efforts a way to discourage the use of Spanish, while some other, including the Catalan government and the European Union consider the policies not only respectful, but also an example which "should be disseminated throughout the Union".

Today, Catalan is the language of the Catalan autonomous government and the other public institutions that fall under its jurisdiction. Following Catalan Government rules, businesses are required to display all information (e.g. menus, posters) in Catalan under penalty of legal fines; following Spanish Government rules, there's the same obligation to display this information in Spanish; there is no obligation to display this information in Aranese, although there is no restriction on doing so in these or other languages. The use of fines was introduced in a 1997 linguistic law that aims to increase the use of Catalan. According to the law, both Catalan and Spanish – being official languages – can be used by the citizens without prejudice in all public and private activities even though the Generalitat usually uses only Catalan in its communications and notifications addressed to the general population. The citizens can also receive information from the Generalitat in Spanish if they so request. The various media belonging to Catalan government public broadcasting are monolingual in Catalan. However, except for a few hours in Catalan on La 2 and on some radio station, all the media belonging to the Spanish government are Spanish monolingual in Catalonia, as in the rest of Spain. The language policy favouring Catalan consistently implemented by the successive governments ruling the regional government of Catalonia since the 1980s has become increasingly contentious and controversial during the 2000s, especially in public education.

In this context, Catalan was the only language of instruction between 1979 and 2012. Thus, pupils were immersed in Catalan except for three hours per week of Spanish medium instruction. However, the most recent Spanish Education Law and some judicial sentences aim at increasing the time of instruction in Spanish for other subjects, if only one child per class asks it, even if the other families don't agree, because of complaints that current policies hinder the right to an education in Spanish.

Some political parties and civic organizations denounce this situation in which a co-official language like Spanish is barred from public education, claiming that this is a severe breach of civic rights and against the spirit of free circulation of people within Spain. In September 2008 a demonstration was held in Barcelona to support full coexistence of both languages without linguistic discrimination of either. In June 2012 the Supreme Court of Spain ruled that schools must also use Spanish as a medium of instruction, if parents wish it, and cannot force Catalan-language education on the entire population, citing the disadvantage of the inability to be educated in the national language and the necessity of maintaining the ability for citizens to move from one part of Spain to another without learning the local language.

Pro-Catalan language activists claimed that, by 2009, some activities could not be carried out in Catalan because of the existence of 500 different regulations ensuring the preeminence of the Spanish language.
