= History of telephone service in Catalonia =

Telephone services in Catalonia were introduced in the late 19th century. At the start of the 20th century, the Spanish government left it to private industry to create the infrastructure needed for telephone communications, as a result the companies created only the lines they thought would be profitable. At the time there were two telephone companies in Catalonia: Companyia Telefònica del Vallès and Companyia Peninsular de Telèfons.

The Commonwealth of Catalonia, started the process of linking the majority of Catalan towns by telephone. After Spanish prime minister Miguel Primo de Rivera abolished the Commonwealth, work on the Catalan intercity telephone network was interrupted. It would not be completed until after the Spanish Civil War.

== Early development ==
- 1877: On 16 December, the first telephone trials in the Iberian peninsula take place, between two lecture halls in the College of Industry, Barcelona. The first long-distance telephone conference takes place, between Barcelona and Girona on 26 December.
- 1884: A royal decree establishes a state monopoly over all telephone services.
- 1886: The take-over of phone service by private companies is authorized.
- 1896: On 20 April, an intercity telephone line between Barcelona, Saragossa and Madrid is inaugurated.
- 1913: The Companyia Telefònica del Vallès begins telephone services.
- 1896: On 29 May 1896 the Directorate-General of the Post Office orders that the use of Catalan is prohibited in intercity telephone communications. This ban was lifted by royal decree on 20 June 1896.

=== Expansion of services ===
The Telephone Department of the Commonwealth of Catalonia is founded on 2 March 1915. The Telephone Department is charged with bringing telephone service to all parts of Catalonia. On 20 July, the Commonwealth signs an agreement with the Companyia Peninsular de Telèfons, allowing the Commonwealth to lay down those lines it sees fit to create, without prejudice to the rights of the company. A royal decree on 9 September authorizes the Commonwealth to install and operate the remaining Catalan telephone network to form "an intercity telephone network capable of joining some or all of the people of the four provinces of the Catalan Commonwealth".

In 1916, the Barcelona Technology Agency of the Telephone Department of the Commonwealth is formed. On 1 July, the phonebox at Mollerussa becomes operational and on 8 August the phonebox at Lleida becomes operational. On 3 February 1924, the first automatic telephone exchange in Spain is inaugurated in Balaguer.

On 19 April 1924, The Spanish National Telephone Company is constituted and in 1925, the Commonwealth's telephone network becomes part of the Spanish National Telephone Company. Telephone service is instituted between Spain and the United States in 1928. Following the Spanish Civil War, the era of State control of the telephone service begins.

=== Deregulation of the telephone service ===
The entry of Spain to the European Union leads to the promulgation of the Law on the Regulation of the Telecommunications Industry, which regulates the new certification system for telephone companies and allows for the entry of other network operators.

== See also ==
- History of Catalonia
- Esteban Terradas i Illa
- Compañía Telefónica Nacional de España
