= List of airports in Catalonia =

This is a list of airports in Catalonia, sorted by location.

== Airports in Catalonia ==
Location served	ICAO	IATA	Other	Airport name
Public airports				
Barcelona (El Prat)	LEBL	BCN		Barcelona–El Prat Airport
Girona	LEGE	GRO		Girona–Costa Brava Airport
La Seu d'Urgell / Andorra	LESU	LEU		Andorra–La Seu d'Urgell Airport
Lleida	LEDA	ILD		Lleida–Alguaire Airport
Reus, Tarragona	LERS	REU		Reus Airport
Sabadell	LELL		QSA	Sabadell Airport

== Catalonia's busiest airports (2016) ==
Rank	Airport	Location	Code	Total passengers	% Change 2015-2016	Aircraft movements	Cargo traffic
1.	Barcelona Airport	Barcelona	BCN	44,154,693	▲11.2	307,864	132,754,964
