= International relations of Catalonia =

The International relations of Catalonia conducted by the Catalan Government seek the promotion of Catalonia and Catalan interests overseas by promoting its culture, education and research, economy (including trade and investments), support to the Catalan diaspora and positioning Catalonia internationally as a global, responsible polity. Responsibility for Catalan international relations currently lies with the Ministry of European Union and Foreign Action, established in 2016.

Although according to the Spanish Constitution the exclusive competence on international relations belongs exclusively to the Government of Spain, the Statute of Autonomy of Catalonia amended in 2006 contains and describes a series of devolved powers over foreign action allowed to the Government of Catalonia.

== History ==
The Ministry of Foreign Affairs, Institutional Relations and Transparency was created on 14 January 2016 with the aim of making the Catalan self-determination process visible on an international scale. Shortly after it was made public, the Government of Spain filed an appeal with the Constitutional Court of Spain, which admitted it for processing and on 17 February of the same year, suspended its name.

== European Union ==
Map of the Four Motors for Europe (in light blue), on a map of EU27 (2007–2013)

Catalonia has a long pro-European tradition, although minority currents calling for its exit from the EU. Catalonia is part of the Pyrenees-Mediterranean Euroregion along with the Balearic Islands and the French region of Occitania.

Some of the Catalan politicians who have held high-level positions in the EU include Josep Borrell, President of the European Parliament between 2004 and 2007 and High Representative of the European Union for Foreign Affairs and Security Policy between 2019 and 2025, and Amadeu Altafaj, Spokesperson for Economic Affairs of the European Commission.

Civil society has a strong pro-European character, with organisations such as the Catalan Council of the European Movement (CCME), Horitzó Europa and the Catalunya-Europa Foundation. One of the 36 information offices of the European Parliament is located in Barcelona.

== Delegations of the Government abroad ==
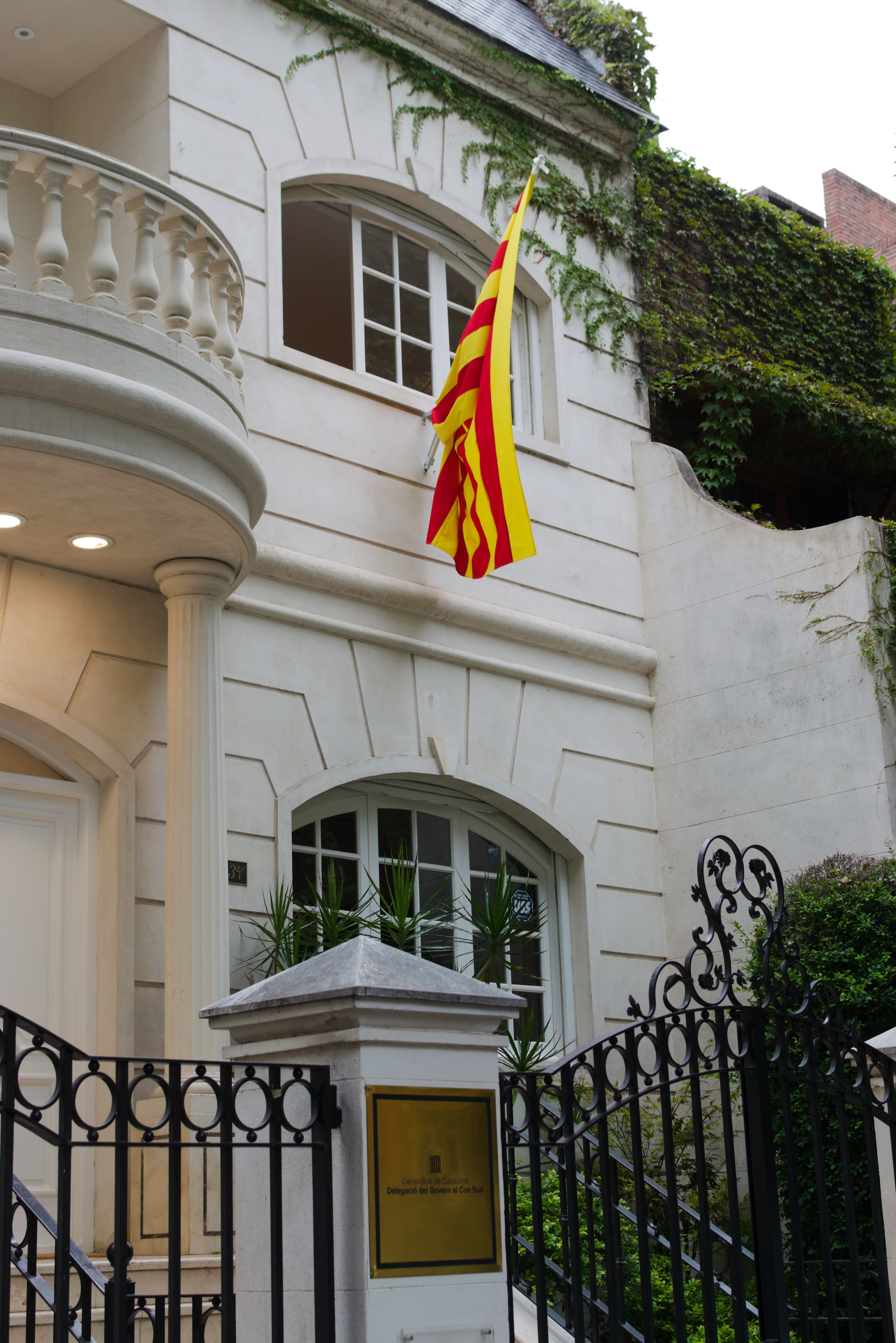
Delegation of the Government of Catalonia in Buenos Aires, Argentina

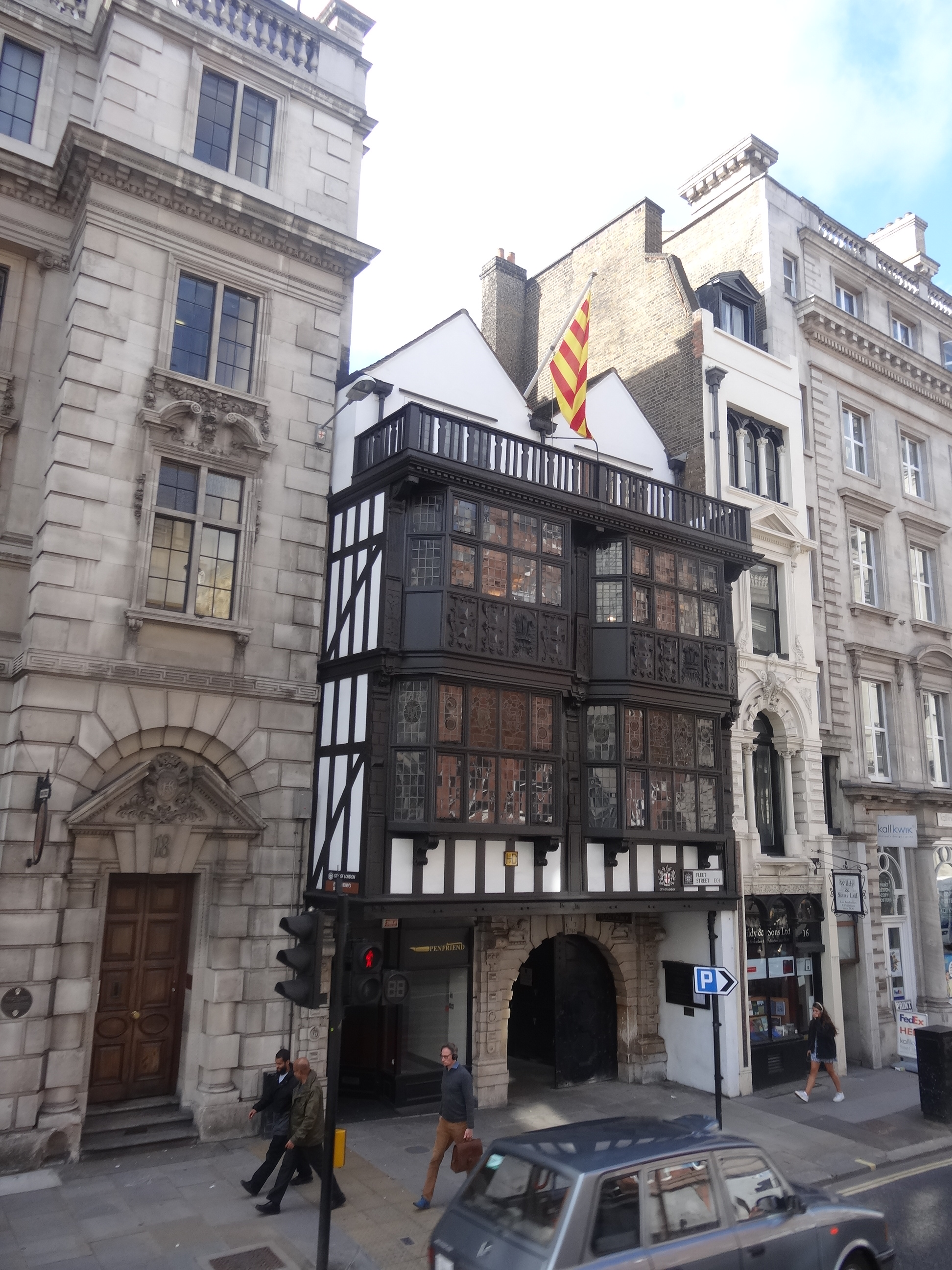
Delegation of the Government of Catalonia in London, United Kingdom

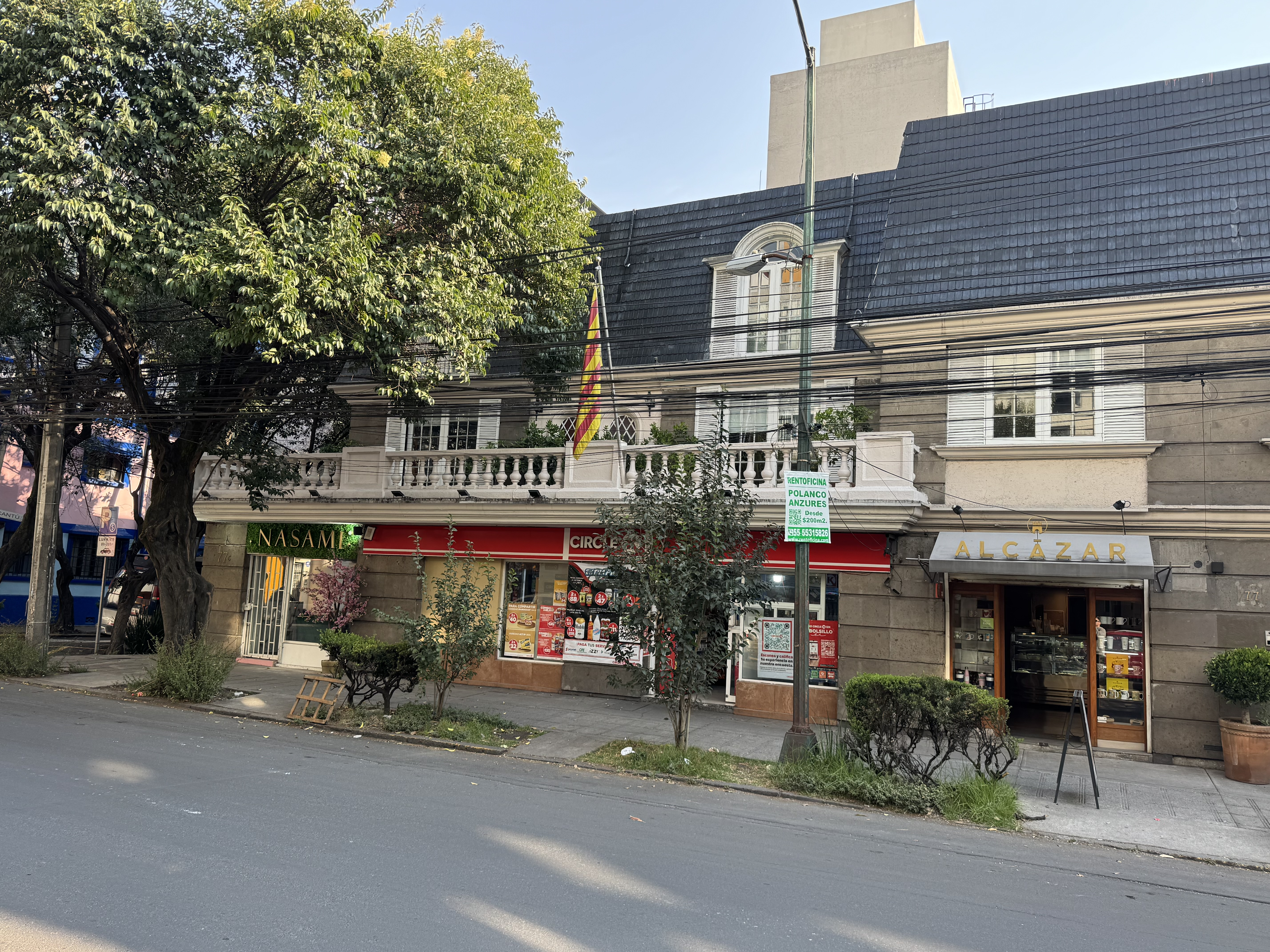
Delegation of the Government of Catalonia in Mexico City, Mexico

A Delegation of the Government of Catalonia abroad (Catalan: Delegació del Govern de Catalunya a l'exterior) is an office that represents the Government of Catalonia around the world. The purposes of the delegations are to represent, defend and promote the general interests of Catalonia outside of Spain. These types of entities are overseen by the Ministry of European Union and Foreign Action of the Generalitat de Catalunya.

Currently, Catalonia's Ministry for Foreign Action and Europe maintains 17 delegations, including the one before the European Union. This is the list of the current delegations of the Government of Catalonia abroad:

=== Africa ===
- Tunisia
  - Tunis

=== America ===
- Argentina
  - Buenos Aires
- Mexico
  - Mexico City
- United States
  - Washington, D.C.
  - New York City (office)

=== Asia ===
- South Korea
  - Seoul

=== Europe ===
- Andorra
  - Andorra la Vella
- Austria
  - Vienna
- Belgium
  - Brussels (delegation before the European Union)
- Croatia
  - Zagreb
- France
  - Paris
  - Perpignan (House of the Generalitat)
- Germany
  - Berlin
- Italy
  - Rome
  - Alghero (office)
- Portugal
  - Lisbon
- Sweden
  - Stockholm
- Switzerland
  - Geneva
- United Kingdom
  - London

== International Consular missions in Catalonia ==
Catalonia has a total of over 35 consular missions, all of them except one based in the capital city, Barcelona.

=== Barcelona ===
- Argentina
- Brazil
- Belgium
- Bolivia
- Canada
- China
- Chile
- Colombia
- Cuba
- Dominican Republic
- Ecuador
- France
- Germany
- Hungary
- Italy
- Japan
- Mexico
- Morocco
- Netherlands
- Pakistan
- Panama
- Paraguay
- Peru
- Poland
- Portugal
- Romania
- Russia
- Switzerland
- Turkey
- Ukraine
- United States
- United Kingdom
- Uruguay
- Venezuela

=== Tarragona ===
- Morocco

== See also ==
- Principality of Catalonia
- Statute of Autonomy of Catalonia
- Catalan independence movement
- 2017–2018 Spanish constitutional crisis
- Generalitat de Catalunya
- Government of Carles Puigdemont
- Government of Quim Torra
- Government of Pere Aragonès
