= Advisory Council for the National Transition =

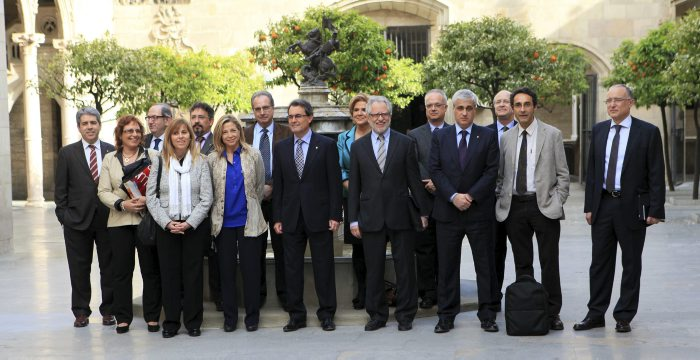
Members of the Consell Assessor per a la Transició Nacional in Barcelona

The Advisory Council for the National Transition (in Catalan: Consell Assessor per a la Transició Nacional) is a body created by the Government of Catalonia in 2013. Its purpose is to advise the government on the national transition of Catalonia and achieving Catalan self-determination referendum. The main task of this body is to analyze the different factors to consider in the process of transition to an independent Catalonia.

The CATN made a total of 18 reports which were published individually and jointly in the White Paper on the National Transition of Catalonia.

== Reports ==
- The consultation on the political future of Catalonia
- Internationalization of the poll and the self-determination process of Catalonia
- Paths for Catalonia’s integration in the European Union
- Integration in the International Community
- The fiscal and financial viability of an independent Catalonia
