= Coat of arms of the Crown of Aragon =

Arms of the Crown of Aragon

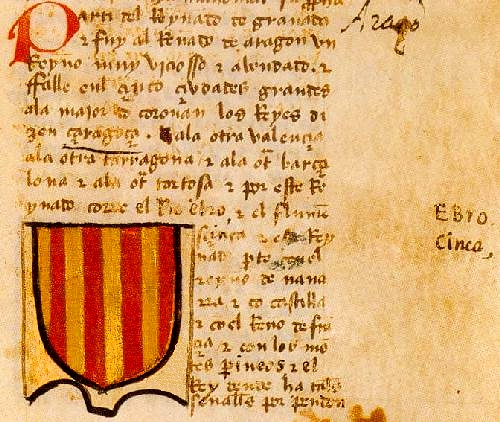
Page of a manuscript of the Book of Knowledge of All Kingdoms (14th century) showing the coat of arms of Aragon.

The coat of arms (Note: Also bars of Aragon, royal sign of Aragon, royal arms of Aragon, the four bars, and the red bars.) of the Crown of Aragon bears four red pallets on a gold background, and depicts the familiar coat of the Counts of Barcelona and Kings of Aragon. In 1137, the Kingdom of Aragon and the County of Barcelona merged by dynastic union. It differs from the flag because this latter instead uses bars. It is one of the oldest coats of arms in Europe dating back to a seal of Raymond Berengar IV, Count of Barcelona and Prince of Aragon, from 1150.

Today, this symbol has been adopted in the coat of arms of several modern countries, such as the coat of arms of Spain, which wears it in its third quarter (whereas the Kings of Spain are heirs of those of Aragon), and the coat of arms of Andorra, which shows it on two of its quarters. It is also the main element of the coat of arms of the Spanish autonomous communities of Catalonia, the Valencian Community and the Balearic Islands, as well as being the fourth quarter of the Spanish autonomous community of Aragon. It is also present on the coats of arms of the French administrative regions of Provence-Alpes-Côte d'Azur and Occitania (whose Pyrénées-Orientales department regroups the old provinces of Roussillon and Upper Cerdanya), and the coats of arms of the Italian provinces of Reggio Calabria and Catanzaro in Calabria, and Lecce in Apulia. It figures also in numerous located municipal blazons in the former territories of the Crown of Aragon, either by explicit concession of the king, or because they were cities or towns of reialenc or realengo (that is, directly dependent on the Crown and subject to no kind of manorialism). Others locations outside the former Crown of Aragon may also use the coat of arms, in which case the symbol is typically present due to the presence of the king or knights of the Crown at some moment of their local history.

== Heraldic description ==
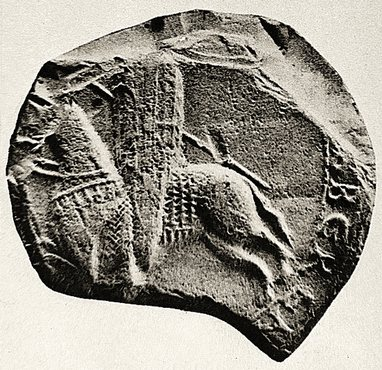
Seal of Ramon Berenguer IV, count of Barcelona (1150). Earliest confirmed evidence of the pallets

The blazon of the arms is: Or, four pallets of gules. In heraldry, the escutcheon is commonly known as that of Aragon.

These pallets of gules are commonly named in popular usage and culture as the "red bars" or the "four bars".

It has been described on the Middle Ages armorials as in "Armorial du Hérault Vermandois", 1285–1300, as that of the King of Aragon, naming specifically Peter III as one of the bearers, is described as These are the arms of the Counts of Barcelona who acquired Aragón by marriage (...), the one of Count of Barcelona is the same or three pallets gules, the arms of the King of Majorca are those of Aragon, with the coat of arms of James II, King of Majorca being or four pallets gules a bend azure and that of the King of Ternacle d Aragon et Ternacle en flanquiet lun dedans lautre (...) Per pale or four pallets gules and argent (...). The coat of arms with the four red pales on a gold background appears on several other coats of arms, named as "of Aragon".

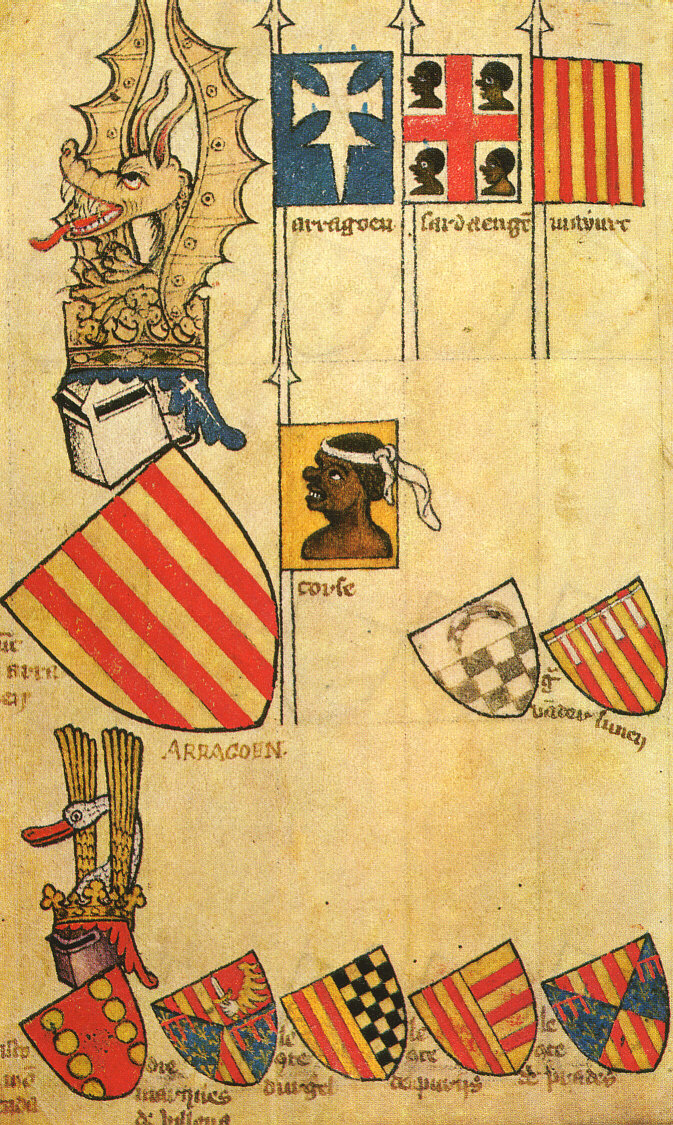
First image shows page 62 of the Gelre Armorial. Second image displays a version of the coat of arms of the kings, created by the king Peter IV of Aragon, with the blue and white cross flag attributed by Peter to the old kings of Aragon and the pales to the counts of Barcelona.

Also mentioned in Armorial de Gelre, 1370–1395, the coat of arms of Peter IV Die Coninc v[on] Arragoen is golden with four pallers of gulets or the Armorial d'Urfé, 1380, sont les armes de le Conte de Cathalogne, and in armorial de Charolais, 1425, arms conte de Barselongne and armorial Le Blanq (sources from 1420 to 1450) venant des contes de Barselone, armorial Wijnbergen, King of Aragon or four pallets gules

== History ==
Originally it was the familiar emblem of the Kings of Aragon and Counts of Barcelona. In 1137, when Aragon and the County of Barcelona merged by dynastic union by the marriage of Raymond Berengar IV of Barcelona and Petronila of Aragon, these titles were finally borne by only one person when their son Alfonso II of Aragon ascended to the throne in 1162. Slowly the various entities and territories over which the House of Aragon-Barcelona ruled and came to rule came to be called the Crown of Aragon.

"The new ruler of the united dynasty (Raymond Berenger IV of Barcelona) called himself count of Barcelona and Prince of Aragón."

The son of Ramon Berenguer IV and Petronila, Alfonso II of Aragon and I of Barcelona, inherited both the titles of King of Aragon and Count of Barcelona, in a style that would be maintained by all its successors to the crown. Thus, this union was made while respecting the existing institutions and parliaments of both territories.

It constitutes the third quarter section of the coat of arms of the Kingdom of Spain.

== Theories of origin ==
=== Theories of Catalan origin ===
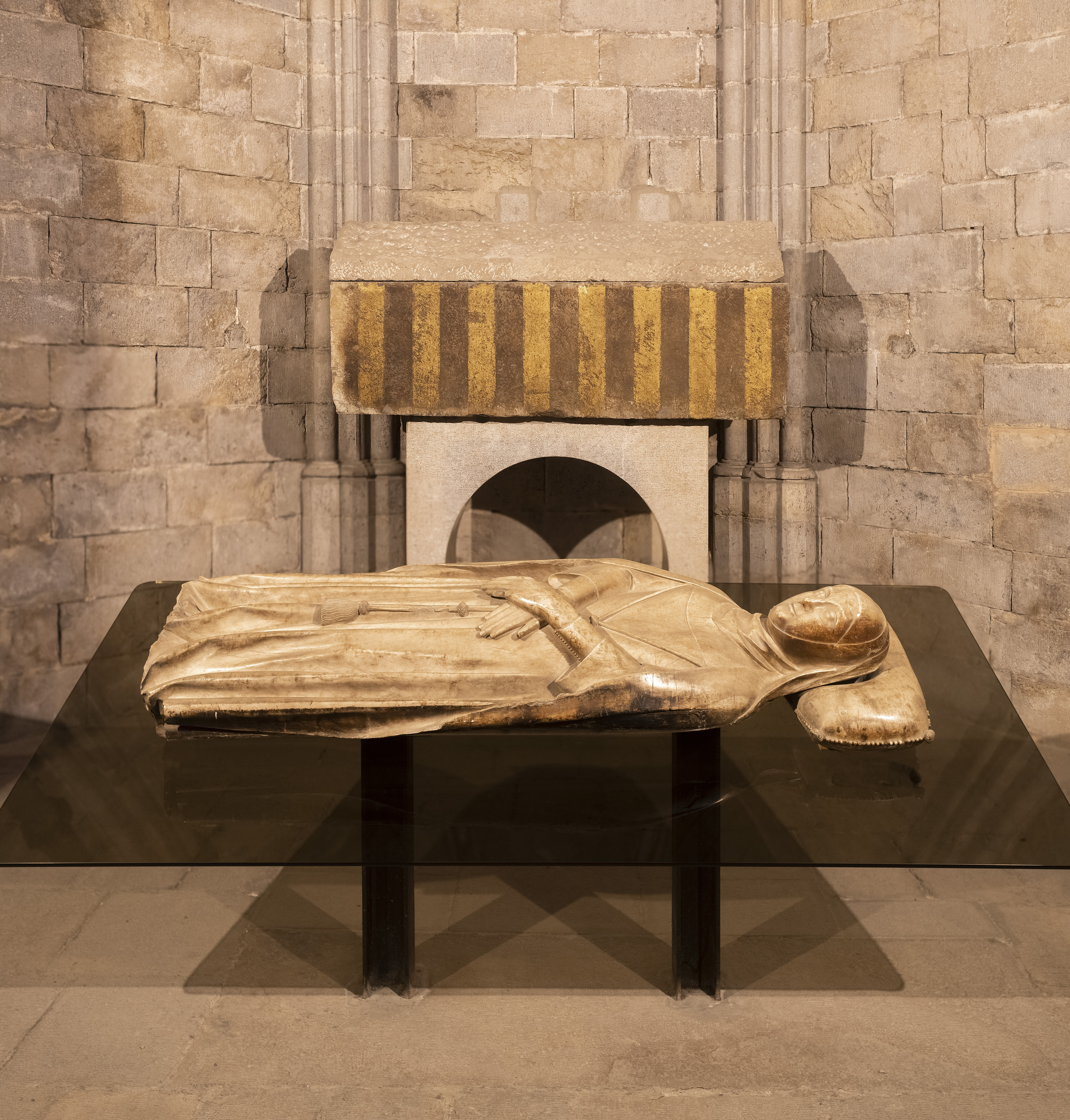
Tomb of Ermessenda great-grandmother from Barcelona's Count Ramon Berenguer II Cap d'estopes.

The oldest evidence where the arms can be seen is from 1150, in a seal of Ramon Berenguer IV, Count of Barcelona. The seal evidence is disputed by some Aragonese authors who claim that the first documented evidence dates from the reign of Alfonso II, king of Aragon and count of Barcelona.

As a pre-heraldic symbol, the red bars on a yellow background are found on the Romanesque tombs of Barcelona's Count Ramon Berenguer II Cap d'estopes, who died in 1082, and his great-grandmother Ermessenda, who died in 1058, wife of Count Ramon Borrell I, both of whose tombs were at the portico of the old Romanesque Cathedral of Girona; it is not sure that the 15 bars of gold appearing in a painting are contemporary to the tombs. It is a proof that relates the arms to the Counts of Barcelona lineage and the pre-heraldic forms indicate pre-heraldic times, before the second third of the 12th century.

=== Theories of Aragonese origin ===
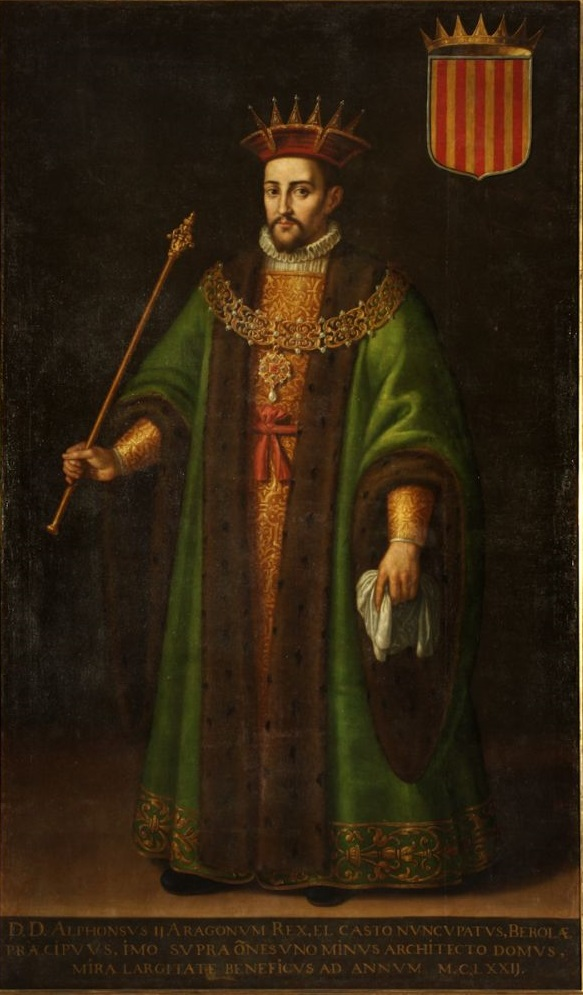
Alfonso II, first king of the united Catalan-Aragonese dynasty.

The exact origin of the four bars symbol is obscure, and for long it has been explained by legends, now proven false. According to some Aragonese scholars, the first undisputed evidences are from the Alfonso II (king of Aragon and count of Barcelona) reign.

Even though a purely Aragonese origin for the four bars symbol has been proposed, the main point held by Aragonese authors (Fatás, Ubieto, Montaner), partially supported by some Catalan historians like Ferran de Segarra, is that the key evidence for the Catalan origin, the Marseilles seals, is dubious. The lines in the monochrome Marseilles seals are interpreted as mere scratchings by some, and as representation of a shield reinforcement by others. This theory was rejected by Aragonese member of the International Heraldry Academy Faustino Menéndez-Pidal.

A second point put forward by Aragonese authors is that Ramon Berenguer IV, Count of Barcelona was the de facto ruler of Aragon, even if only his son Alfonso II would become de jure king of Aragon. Therefore, any symbol associated with Ramon Berenguer IV can also be attributed to the then budding Crown of Aragon.

== Variations ==
=== Arms of sovereign states ===
Coat of arms of Andorra

Coat of arms of Spain

=== Arms of modern administrative regions ===
The Pallets can be seen in the arms of several administrative divisions of Spain, France and Italy, all of them former territories of the Crown of Aragon.

==== Spain ====
Coat of arms of Aragon

Coat of arms of the Balearic Islands

Seal of the Government of Catalonia

Coat of arms of the Valencian Community

Coat of arms of the Province of Alicante

Coat of arms of the Province of Barcelona

Coat of arms of the Province of Tarragona

===== France =====
Coat of arms of Occitania

Coat of arms of the department of Ariège

Coat of arms of the department of Lozère

Coat of arms of the department of Pyrénées-Orientales

Coat of arms of
Provence-Alpes-Côte d'Azur

===== Italy =====
Coat of arms of the Province of Catanzaro

Coat of arms of the Province of Lecce

Coat of arms of the Province of Reggio Calabria

===== Overseas =====
Variant Coat of arms of Puerto Rico

=== Arms of Cities ===
Coat of arms of Albarracín

Coat of arms of Alcañiz

Coat of arms of Alghero

Coat of arms of Alicante

Coat of arms of Badalona

Coat of arms of Barcelona

Coat of arms of Barceloneta, Puerto Rico

Coat of arms of Canela, Chile

Coat of arms of Cariñena

Coat of arms of Caspe

Coat of Castellón de la Plana

Coat of arms of Cervera

Coat of arms of Cuarte de Huerva

Coat of arms of Cullera

Coat of arms of Daroca

Coat of arms of Foix

Coat of arms of Fraga

Coat of arms of Girona

Coat of arms of Mataró

Coat of arms of Lleida

Coat of arms of Palma de Mallorca

Coat of arms of Orihuela

Coat of arms of Perpignan

Coat of arms of Sabiñánigo

Coat of arms of Salamanca

Coat of arms of San Germán, Puerto Rico

Coat of arms of Tamarite de Litera

Coat of arms of Tarazona

Coat of arms of Tarragona

Coat of arms of Tarragona

Coat of arms of Teruel

Coat of arms of Utebo

Coat of arms of Valencia

== See also ==
- Bat (heraldry)
- Coat of arms of Spain
- Heraldry of Castile
- Heraldry of León
- Senyera
- Spanish heraldry
