= Emblem of the Government of Catalonia =

Governmental iconography

Versions
- Bicolour version

- St George's Cross (used until 1714)
- Armiger: Generalitat de Catalunya
- Adopted: 1931. Current version, 1981
- Shield: Or, four pallets
- Supporters: Laurel leaves
- Earlier version(s): St George's Cross
- Use: Generalitat's institutions (Parliament, the President, and the Executive Council or Government of Catalonia). Official documents, vehicles, and buildings.

The emblem of the Government of Catalonia is the symbol that represents the Government of Catalonia, its institutions and related organs.

It was designed by Bartomeu Llongueras during the Second Spanish Republic. Traditionally, St George's Cross had been used as the Generalitat's emblem.

After Spain's transition to democracy and the restoration of Catalonia's self-government, it was reinstated, albeit in a slightly modified version, in order to avoid confusion when placing the emblem upside down (described by statute in 1981, decree 7/1981).

In some situations, a bicolour version is preferred, instead of the traditional tricolour one.

== See also ==
- Seal (emblem)
- St George's Cross
