= Dynastic union =

Union where multiple states are governed under a dynasty

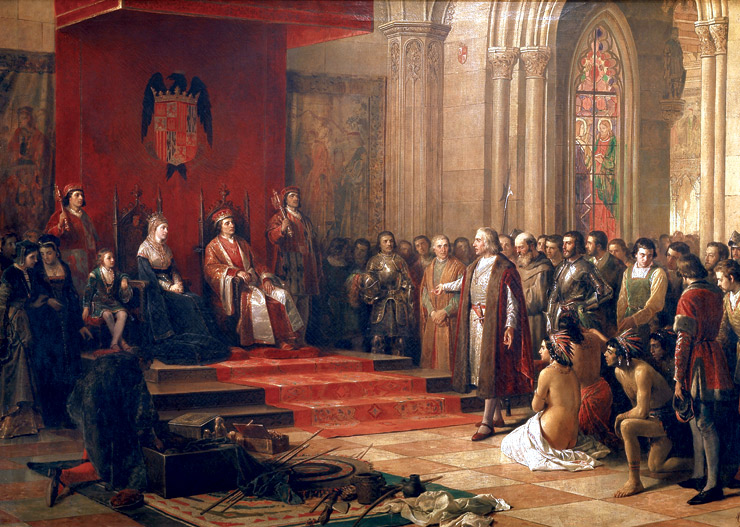
The Catholic Monarchs and Christopher Columbus, 1493

A dynastic union is a type of union in which different states are governed beneath the same dynasty, with their boundaries, their laws, and their interests remaining distinct from each other.

It is a form of association looser than a personal union, when several states share the same monarch, and a real union, when they have common institutions in addition to the same monarch.

== Historical examples ==
=== Marriage ===
==== Iberia ====
Marriage of Count of Barcelona Raymond Berengar IV of Barcelona and future Queen of Aragon Petronila of Aragon in 1137 that formed the Crown of Aragon.

Marriage of Isabella I of Castile and Ferdinand II of Aragon in 1469 that laid the foundations for the monarchy of Spain. They did not ascend to their respective thrones until 1474 and 1479 respectively.

==== Lithuania and Poland ====
Marriage of Jogaila and Queen Jadwiga of Poland on 1385, generally called the Union of Krewo. That union laid the foundations for the eventual formation of the Polish–Lithuanian Commonwealth.

==== Scotland and France ====
Norman or French culture first gained a foothold in Scotland during the Davidian Revolution, when King David I introduced Continental-style reforms throughout all aspects of Scottish life: social, religious, economic and administrative. He also invited immigrant French and Anglo-French peoples to Scotland. This effectively created a Franco-Scottish aristocracy, with ties to the French aristocracy as well as many to the Franco-English aristocracy. From the Wars of Scottish Independence, as common enemies of England and its ruling House of Plantagenet, Scotland and France started to enjoy a close diplomatic relationship, the Auld Alliance, from 1295 to 1560. From the Late Middle Ages and into the Early Modern Period Scotland and its burghs also benefited from close economic and trading links with France in addition to its links to the Low Countries, Scandinavia and the Baltic.

The prospect of dynastic union came in the 15th and 16th centuries, when Margaret, eldest daughter of James I of Scotland, married the future Louis XI of France. James V of Scotland married two French brides in succession. His infant daughter, Mary I, succeeded him on his death in 1542. For many years thereafter the country was ruled under a regency led by her French mother, Mary of Guise, who succeeded in marrying her daughter to the future Francis II of France. The young couple were king and queen of France and Scotland from 1559 until Francis died in 1560. Mary returned to a Scotland heaving with political revolt and religious revolution, which made a continuation of the alliance impossible.

Cordial economic and cultural relations did continue however, although throughout the 17th century, the Scottish establishment became increasingly Presbyterian, often belligerent to Catholicism, a facet which was somewhat at odds with Louis XIV's aggressively Catholic foreign and domestic policy. The relationship was further weakened by the Union of the Crowns in 1603, which meant from then on that although still independent, executive power in the Scottish government, the Crown, was shared with the Kingdom of England and Scottish foreign policy came into line more with that of England than with France. France would later support the Catholic Stuart pretenders.

=== Shared Dynasty ===
==== Iberia ====
With the assassination of Sancho IV, Navarre was invaded by his cousins Alfonso VI of Castile and Sancho V Ramirez of Aragon, and the latter was made king in 1076, which led to more than half a century (1076–1134) of Aragonese control. They were members of the Jiménez dynasty which ruled over all Christian kingdoms 1037–1126 in Spain.

States of the Crown of Aragon

The Crown of Aragon was a composite monarchy but some of its states were given to relatives. For example king James II of the Kingdom of Majorca was the brother of Peter III of Aragon, whose son Frederick III became king of Trinacria (Sicily) and Frederick's son Manfred became Duke of Athens and Neopatria.

A dynastic union existed between Spain (the union between the Crowns of Castile and Aragon) and Portugal (1580–1640), generally called the Iberian Union by modern historians, under the Philippine Dynasty.

==== Habsburg ====
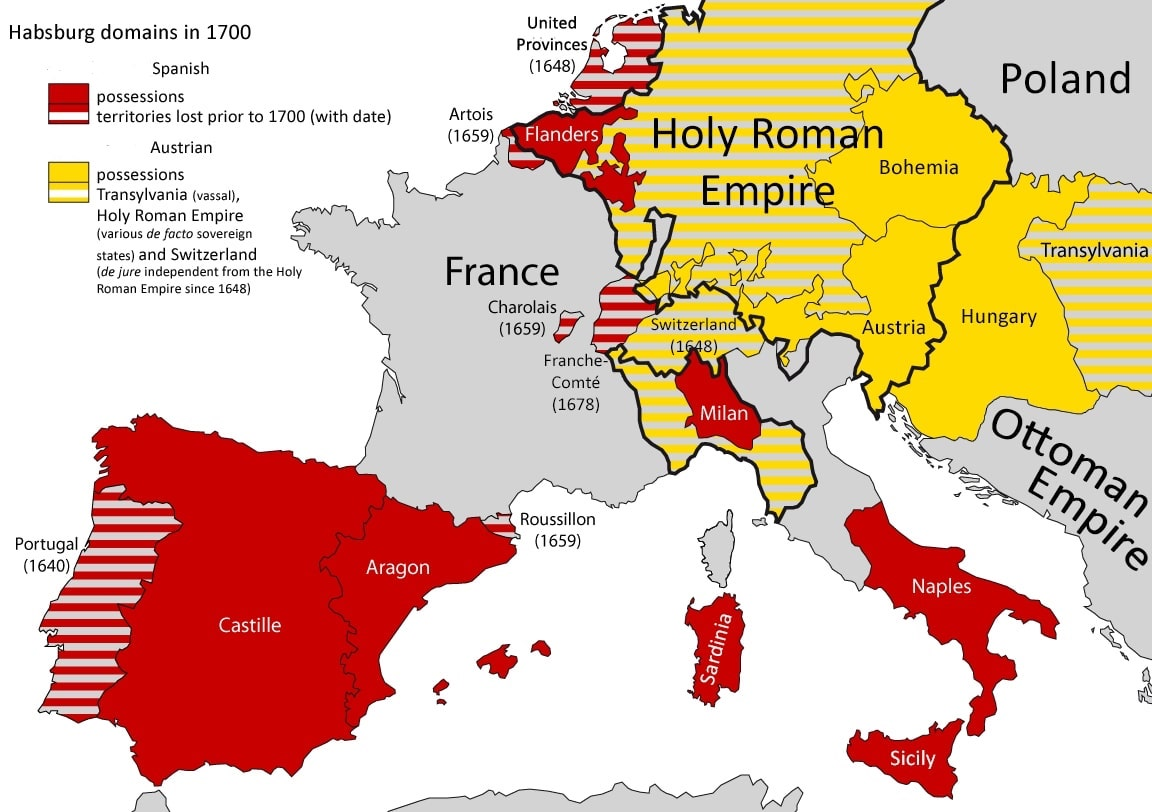
Habsburg dominions as partitioned by Charles V.

At the end of the reign of Charles V, Holy Roman Emperor, he split his empire into a Spanish and Austrian line who remained closely allied and famously heavily intermarried. A similar situation appeared in Northern Italy, Grand Duchy of Tuscany (1737–1860), the Duchy of Modena and Reggio (1814–1859), the Duchy of Parma and Piacenza (1815–1847) and the Duchy of Massa and Carrara (1829–1836) were all ruled by cadet branches of the Habsburg dynasty and became increasingly dependent from the Austrian Empire.

==== Kievan Rus' ====
Kievan Rus' was officially ruled by a grand prince but was de facto an amalgamation of different principalities ruled by the Rurik dynasty.

==== Capet ====
===== Frankish Greece =====
Many Latin states or titles in Greece were held by different branches of the Capetian dynasty. They were Latin Emperors (who were officially the overlords of all states) since 1216, Kings of Albania (since 1271), (titular) Kings of Thessalonica (since 1266 Burgundian claim or 1274 Angevin claim) and Prince of Achaea since 1316. Additionally, they were related and overlapped with the Kings of Naples, with Charles III of Naples being Prince of Achaea, King of Naples and even King of Hungary and Croatia at once.

===== France and Navarre =====
Philip IV of France became jure uxoris king of Navarre in 1284 through his marriage with Joan I of Navarre and Navarre remained in a personal union with France until the death Charles IV of France. Then the likewise Capetian Évreux took the throne until the death of Blanche I of Navarre in 1441.

With Antoine of Navarre the House of Bourbon gained control over Lower Navarre in 1555 through a marriage Joan III of Navarre. Following Salic law, Henry III, King of Navarre, a member of the House of Bourbon, succeeded to the French throne in 1589 upon the extinction of the male line of the House of Valois. Both houses were cadet branches of the Capetian dynasty, the ruling house of the kingdom of France since 987.

==== United Kingdom and Hanover ====
The personal union between the United Kingdom of Great Britain and Ireland and the Kingdom of Hanover, jointly ruled by the head of the House of Hanover since 1707, ended with the death of William IV in 1837, and was replaced with a dynastic union: due to the different laws of succession, he was succeeded by two members of the dynasty, in the United Kingdom by his niece Victoria, the daughter of his late next brother Prince Edward, Duke of Kent and Strathearn, and in Hanover by his second next brother Ernest Augustus.

King Ernest Augustus hoped that his son and heir, the future George V, could marry Queen Victoria, his first cousin, which, provided they had had a son and joint heir, would have reunited the two countries in a personal union; however, this did not happen. The dynastic union lasted until the annexation of Hanover by Prussia in 1866.
