= Coat of arms of Castile and León =

- Armiger: Castile and León
- Adopted: 1230
- Crest: A former royal crown (without arches, orb and cross)
- Shield: Quarterly: 1 and 4 Castile, 2 and 3 León

The coat of arms of the Spanish autonomous community of Castile and León depicts the traditional arms of Castile (the yellow castle) quartered with the arms of León (the purple lion). It is topped with a royal crown.

The lion design is attributed to Alfonso VII, who became king of Castile and León in 1126. The castle symbol is attributed to his grandson Alfonso VIII, In 1230, Ferdinand III united the two kingdoms and quartered the arms as a symbol of the union. Until the sixteenth century, a full castle, with walls and three towers, rather than the current town design, was used. Like Lyon in France, the name of the city of León has no link with the animal lion, as it comes from the Latin word legio (legion).

Its original elements are used not only in the current autonomous community of Castilla y León, but also in the national coat of arms of Spain, in municipal arms like the coat of arms of Toledo and in coats of arms of many former territories which belonged to the Crown of Castile, such as Jaén or Los Angeles, California.

It also appears on the Catholic diocese coat of arms of Diocese of St. Petersburg, the Archdiocese of Santa Fe, Diocese of St. Petersburg and the Roman Catholic Archdiocese of Manila.

== In history ==
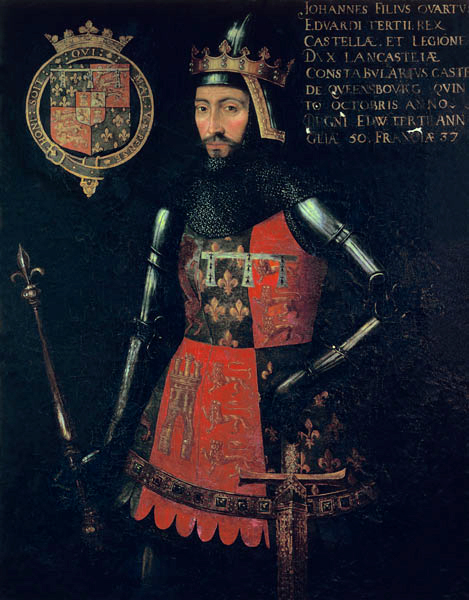
16th century retrospective portrait of John of Gaunt (1340–1399), who claimed the Crown of Castile

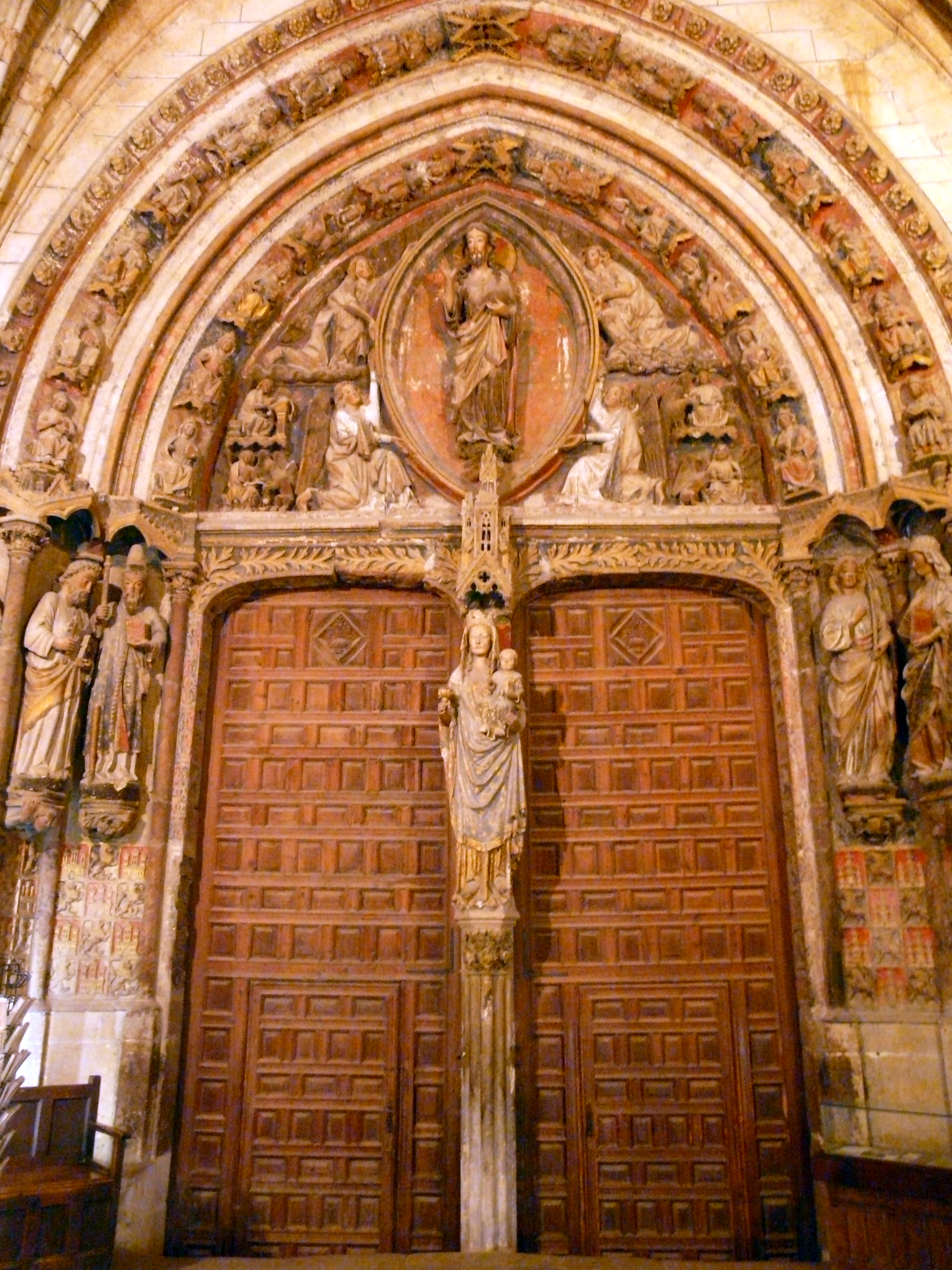
León Cathedral

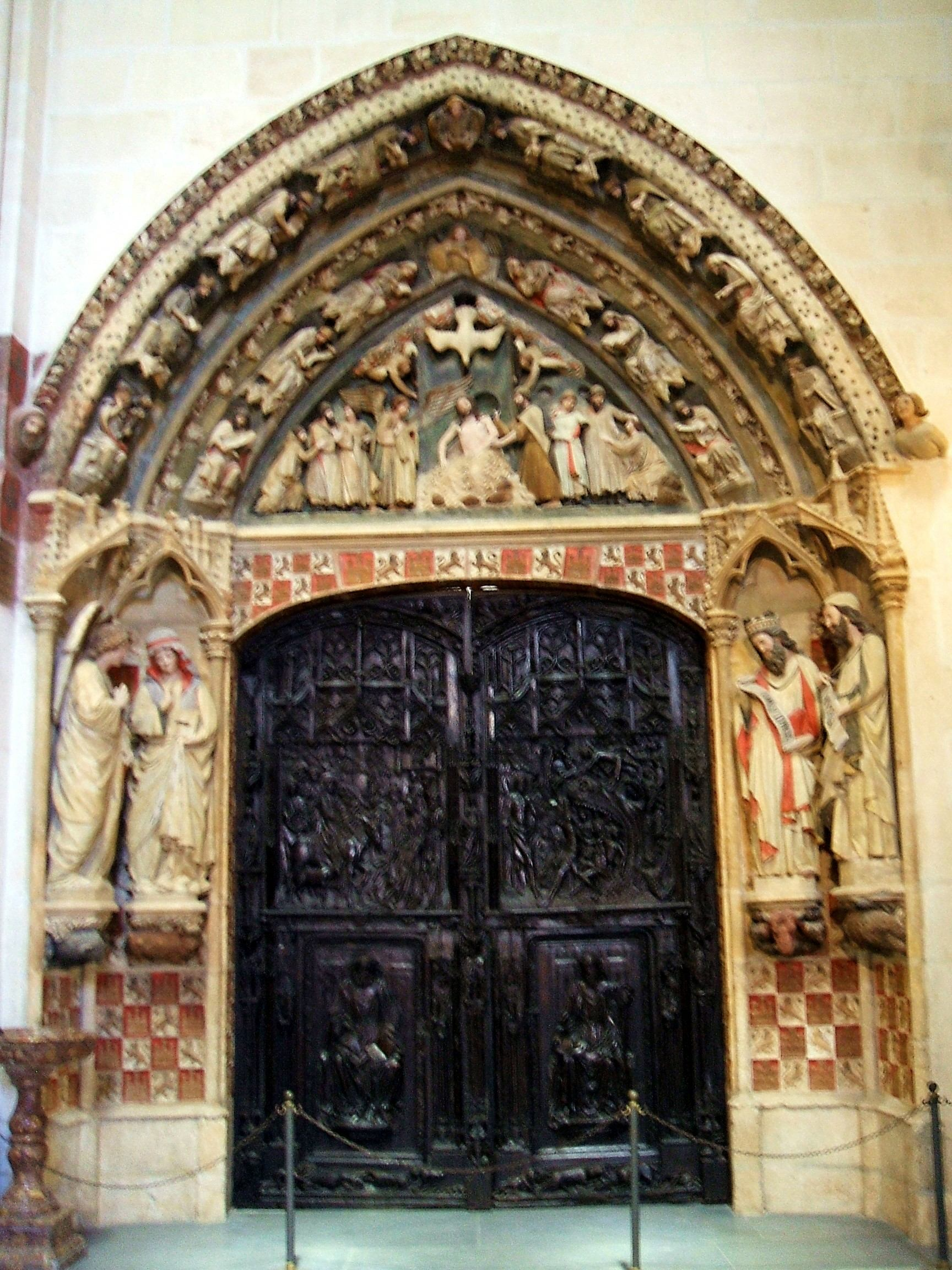
Burgos Cathedral

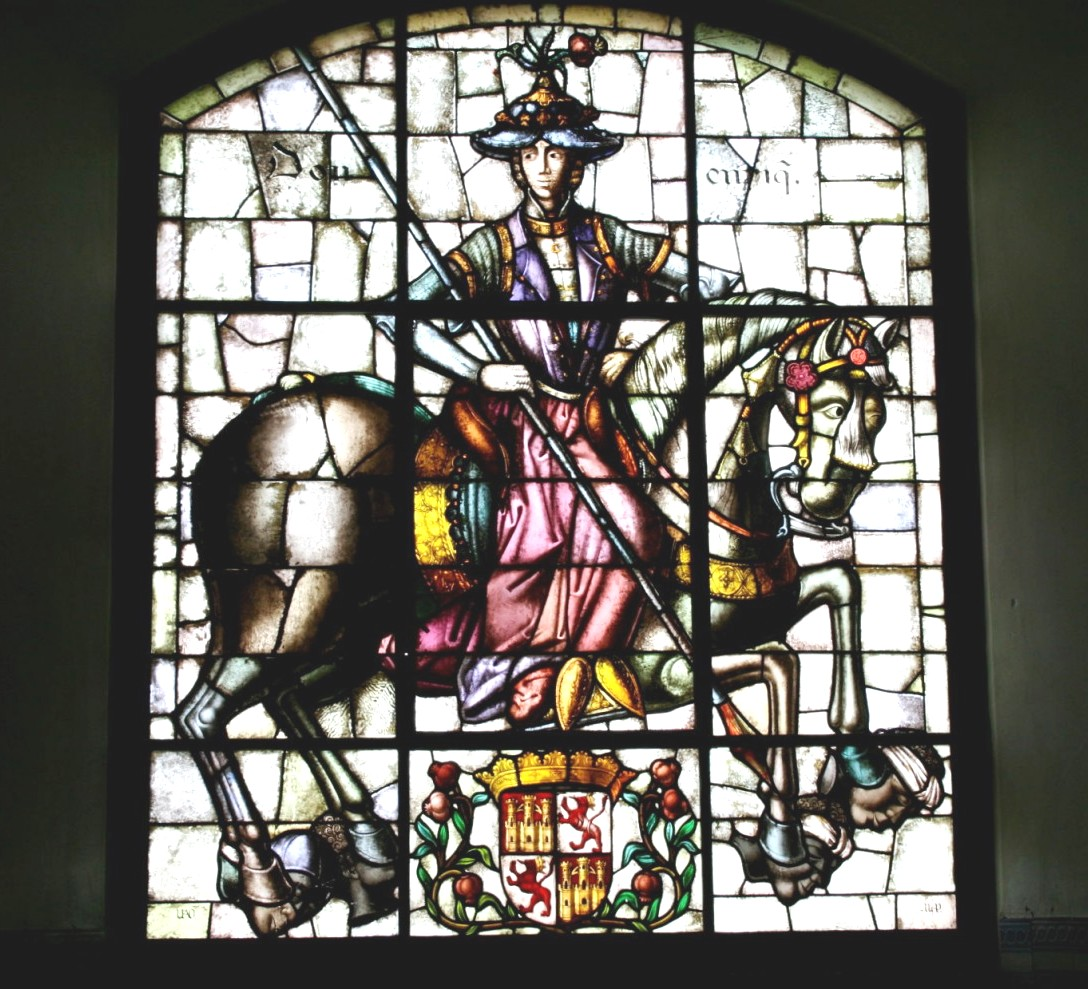
Alcázar of Segovia

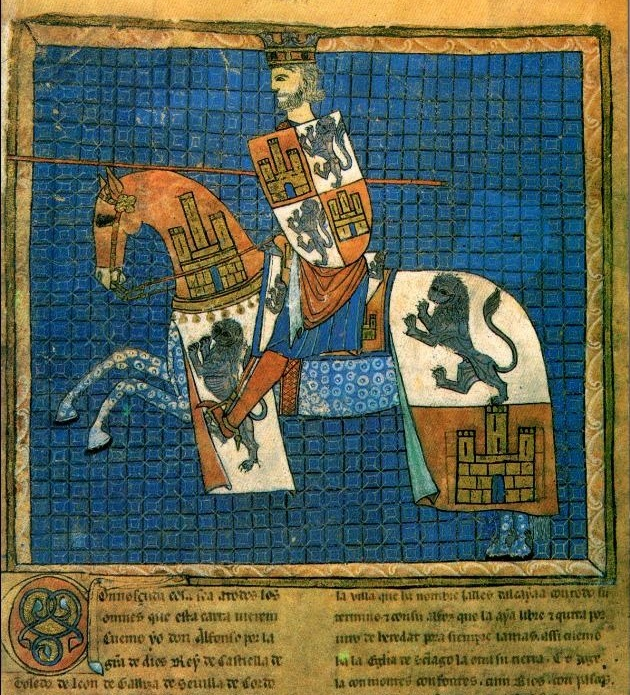
Alfonso X of Castile

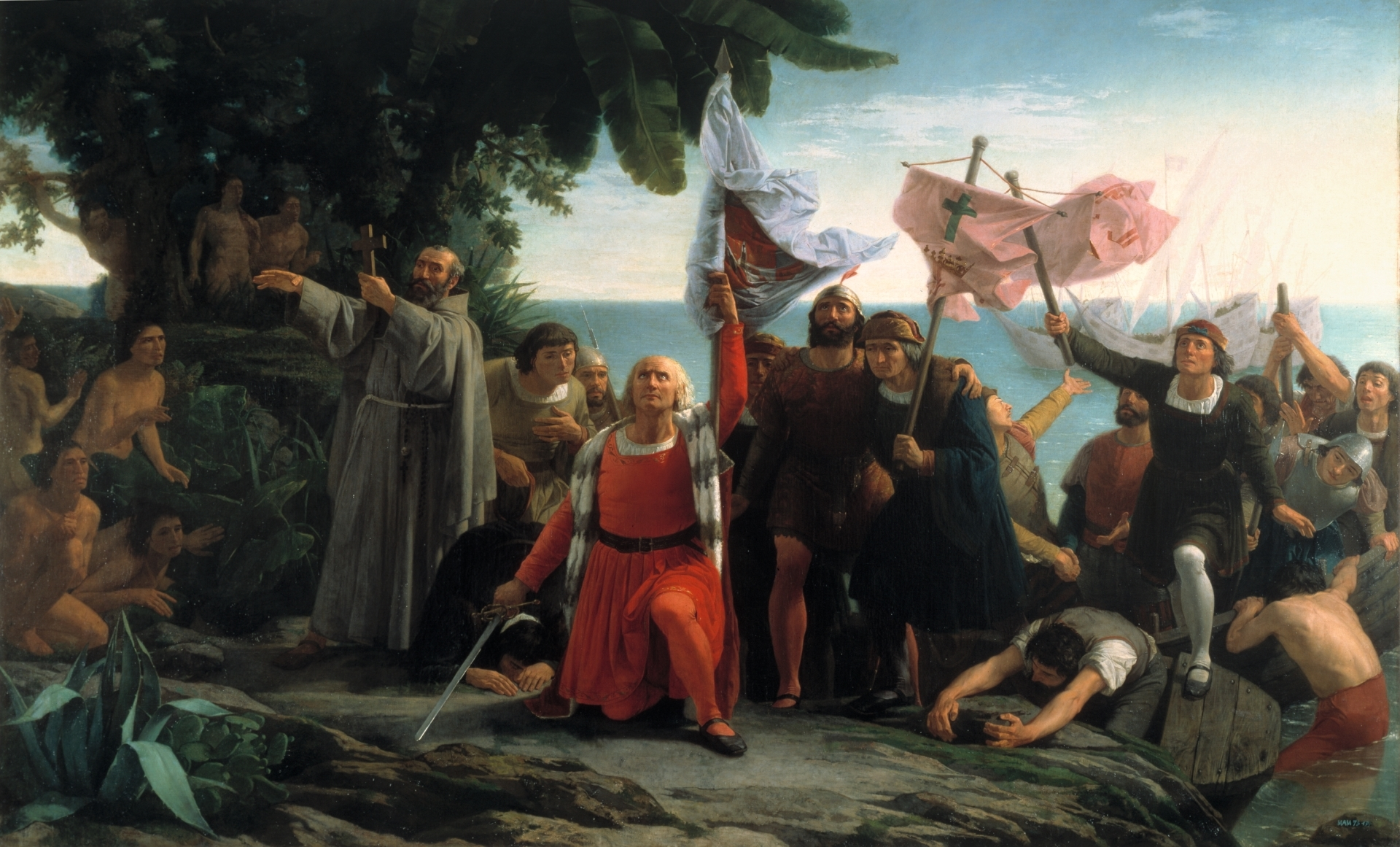
Cristopher Columbus landing for first time in America

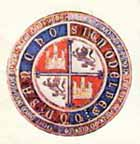
Seal of Sancho IV of Castile

== Castile and León autonomous community ==
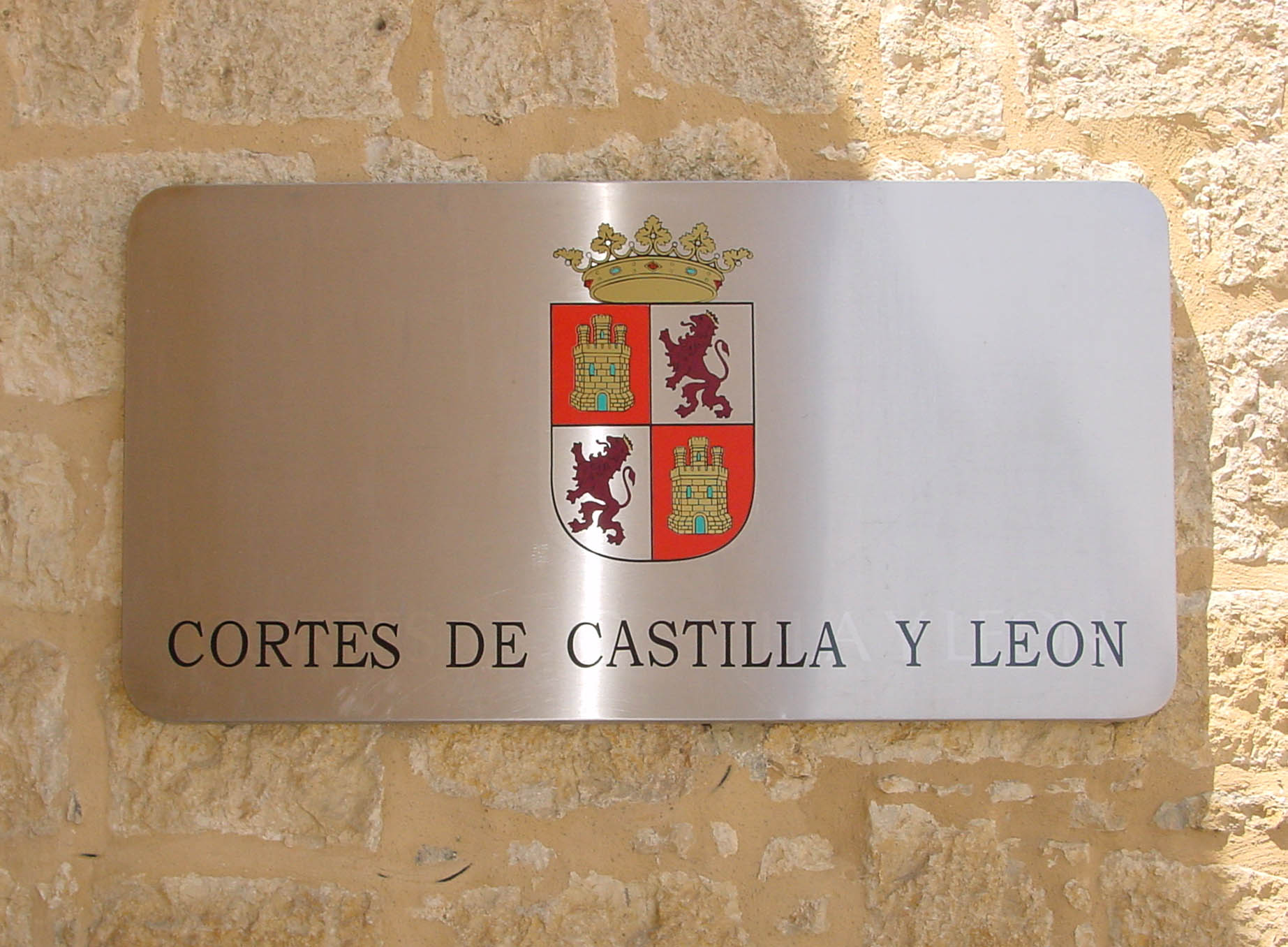
Coat of arms of Castile and Leon in Fuensaldaña castle, old head office of the Cortes of Castile and León

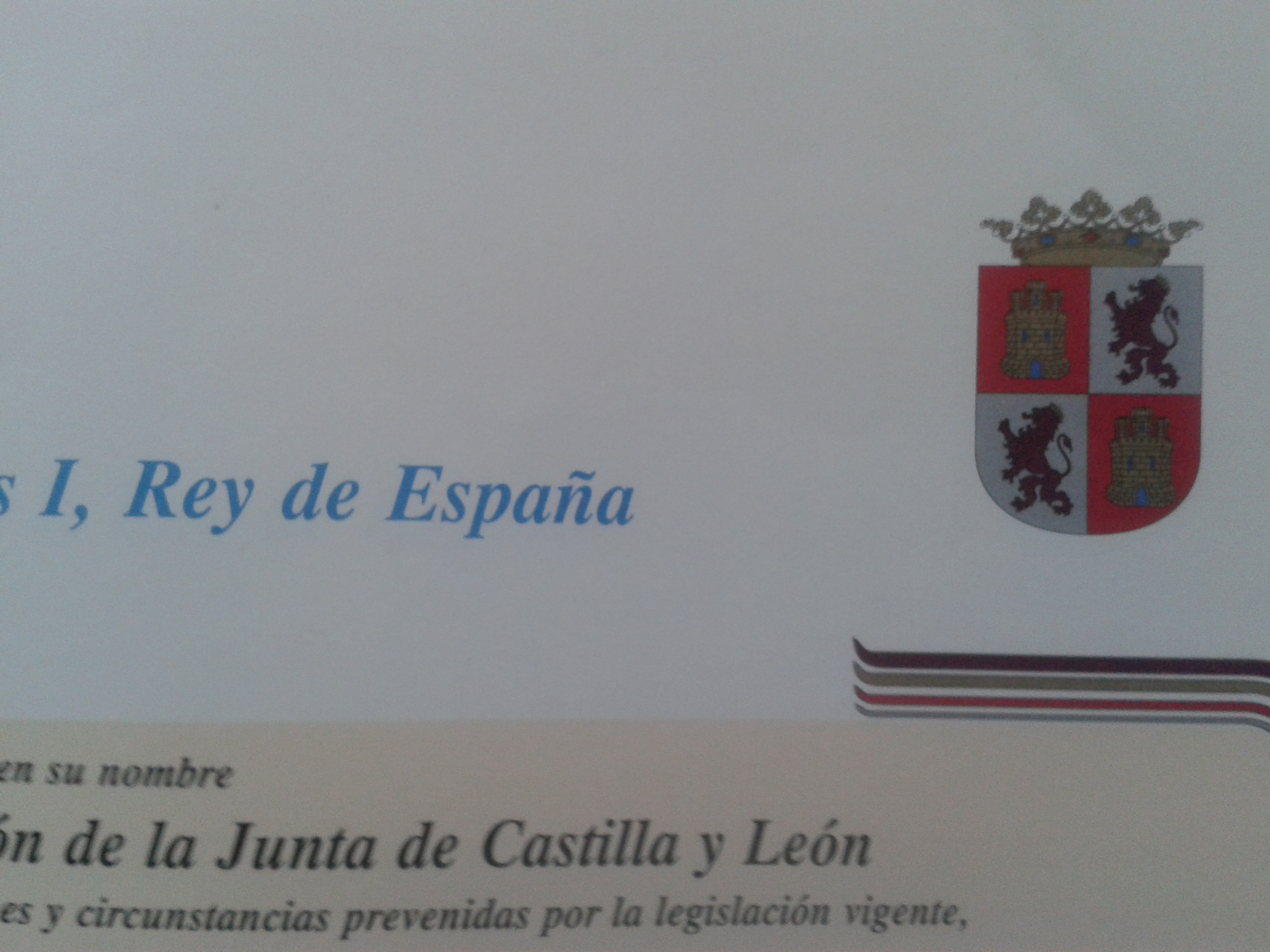
Coat of arms in a certificate of secondary studies issued by the regional government

== In the world ==
Coat of arms of Spain

Coat of arms of Melilla, Spain

Coat of arms of Ceuta, Spain

Coat of arms of Portugal

Coat of arms of Gibraltar

Coat of arms of Los Angeles, California

Seal of the governor of Alabama

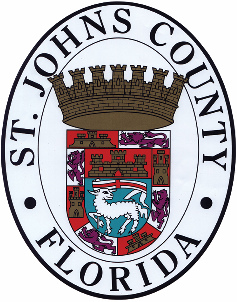
Seal of St. Johns County, Florida

Coat of arms of St. Augustine, Florida

Coat of arms of Puerto Rico

Coat of arms of Philippines

Coat of arms of Mexico City, Mexico

Coat of arms of Tabasco, Mexico

Coat of arms of Tlaxcala

Coat of arms of Panama City

Coat of arms of Carmen de Patagones, Argentina

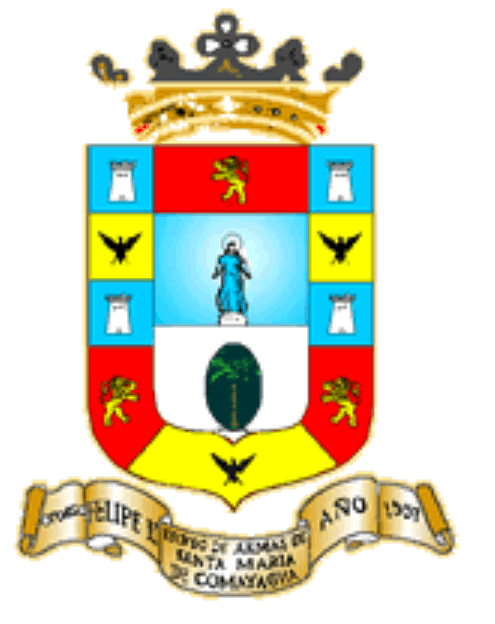
Coat of arms of Comayagua, Honduras

Coat of arms of Potosí, Bolivia

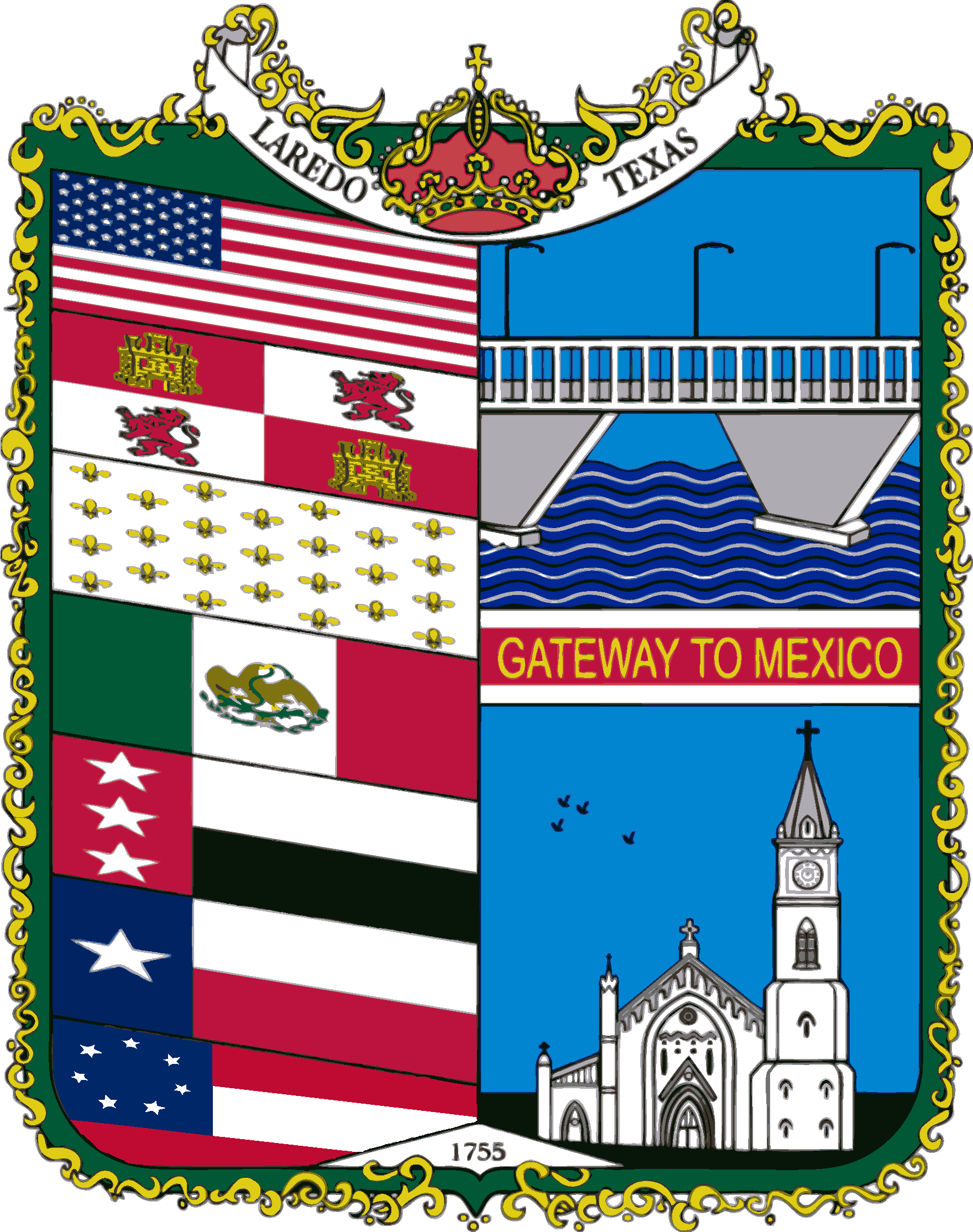
Coat of arms of Laredo, Texas

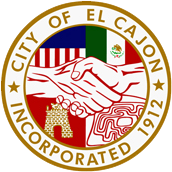
Seal of El Cajon

== See also ==
- Flag of Castile and León
- Heraldry of Castile
- Heraldry of León
