= Heraldry of Castile =

Heraldry of the Iberian kingdom

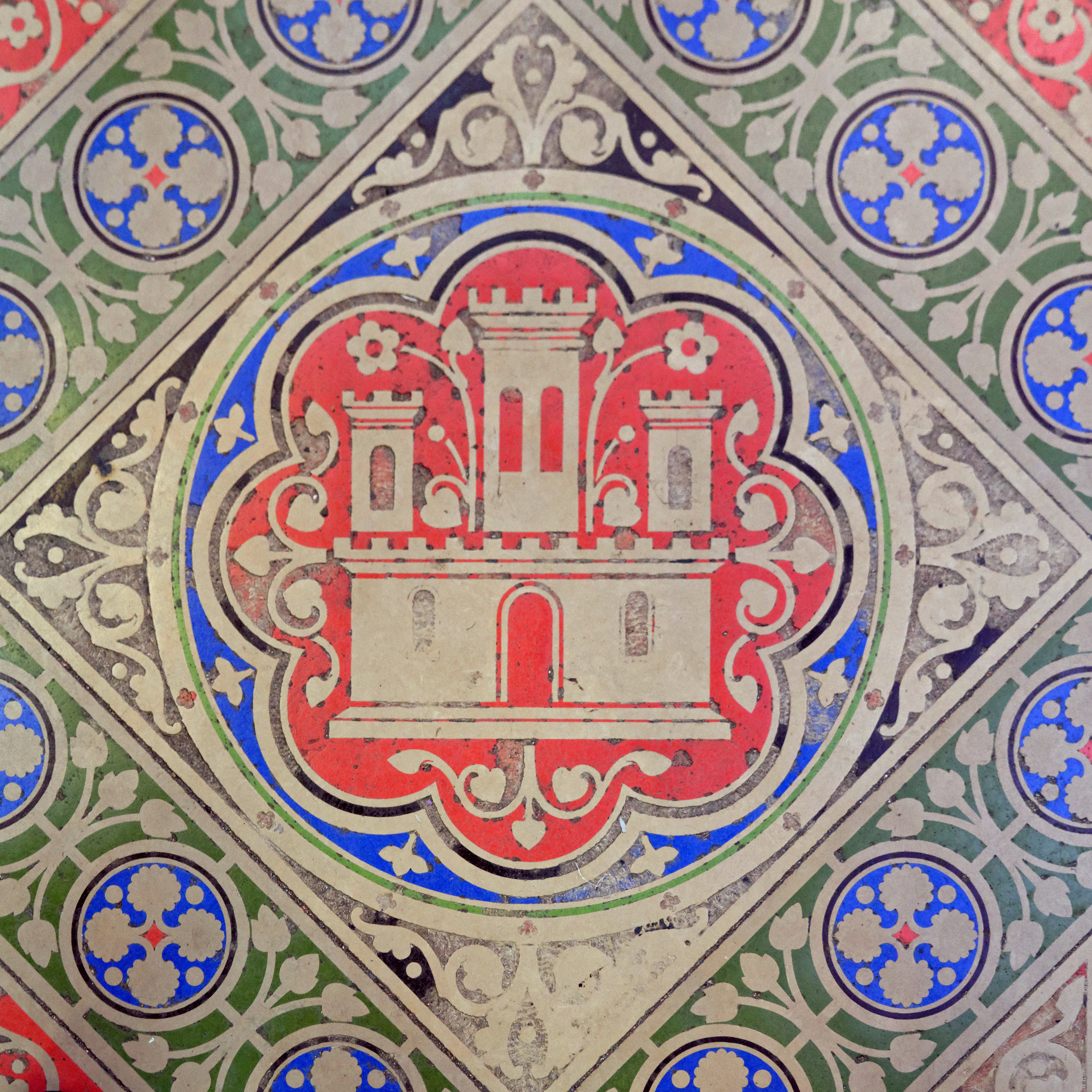
The heraldic castle of Castile in homage to Queen Blanche (Sainte-Chapelle, Paris)

The coat of arms of Castile was the heraldic emblem of its monarchs. Historian Michel Pastoureau says that the original purpose of heraldic emblems and seals was to facilitate the exercise of power and the identification of the ruler, due to what they offered for achieving these aims. These symbols were associated with the kingdom, and eventually also represented the intangible nature of the national sentiment or sense of belonging to a territory.

The blazon of the arms of Castile is:

Gules a triple-towered castle Or masoned Sable and ajoure Azure.

== Origin ==
The Royal Arms of Castile was first adopted at the start of the age of heraldry (circa 1175), that spread across Europe during the next century. The Spanish heraldist Faustino Menéndez Pidal de Navascués wrote that there is no evidence that there was a consolidated Castilian emblem before the reign of King Alfonso VIII or that these arms had pre-heraldic history as the heraldry of León.

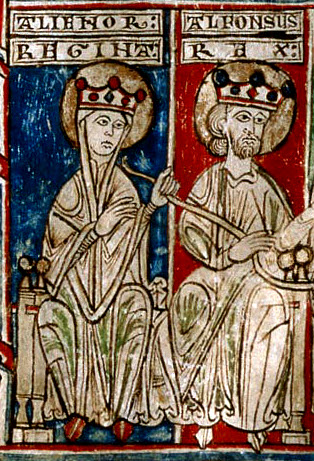
Miniature depicting King Alfonso VIII of Castile, that adopted a castle as device, and his wife Eleanor of England

The chancery of Alfonso VIII adopted a Signum Regis (seal) in 1165. This device had wheel shape, a defining characteristic of the chancery of monarchs of Castile since 1157. This author has pointed out that the emergence of the castle device Castile was similar to that of the Leonese lion but at a more accelerated pace. One of the earliest known testimonies documenting the origin of the castle emblem was carried out by bishop Lucas de Tuy. In Castile, the first examples of the castle as heraldic symbols have been found on the reverse of pendent seals, as was common at the time. The Signum Regis of King Alfonso VIII does not always depict a castle. Alfonso initially used a seal with a cross and a staff. By the year 1163 a single side with an equestrian image of Alfonso VIII holding a lance without a standard was used; this element allowed the determination of the royal device used at that time. Later seals continued to depict equestrian images as their central motif. The castle appeared for the first time on the reverse of pendent seals. The first preserved seal impression with the castle dates from 1176, contained in a document located in the Toledo Cathedral. The matrix of this seal dates back before 1171, as indicated by its typology. According to Faustino Menéndez Pidal de Navascués it is likely that the device of the castle was adopted in 1169, when Alfonso VIII came of age at age fourteen. The castle was adopted with a clear territorial connotation, a clear example of canting arms. This decision may have been motivated by a desire to claim the sovereignty of the Castilian monarch over the Kingdom of León.

The castle from its inception has retained a basic design - three towers, higher the central than lateral ones - suggesting that it is a native innovation, different from that existing in Central Europe.

Concerning the colours of the arms (tincture according to heraldry), the combination of "Or on a Gules field", was already fixed at least since the reign of King Ferdinand III, who was known as the Saint. This selection was indicated by the heraldry of the consort of the King Alfonso VIII, Queen Eleanor of England, daughter of Henry II, King of England. The arms used by the Queen were the Royal Arms of England, three identical gold lions (also known as leopards) with blue tongues and claws, walking past but facing the observer, arranged in a column on a red background. Although the tincture "azure" of tongue and claws is not cited in many blazons, they are historically a distinguishing feature of the Arms of England. These arms, which are one of the oldest heraldic emblems, were easily recognisable at a distance.

This hypothesis is reinforced by the fact that the marriage of Alfonso VIII and Eleanor was celebrated from 1170 to 1176, immediately prior to the adoption of the emblem according to preserved sources. Faustino Menéndez Pidal de Navascués defends as another possible reason for this combination of colors for appearing more frequently in the arms. The selection of the third colour, shown in the door and windows, Azure (blue) could be due to the contrast with the other two, or to the fact that it was the third most commonly used colour after the previous.

In the Reign of Alfonso VIII it was usual for the castle emblem to be presented as a device and not in an escutcheon. This devic can be seene on the tomb of Alfonso VIII and Queen Eleanor, in the Abbey of Santa María la Real de Las Huelgas (Burgos). The grave is decorated with the device of the castle and the English arms shown in a shield. The castle, as a device and not as part of an escutcheon, appears in all Castilian coins of the time. Castle devices placed in rows have been found on two stoles embroidered by Queen Eleanor from 1197 to 1198. One of the first representations of the castle emblem in an escutcheon has been displayed on a green brocade removed from the tomb of King Alfonso VIII.

== Propagation ==
=== France ===
Arms of Robert I, Count of Artois

Arms of Alphonse, Count of Poitiers

Arms of Charles I of Anjou
(until 1246)

Arms of Louis II d'Évreux, Count of Étampes

Arms of Robert of Alençon, Count of Perche

Arms of Alphonso of Brienne

=== Portugal ===
Arms of Infante Fernando of Portugal, Lord of Serpa

Arms of Infante Afonso of Portugal, Lord of Portalegre

Arms of Infanta Branca of Portugal, Viscountess of Huelgas and Lady of Cifuentes

Arms of Afonso Sanches, Lord of Albuquerque

Arms of Beatrice of Portugal
(As disputed Queen of Portugal)

Armorial achievement of the Portuguese Republic

Alfonso VIII's male issue did not survive him. Despite this, the Royal Arms of Castile was spread though female lineage into royal insignia used in Portugal, Aragon and France.

The Castilian arms were present in the heraldry of all the grandchildren of Alfonso VIII, except Kings Louis IX of France and Sancho II of Portugal that, as reigning monarchs, used their respective "arms of dominion". Castles Or on field Gules were included on the shields of the children of Louis VIII of France and Queen Blanche, also depicted on the tomb of other maternal grandson of Alfonso VIII, Infante Alfonso of Aragon (1222-1260), the eldest son of James I of Aragon and Queen Eleanor, decorated with the four pallets Gules and differenced with a bordure charged with twenty escutcheons Gules with castles. But one of the most prominent example occurred in Portugal, when Afonso III added a bordure Gules charged with castles to the royal arms and remaining these until 1910, when the country became a republic. Since 1911 the bordure with castles have continued as part of the national coat of arms of Portugal. A variant of the arms is used as the coat of arms of Ceuta in a nod of its history as a former Portuguese colony.

== Quartering with the arms of León ==
1230-1284

1281-1383

1383-1390

1390-1406

c. 1400 – c. 1500

c. 1500-1715

When his father, Alfonso IX, died in 1230, King Ferdinand III of Castile received the Kingdom of León and united the two kingdoms. The King wanted to symbolize the union for the first time, quartering the Castilian and Leonese arms, giving the arms of Castile pride of place. His aim was to have a device that reflects an indivisible union of kingdoms due to of the transitory symbolism of the impalement and secondary of the bordure. This method, very widespread spread in the Heraldry of different countries, was soon followed successfully throughout Europe. In the middle of the 12th century quarterings were used by monarchs of Aragon-Sicily, Brabant and others like the Kings of England, Navarre or Bohemia adopted it during the next century. John I of Castile impaled the Castilian quartering with the arms of Portugal as pretender to the throne of that kingdom. The Royal Arms of Castile quartered with the Leonese ones were borne by the Castilian monarchs until the reign of the Catholic Monarchs. The quartering was remained as symbol associated with the Crown of Castile territory until the promulgation of the Nueva Planta decrees by Philip V in 1715.

== Hispanic Monarchy and current uses ==
Coat of arms of the Catholic Monarchs.

In 1475, Isabella of Castile and Ferdinand II of Aragon joined the arms of the Crowns of Castile and Aragon in a quarterly shield. It followed the method created by Fernando III and giving the arms of Castile pride of place again. A series of dynastic marriages enabled the House of Habsburg to occupy the thrones of Castile, Aragon and Navarre, the arms of Castile have appeared in the arms of all Spanish monarchs and, since 1869 when was adopted, in all versions of the national coat of arms. As above, in all these cases giving the Castilian arms pride of place.

=== In Spain ===
Leaving aside the Spanish local and provincial heraldry, where can be found numerous examples and being the most prominent the coat of arms of Toledo, the Castilian arms are among the elements of the coats of arms of the autonomous communities (regions) of Castile and León (which has adopted the quartering of Ferdinand III), La Rioja, Castile-La Mancha, Extremadura, Madrid, Murcia and within the bordure of the autonomous city of Melilla.

Coat of arms of Castile and León

Coat of arms of Castile–La Mancha

Coat of arms of the Community of Madrid

Coat of arms of the
Region of Murcia

Coat of arms of Extremadura

Coat of arms of Melilla

Coat of arms of Toledo

=== In former overseas territories ===
Outside the Iberian Peninsula, the castle of Castile is depicted in the arms granted to capitals of the Spanish Empire, as is the case of the capital of Ecuador San Francisco de Quito, with a triple-towered castle Argent and two eagles Sable on field Gules. It was granted to Quito by King Charles I (Charles V as Holy Roman Emperor), in 1541. Even older, the coat of arms of Puerto Rico was granted by the Spanish Crown on November 8, 1511, making it the oldest heraldic achievement still currently in use in the Americas.

Coat of arms of Puerto Rico

Coat of arms of Quito

== Crest and supporters ==
Castilian armorial achievement with the Royal Crest (After the union with León)

The Royal Crest of Castile, also called Crest of the Castle and the Lion, was it that used the last monarchs of Castile and Spain until the 19th century. This crest consisted of a castle or fortress with nascent lion on top. These two figures are charges of the Royal arms of the former Crown of Castile. King John II (1406–1454) adopted this crest was, its use is documented in ten and twenty doblas coins, minted in the city of Seville. According to historian José María de Francisco Olmos in his study of the late medieval Castilian currency, the obverse of these coins are represented a shield with the Device of the Bend and the Castilian Royal Crest. In the same study, the author recalls that the Crest of the Castle and the Lion is also represented at an image of King John II, an equestrian portrait of the Armorial of the Golden Fleece, preserved in the Bibliothèque de l'Arsenal (Paris).

Faustino Menéndez Pidal de Navascués noted that, previously, the Castilian monarchs had used a crest, consisting of the figure of a nascent griffin Or. This crest, reproduced in the Armorial de Gelre (folio page 60v), was used by Henry II, John I and Henry III. After the reign of the Catholic Monarchs, there is evidence of its usage by Philip I in some versions of his achievement adopted as King jure uxoris of Castile. There are two prominent examples in his seal and the book of the Order of the Golden Fleece, illustrated by Simon Bening. The achievement of King Philip I was reproduced in this book due his status as sovereign and grand master of this order.

The Spanish monarchs of the House of Habsburg also maintained the royal crest in their achievement. At the beginning of the 16th century the lion of the crest, crowned, began to hold a sword and a globus cruciger. Philip II and Philip III added two crowned helmets with nascent dragons, the crests of the Portuguese and Aragonese monarchs; besides, it gave the crest and arms of Castile pride of place (the central position). This achievement is placed above the bronze figures, portrait of the family of Philip II, by the Milanese sculptor Pompeo Leoni (1533-1608), son of Leone Leoni, that are located in the interior of the Basilica of El Escorial (Madrid).

Because of Spanish monarchs gave the Castilian quarters pride of place in their arms, the Royal Crest of Castile remained as single crest at their armorial achievement. Both latest versions of the armorial achievement of Spain with the royal crest, adopted by Philip V and his son Charles III, showed the lion of the crest with a modern royal crown (with eight half arches) and a scroll charged with the battle cry Santiago!. The meaning of the phrase is to praise St. James the apostle, patron saint of Spain. At that time, it was usual to consider the Royal Crest of Castile as the crest of the whole of Spain, thus it was exposed by heraldists as José de Avilés e Iturbide, 1st Marquis of Avilés, in his book Ciencia heroyca. Since the 18th century, full royal armorial achievements were used occasionally and the crest of the Castle and lion practically fell into disuse until its demise in 1975, when the Spanish monarchy was restored.

In heraldry, supporters are figures or objects usually placed on either side of the shield and depicted holding it up, first appeared in English heraldry in the 15th century. Originally, they were not regarded as an integral part of arms, and were subject to frequent change. Lions were sporadically shown supporting the arms of the Castilian monarch and were introduced by John II. The lions as supporters were displayed until the reign of Philip V and, after 1868, in some ornate versions of the national arms of Spain.

Coat of Arms of John II and Henry IV with Supporters

The arms of the Crown of Castile with the ancient royal crest

The Castilian arms with the Crest of the Castle and the Lion. During the reign of John II the royal crest was represented over the Device of the Bend depicted on a shield

Full Ornamented Coat of Arms of Spanish House of Austria (1580-1668). For more see here.

Full armorial achievement of the Monarch of Spain since Charles III with the Crest of the Castle and the Lion

== Castilian flags ==
As it was quite usual during the Middle Ages many flags, banners and standards were not standardized. There has never been a Castilian royal standard or banner with a unique design. There were varied designs of the castle or colours of the fabric, depending on the artisan or prevailing fashion. They have their origin in the representation of the arms of the Castilian monarch on cloth to be used as flag and, by extension were emblem of the Kingdom and the Historic Region of Castile. The field Gules was represented in more or less dark reddish tones, although a more specific colour, crimson, has been used very frequently in Castile.

Royal Standard of the Kingdom of Castile

Royal Standard of the Kingdom of Castile
(Variant)

Royal Standard of the Crown of Castile
(14th century)

Royal Standard of the Crown of Castile
(15th century)

Royal Standard of the Crown of Castile. Square Shape
(15th century)

Royal Standard of the Crown of Castile
(ca.1500-1715)

Flag of the Autonomous Community of
Castile and León
(1983-)

Flag of the Autonomous Community of
Castile-La Mancha
(1986-)

A triple-towered castle on red or crimson fabric has shown in standards used by Castilian monarchs. The quartering of Ferdinand III was also displayed on his standard and it has served as the basis for current flags of autonomous communities of Castile and León and Castile-La Mancha. Further confusions led to apply the colour purple to a legendary «Castilian banner» (which neither preserved nor has never been documented), identifying the color purple as symbol of the Kingdom of Castile, something that influenced in the flag of the Second Spanish Republic and its lowest band. There are different hypotheses to explain the origin of the confusion. Fundamentally, the origin part of chromatic colour relationship among purple and red/crimson. Colour crimson was also widely used to represent the color purple, used in the ancient world as symbol of the sovereignty and authority of monarchs. One of the assumptions made is supported by the fact that with the passage of time many cloths, that originally were crimson, worn may become confused with other tones, as the purple. These inaccuracies were the creation of a legend on the purple colour of the banner used during the Revolt of the Comuneros against King Charles I of Castile and Aragon (later Holy Roman Emperor Charles V), between 1520 and 1521. Nowadays Castilian nationalism movement uses a purple flag charged with the triple-towered castle in the center and Castilian Leftist groups included the castle within a red star.

A Modern Interpretation. Colour Crimson
(Unofficial)

Another Modern Interpretation. Colour Red
(Unofficial)

Flag used by Castilian Nationalists
(Unofficial)

Flag used by Castilian Leftist Groups
(Unofficial)

== See also ==
- Royal Bend of Castile, guidon of the monarch of the Crown of Castile
- Castile
- Old Castile and New Castile
- Crown of Castile
- Kingdom of Castile
- Castilianism
- Coat of arms of Castile and León
- Coat of arms of Spain
- Coat of arms of Portugal
- Royal Arms of England
- Flag of Castile and León
- Quartering (heraldry)
- Heraldry of León
- Spanish heraldry

== Sources ==
- Menéndez Pidal de Navascués, Faustino (1999). "El escudo" [The coat of arms]. Símbolos de España [Symbols of Spain]. Menéndez Pidal y Navascués, Faustino; O´Donnell, Hugo; Lolo, Begoña. Madrid: Centro de Estudios Políticos y Constitucionales. ISBN 84-259-1074-9.
- Menéndez-Pidal de Navascués, Faustino (2004) El Escudo de España [The coat of arms of Spain], Real Academia Matritense de Heráldica y Genealogía, Madrid. PP. 64–78. ISBN 84-88833-02-4
