= Armorial of Spanish monarchs in Italy =

The Spanish monarchs of the House of Habsburg and Philip V used separate versions of their royal arms as sovereigns of the Kingdom of Naples-Sicily, Sardinia and the Duchy of Milan with the arms of these territories.

== Introduction ==
The Kingdom of Sicily was ruled as an independent kingdom by relatives or cadet branch of the house of Aragon until 1409 and thence as part of the Crown of Aragon. The Kingdom of Naples was ruled by the Angevin ruler René of Anjou until the two thrones were reunited by Alfonso V of Aragon, after the successful siege of Naples and the defeat of René on 6 June 1443. Eventually, Alfonso of Aragon divided the two kingdoms during his rule. He gave the rule of Naples to his illegitimate son Ferdinand I of Naples, who ruled from 1458 to 1494, and Aragon and Sicily to Alfonso's brother John II of Aragon. Eventually the Kingdom of Naples was reunited with the Aragonese Kingdom.The titles were held by the Aragonese kings of the Aragonese Crown until 1516, followed by the Kings of Spain until the end of the Spanish branch of the House of Habsburg in 1700.

When Francesco II Sforza, duke of Milan died without heirs in 1535, emperor Charles V got the Duchy. The Emperor held the Duchy throughout, eventually investing it on his son prince Philip. The possession of the Duchy by Spain was finally recognized by the French in the Treaty of Cateau-Cambrésis in 1559.

- The Royal Arms of Sicily after 1282 were blazoned Per saltire Aragon and Hohenstaufen: 1/4 are the arms of Aragon (Or, four pales Gules), and 2/3 are the arms of the House of Hohenstaufen (Argent, an eagle Sable).
- The Royal Arms of Naples used by the monarchs of the House of Trastámara were borne by Charles III of Naples as his heirs: the arms of Hungary (Barry of eight Gules and Argent), the arms of the Kingdom of Jerusalem (Argent, the Jerusalem Cross Or) and the ancient arms of Anjou (Azure semé-de-lys Or charged with a label of three points Gules). In 1504 Ferdinand II of Aragon became monarch of Naples and added the arms of Charles III in his heraldry but he removed the arms of Anjou.
- The Ducal Arms of Milan (used at the time of the House of Sforza) were the biscione, a heraldic charge showing on Argent an Azure serpent in the act of consuming a human quartering, with the Imperial eagle (the earlier single-headed).

The Kingdom of Naples-Sicily and the Duchy of Milan remained in Spanish hands until the War of the Spanish Succession in the early 18th century, when Milan was conquered by the Austrians and Naples-Sicily passed to the House of Savoy.

== Gallery ==
Italian version of the arms of Charles I of Spain (Charles V as Holy Roman Emperor)
Coat of Arms	Dates	Details
	Charles I Charles V as King of the Romans, of Aragon and Both Sicilies; 1516–1519	Heraldic Divisions: Crown of Castile (Arms of Castile and León); Crown of Aragon; Kingdom of Naples (Arms of Kingdom of Jerusalem and Kingdom de Hungary); Kingdom of Sicily; Kingdom of Granada (enté en point) / Archduchy of Austria (Lower inescutcheon and supporter by Double-headed eagle); Other elements The Royal open crown of the Kingdom of Aragon
	Charles I Charles V as Holy Roman Emperor; 1520–1556	Heraldic Divisions: Crown of Castile (Arms of Castile and León, Granada enté en point); Crown of Aragon; Kingdom of Navarre; Kingdom of Sicily / Archduchy of Austria; Duchy of Burgundy (Modern arms); Duchy of Burgundy (Ancient arms); Duchy of Brabant; Duchy of Flanders and Tirol (Lower inescutcheon); Kingdom of Jerusalem; Kingdom of Hungary; Granada (Enté en point); Other elements The double-headed eagle of the Holy Roman Empire, the heraldic imperial crown

Versions of the Spanish Royal Arms used by the Monarch as Sovereign of Naples and Sicily
Coat of Arms	Dates and Monarch	Details
	Philip of Spain; Prince of Asturias and Girona; 1554–1556; Philip II; 1556–1598	Heraldic Divisions: Crown of Castile (Arms of Castile and León, Granada enté en point); Crown of Aragon; Kingdom of Jerusalem; Kingdom of Hungary; Kingdom of Sicily / Archduchy of Austria; Duchy of Burgundy (Modern arms); Duchy of Burgundy (Ancient arms); Duchy of Brabant; Duchy of Flanders and Tirol (Lower inescutcheon); Heraldic Ornaments; The open royal crown of Naples and Sicily, the collar of the Order of the Golden Fleece
	Philip III; 1598–1621; Philip IV; 1621–1665	Heraldic Divisions: Crown of Castile (Arms of Castile and León); Crown of Aragon; Kingdom of Jerusalem / Archduchy of Austria; Duchy of Burgundy (Modern arms); Duchy of Burgundy (Ancient arms); Duchy of Brabant; Kingdom of Sicily; Kingdom of Hungary; Heraldic Ornaments; Open royal crown of Naples and Sicily
	Charles II; 1665–1700	Heraldic Divisions: Crown of Castile (Arms of Castile and León); Crown of Aragon; Kingdom of Jerusalem / Archduchy of Austria; Duchy of Burgundy (Modern arms); Duchy of Burgundy (Ancient arms); Duchy of Brabant; Kingdom of Sicily; Kingdom of Hungary; Inescutcheon: Duchy of Flanders; Tirol; Heraldic Ornaments; The closed royal crown of Naples and Sicily, the collar of the Order of the Golden Fleece
	Philip V 1700–1713	Heraldic Divisions: Kingdom of Castile; Crown of Aragon; Kingdom of León / Duchy of Burgundy (Modern arms); Kingdom of Sicily; Inescutcheon: Kingdom of Jerusalem; Heraldic Ornaments; The closed royal crown of Naples and Sicily, the collar of the Order of the Golden Fleece

Version of the Spanish Royal Arms used by the Monarch as Sovereign of Sicily
Coat of Arms	Dates	Details
	Philip II; 1580–1598; Philip I, as King of Portugal; 1580–1598; Philip III/II; 1598–1621; Philip IV; 1621–1665; Philip III as King of Portugal; 1621–1640; Charles II; 1665–1700	Heraldic Divisions: Crown of Castile (Arms of Castile and León); Crown of Aragon; Kingdom of Sicily; Kingdom of Jerusalem; Kingdom of Granada (enté en point); Kingdom of Portugal (Upper inescutcheon) / Archduchy of Austria; Duchy of Burgundy (Modern arms); Duchy of Burgundy (Ancient arms); Duchy of Brabant; Duchy of Flanders and Tirol (Lower inescutcheon); Other elements An heraldic eagle as supporter, the open royal crown of Naples and Sicily and the collar of the Order of the Golden Fleece
	Philip V 1700–1713	Heraldic Divisions: Crown of Castile (Arms of Castile and León); Crown of Aragon; Kingdom of Sicily; Archduchy of Austria / Duchy of Burgundy (Modern arms); Duchy of Burgundy (Ancient arms); Duchy of Brabant; Duchy of Flanders and Tirol (enté en point); Inescutcheon: Duchy of Anjou (Dynastic arms of the Reigning House); Other elements An heraldic eagle as supporter, the open royal crown of Naples and Sicily, the collar of the Order of the Golden Fleece and the badge of the Order of the Holy Spirit

Versions of the Spanish Royal Arms used by the Monarch as Sovereign of Milan
Coat of Arms	Dates and Monarch	Details
	Philip of Spain; Prince of Asturias and Girona; 1554–1556; Philip II; 1556–1558; King jure uxoris of England and Ireland; 1554–1558	Heraldic Divisions: Dexter (To viewer's left): Crown of Castile (Arms of Castile and León); Crown of Aragon and Kingdom of Sicily; Kingdom of Granada (enté en point) / Archduchy of Austria; Duchy of Burgundy (Modern arms); Duchy of Burgundy (Ancient arms); Duchy of Brabant; Duchy of Flanders and Tirol (Lower inescutcheon); Sinister (To viewer's right): Kingdom of England; Kingdom of France (Modern); Inescutcheon: Duchy of Milan; Heraldic Ornaments; The open ducal crown of Milan, the collar of the Order of the Golden Fleece
	Philip II; 1558–1580	Heraldic Divisions: Dexter (To viewer's left): Crown of Castile (Arms of Castile and León); Crown of Aragon; Kingdom of Jerusalem; Kingdom of Hungary; Kingdom of Sicily / Archduchy of Austria; Duchy of Burgundy (Modern arms); Duchy of Burgundy (Ancient arms); Duchy of Brabant; Duchy of Flanders and Tirol (Lower inescutcheon); Sinister (To viewer's right): Duchy of Milan; Heraldic Ornaments; The open ducal crown of Milan, the collar of the Order of the Golden Fleece
	Philip II; 1580–1598; Philip I, as King of Portugal; 1580–1598; Philip III/II; 1598–1621; Philip IV; 1621–1665; Philip III as King of Portugal; 1621–1640; Charles II; 1665–1700	Heraldic Divisions: Crown of Castile (Arms of Castile and León); Crown of Aragon; Kingdom of Sicily; Kingdom of Granada (enté en point); Kingdom of Portugal (Upper inescutcheon) / Archduchy of Austria; Duchy of Burgundy (Modern arms); Duchy of Burgundy (Ancient arms); Duchy of Brabant; Duchy of Flanders and Tirol (Lower inescutcheon); Inescutcheon (Central): Duchy of Milan; Heraldic Ornaments; The closed ducal crown of Milan, the collar of the Order of the Golden Fleece
	Philip V 1700–1706/1713	Heraldic Divisions: Crown of Castile (Arms of Castile and León); Crown of Aragon; Kingdom of Sicily; Kingdom of Granada (enté en point); Duchy of Anjou (Upper inescutcheon) / Archduchy of Austria; Duchy of Burgundy (Modern arms); Duchy of Burgundy (Ancient arms); Duchy of Brabant; Duchy of Flanders and Tirol (Enté en point); Inescutcheon (Central): Duchy of Milan; Heraldic Ornaments; The closed ducal crown of Milan, the collar of the Order of the Golden Fleece

Versions of the Spanish Royal Arms used by the Monarch as Sovereign of Sardinia
Coat of Arms	Dates and Monarch	Details
	Philip I, II, III and Charles II as King of Sardinia; 1580–1700	Heraldic Divisions: Crown of Castile (Arms of Castile and León); Crown of Aragon; Kingdom of Sicily; Kingdom of Granada (enté en point); Kingdom of Portugal (Upper inescutcheon) / Archduchy of Austria; Duchy of Burgundy (Modern arms); Duchy of Burgundy (Ancient arms); Duchy of Brabant; Duchy of Flanders and Tirol (Lower inescutcheon); Inescutcheon Sinister (To viewer's right): Kingdom of Sardinia; Heraldic Ornaments; The closed royal crown of Aragon, the collar of the Order of the Golden Fleece

== See also ==
- Historical Spanish coats of arms
- Duchy of Milan
- Kingdom of Naples
- Kingdom of Sicily
- Monarchs of Spain
- Italian heraldry
- Spanish heraldry
