= Heraldry of León =

Coats of arms of the pre-modern Spanish kingdom

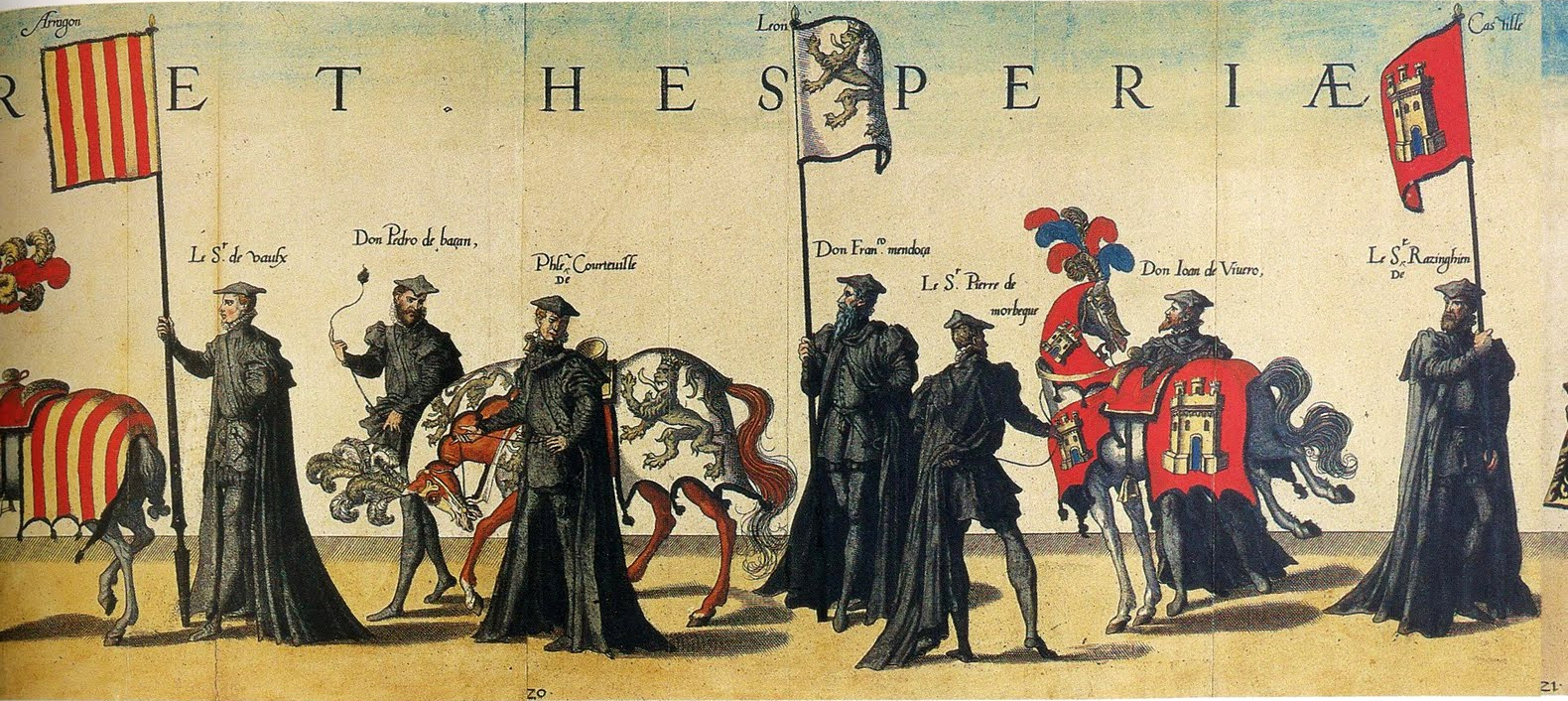
Banner and caparison with the arms of León (between Aragon and Castile) in the funeral obsequies of Charles V in Brussels, 29 December 1558, by Hieronymus Cock

The first instance of a figure of the lion as symbol of the Kingdom of León is found in minted coins of Alfonso VII, called the Emperor (1126–1157). Until then, the cross had a preponderant position on documents and coins of Leonese monarchs since that reign the cross was gradually displaced by the lion. The Spanish historian and heraldist Martín de Riquer explained that the lion was already used as heraldic emblem in 1148. At the end of the reign of Alfonso VII, the figure of this animal began to appear on royal documents as personal device of the monarch and became pervasive during reigns of Ferdinand II (1157-1188) and Alfonso IX (1188–1230).

The first reference to the lion as personal emblem of the monarch, and thus the kingdom, is found in Chronica Adefonsi imperatoris, from the time of Alfonso VII. When describing armies participating in the capture of Almería, the text says, translated literally:

... the select order of knights from León. Carrying banners, like lions they burst ... Like the lion it surpasses the other animals in beauty and in strength. Thus this city exceeds the other cities in honor. The golden insignia of the Emperor appears on its banners and on its arms. It is carried into battle as a protection against every evil.

The heraldic symbol of León is the prominent feature of flags of León, including the historical standards of the former Kingdom of León, the flags of the City of León and the Province of León, and others representing the region known as León or the Leonese Country.

== History ==
=== One of the earliest heraldic symbols in Europe ===
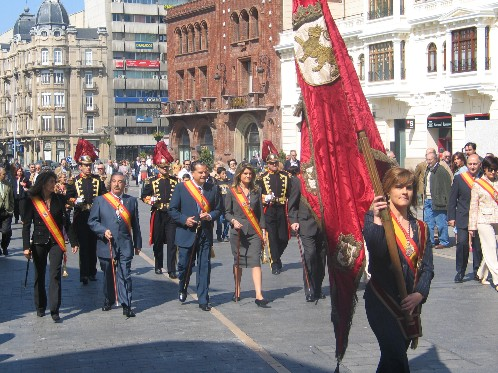
The Royal Standard of León preceding to the Council of the City, at the procession to Royal Collegiate of San Isidoro of the "Forum or Offer" Ceremony

The development of the modern heraldic language cannot be attributed to a single individual, time, or place. Although certain designs that are now considered heraldic were evidently in use during the eleventh century, most accounts and depictions of shields up to the beginning of the twelfth century contain little or no evidence of their heraldic character. For example, the Bayeux Tapestry, illustrating the Norman invasion of England in 1066, and probably commissioned about 1077, when the cathedral of Bayeux was rebuilt, (Note: This was undertaken by Odo, Bishop of Bayeux, and half-brother of William I, whose conquest of England is commemorated by the tapestry.) depicts a number of shields of various shapes and designs, many of which are plain, while others are decorated with dragons, crosses, or other typically heraldic figures. Yet no individual is depicted twice bearing the same arms, nor are any of the descendants of the various persons depicted known to have borne devices resembling those in the tapestry.

The animals of the "barbarian" (Eurasian) predecessors of heraldic designs are likely to have been used as clan symbols. Adopted in Germanic tradition around the fifth century, they were re-interpreted in a Christian context in the western kingdoms of Gaul and Italy in the 6th and seventh centuries.

During the eleventh century, crosses appearing on seals of Spanish princes and were used for authentication privileges until King Alfonso VII started using a lion (1126), alluding to the name of his main realm lion (Spanish: león), an example of canting arms.

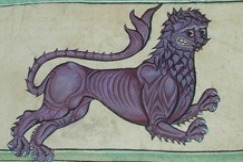
A lion passant purpure, device of Alfonso IX (Tumbo A).

The lion as a heraldic charge is present from the very earliest development of heraldry in the 12th century. One of the earliest known examples of armory as it subsequently came to be practiced decorates the tomb of Geoffrey Plantagenet, Count of Anjou, who died in 1151. An enamel, probably commissioned by Geoffrey's widow between 1155 and 1160, depicts him carrying a blue shield with golden lions rampant and wearing a blue helmet adorned with another lion. A chronicle dated to about 1175 states that Geoffrey was given a badge of a gold lion when he was knighted by his father-in-law, Henry I, in 1128.

Alfonso VII's use of the lion as a heraldic emblem for León predates the earliest surviving Royal Arms of England, a single lion visible on a half-shield depicted on the First Great Seal (1189) of Richard I, as well as the three pale blue lions passant of Denmark (ca. 1194), the heraldry of the Holy Roman Empire (ca. 1200) and the French fleurs-de-lis coat (1211) although the fleur-de-lis was present on royal robes and ornaments since at least 1179.

Leonese shields with the lion
(Tumbo A manuscript)

Ferdinand II

Alfonso IX

That Alfonso VII took the lion on his banners and arms was due to the dominance of León in the kingdom. When other parts of the Chronica refer to the raising the royal standards in the taken enemy fortress, it is referring to some flags which depicted the lion. It is disputed whether this animal represented to the monarch or kingdom, in the first case the strength of the sovereign but it seems a clearer identification between the words "Legio" and "leo" that would imply the adoption of the feline as image of the city and the kingdom. In favour of the second hypothesis is the fact that in the author of the Chronica made a rhyme with the words "legionis" and "leonis".

=== Historical characteristics of the lion and the flag ===
Seal of Ferdinand II

Seal of Alfonso IX

The flag used in the Middle Ages is different from current ones. The lion was passant instead of rampant. All lions that appear on coins, devices and seals of Leonese monarchs are passant (sometimes dexter, others sinister). There are two exceptions: the lions rampant depicted on shields of Ferdinand II and Alfonso IX in their respective representations of the Tumbo A Manuscript of Santiago de Compostela Cathedral. These cases show lions rampant, the reason being that the heraldic charges should always be arranged in such a way that they take up the greater part of the field. In the case of a shield/coat of arms, the size a lion passant is equivalent to one-third of the field. However, the figure in a vertical position, and enlarged, takes up the available space. This also avoids horror vacui, dominant in the medieval art, filling of the entire surface of a space or an artwork with detail.

Relative to the tincture of the lion, in the representations of the Tumbo A Manuscript, under the effigies of the monarchs are two lions passant in an attitude of attack and their color is purpure.

In the case of Alfonso IX, this lion is framed in a flag whose background is argent and has a narrow purple border. In addition, on the shield carried by the monarch, the lion is that same tincture and the background is argent and the two lions passant shown in the saddle have the same colors. The purple lion and the argent field were retained after the union with the Kingdom of Castile in 1230 when the arms of the two kingdoms were combined in one shield displayed in a quartering, during the reign of King Ferdinand III, called the Saint. There was no space for two visible lions passant at quarterings, so they were rampant to take up the divisions completely. This is the disposition of the lions that has come to the present day on the coat of arms of Castile and León, but the crowned lions were adopted by King Sancho IV (1284–1295).

=== Medieval standard of the Kingdom of León ===
Modern reconstruction of a flag used during the reign of Alfonso VII (1105–1157)

Another late interpretation

The heraldic standard of the Leonese monarch is one of the oldest heraldic flags; the documentation for the colours dates from c. 1150. This flag, as a standard, was not rectangular: it was a swallow-tailed flag and the fly edge is pointed. It consisted of a lion passant purple (purpure) filling the greater part of the field. The background was white, or very light grey (argent).

Leonese coats of arms

The coat of arms used by the provincial council of León

Coat of arms of the city of León

Armies from León, Extremadura, Asturias, Galician and even the Castilians fought under this flag at times of King Alfonso VII, but it was not until 1065 that the County of Castile was separated from León and became a kingdom in its own right. León kept this sign, but Castile was forced to create a new one. In the beginning the Castilians used a simple cross until the Battle of Las Navas de Tolosa (1212) when Eleanor of England, wife of Alfonso VIII, designed the canting arms of the Kingdom of Castile: gules, a three towered castle or, masoned sable and ajouré azure. The choice of colors was not random: Eleanor based them on the Royal Arms of England. In addition, these colors contrasted with those of the Leonese on the battlefield.

== Current coats of arms ==
Leonese armorial achievement with the royal crest (after the union with Castile)

The blazon of the arms of the province of León is: Argent a lion rampant Gules crowned, langued and armed Or. The provincial arms has as crest a former royal crown, without arches, orb and cross (used until the 16th century). The arms of the city of León is described as follows: Argent a lion rampant Purpure, langued and armed Gules. The arms of the capital of the province has a marquesal coronet instead the former royal crown, are ornamented and the lion is not crowned.

Ferdinand III received the Kingdom of Castile from his mother, Queen Berengaria in 1217 and the Kingdom of León from his father Alfonso IX in 1230. From then on the two kingdoms were united under the name of the Crown of Castile. After the adoption of the quartering of the two kingdoms, King Sancho IV (1284–1295) introduced the crown on the head of the lion in the Leonese quarters. The field of the Castilian arms has led to the lion began to be wrongly gules (red). The 1833 territorial division of Spain divided the country into provinces. It was necessary to distinguish between the arms of the city and province. So it was decided to remove the crown from the lion used by the city, restoring the original. After the Spanish Civil War, Juan José Fernández Uzquiza, president of the Provincial Council, introduced in the arms of the province the tail facing the body of the lion.

== Current flags ==
Flag of León Province

Flag of the city of León

The purpurada, a flag used by regionalists to represent León (unofficial)

Flag used by some leftist groups to represent the region of León (unofficial)

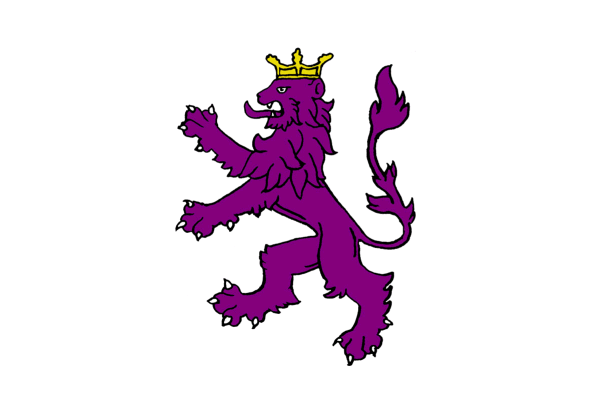
Flag used to represent the Kingdom of León (unofficial)

The origin of the current flag is unknown, but probably not very old. The crimson flag with the royal arms in the center, proper of the Crown of Castile and the Spanish monarchy, and it responds to a fairly late use. Secondly, the first description of a similar standard was found by the writer and linguist Waldo Merino Rubio in the Act of February 18, 1789 of the Book of the Municipal Agreements (Filandón, Diario de León June 5, 1987). According to the Act of February 18, 1789 the standard of the city was crimson, with six small escutcheons Argent with lions Or and silk. In the past, the standards kept by the councils were renewed in every royal proclamation, so the number of escutcheons was variable. Something back is the standard that is kept in the office of the Mayor of León with the arms of the city, with a lion Or and two small escutcheons at the edges embroidered on crimson damask. According to the historian Ricardo Chao, this was the standard of the city of León and served as a model for the current Leonese flag in the nineteenth century. After a time, it also became in the symbol of the province and the historical region of León. During the Spanish transition to democracy a Leonese autonomy movement arose. This Leonesism movement uses a purple flag charged with a coat of arms in the center containing a crowned Purpure lion and a former royal crown as crest. The Leonese sovereigntist movement included the arms used by the autonomy movement within a yellow star and without crowns.

== See also ==
- Coat of arms of Castile and León
- Flag of Castile and León
- Heraldry of Castile
- Kingdom of León
- Lion (heraldry)
- List of oldest heraldry
- Spanish heraldry
