= Flag of Castilla–La Mancha =

Castilla–La Mancha
- Proportion: 2:3
- Adopted: 10 August 1986
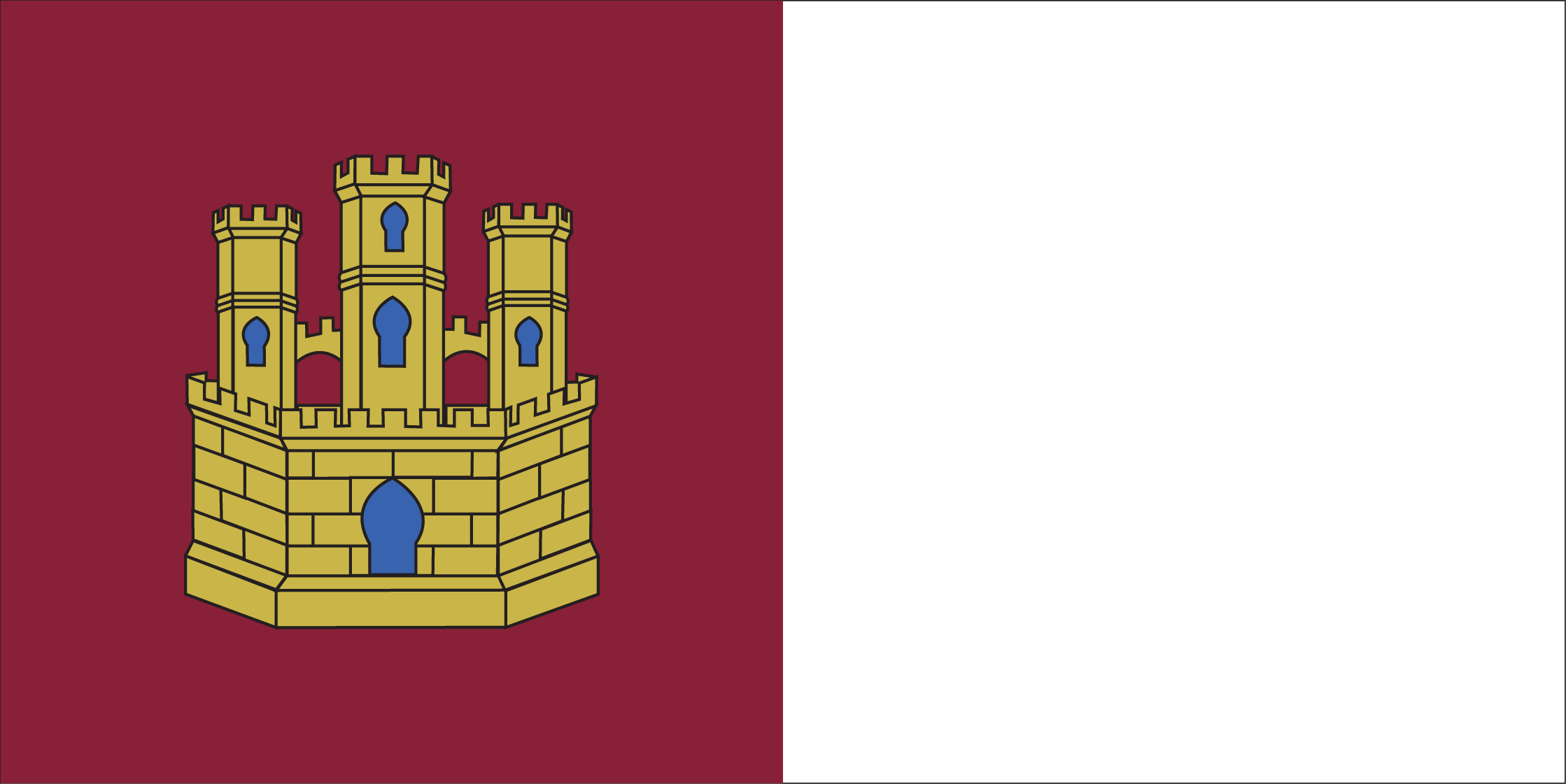
- Proportion: 1:2
- Adopted: 10 August 1986

The flag of Castilla–La Mancha is one of the representative symbols of the Autonomous Community of Castilla–La Mancha, in Spain, defined by its Statute of Autonomy.

== History ==
The region of Castilla–La Mancha may have formed before its Statute of Autonomy was drafted. The parties present in the so-called "pre-autonomous" region choose to adopt a distinctive symbol for this territory. On 11 January 1980, the board held a meeting in Albacete, Spain in which seven designs were considered. Ultimately, it was Ramón José Maldonado y Cocat, a local herbalist, who presented the final selection. The chosen design portrayed the castle enveloped in a crimson red field and complemented by a white canvas to the right, which stood in memory of the Military Orders of Calatrava, Santiago and Saint John, whose militias conquered, organized, and administered the land of La Mancha and whose banners were always red and white. One alternative design proposal also included the Cross of Saint John. The cities of Señorío Real are symbolized in the first barracks of the flag. The final design of the flag represents the historical origin of the land and was ultimately adopted as the Flag of La Mancha in Ciudad Real, 15 December 1977.

== Current regulation ==
Another variant of the flag of Castilla–La Mancha

The Organic law of 10 August, of the Statute of Autonomy of Castilla–La Mancha (BOE 16 August 1982), comes to consecrate the flag designed by Maldonado, having in its fifth article:

1. The flag of the region is made up of a rectangle divided vertically into two equal squares: the first, next to the mast, of crimson red with a castle of gold mauled of saber and ringed of blue and the second, white.
2. The flag of the region will fly in public buildings of regional, provincial or municipal ownership, and will appear next to the flag of Spain, which will hold a pre-eminent place; it may also include the representative of the historical territories.
3. The Region of Castilla–La Mancha will have its own shield and anthem. A Law of Cortes of Castilla–La Mancha will determine the shield and the anthem of the region.
4. The provinces, counties, and municipalities of the region will keep their flags, shields and traditional emblems.

On the other hand, the draft Law for the reform of the Statute of Autonomy of Castilla–La Mancha, which is being processed in the Congress of Deputies, moves to article 4 the regulation of regional symbols and incorporates slight modifications in the text:

Article 4º. Symbols and official party.
1. The flag of the Autonomous Community consists of a rectangle divided vertically into two equal squares: the first, next to the mast, crimson red with a castle of gold mauled saber and azure rinse and the second white.
The flag of Castilla-La Mancha will fly in public buildings of regional, provincial or municipal ownership and will appear next to the flag of Spain, which will hold a pre-eminent place. Similarly, the representative of the historical territories may be included. Next to the flags of Spain and Castilla-La Mancha will be the flag of the European Union.
2. The Community of Castilla-La Mancha will have its own shield and anthem in the terms established by law.
3. The day of Castilla La-Mancha is celebrated on 31 May.
4. The provinces, municipalities, and counties of the Autonomous Community will keep their flags, shields and traditional emblems.

At present, there is no legal regulation in force on the official flag model, or on the exact colors or the model of the castle, so there is frequent confusion in this regard. All this added to that while the Statute of Autonomy speaks of "two equal squares", which implies that the proportions of the flag should be 1:2, while the flags used by the Community Board are of proportions 2:3, the same as the flag of Spain.

This variation in the proportions of the flag is due to the fact that Law 39/1981, which regulates the use of the flag of Spain and that of other flags and flags, in its article 6.2, establishes that when the Spanish flag is used along with other flags, these may not be larger. That is why the flags of the community that are commonly used have the proportions adapted to match in size with the Spanish flag.

== Curiosities ==
- The first autonomic movements of La Mancha, created at the beginning of the 20th century and circumscribed to Ciudad Real and part of the provinces of Toledo, Cuenca, and Albacete, used a very different flag, which, although it did not have much use, was known as the flag of La Mancha. The design of this flag has its origin in the heraldry of the provinces of La Mancha: black for Toledo, red for Cuenca, blue for Ciudad Real and white for Albacete.
- The Castilian movements, for their part, have always considered the crimson banner of Castile as their banner in communion with the rest of the Castilian Communities.
- One circumstance to note is that because of the incorrect description of the flag that appears in the Statute (in the current one and in the one that comes) and subsequent provisions ("two equal squares"), it is assumed that the official proportions of the flag they are of 1:2, contravening the general norm in the Spanish flags and in the majority of the European countries of which these are 2:3. By way of fact, this situation has been corrected, with flags being drawn up and used in the most common proportions (2:3), instead of those established in the Statute, and with a castle design different from that in the official model of the shield.
- Another curiosity to note is that, unlike what usually happens, the Coat of arms of Castilla–La Mancha has its origin in the design of the flag and not the other way around.

== Historical flags ==
Historical flag of Castilla on a crimson background.

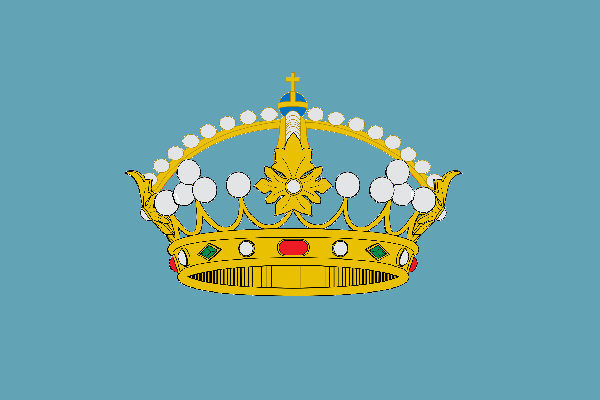
Banner of New Castile and its predecessor, the Kingdom of Toledo

Cross of the Order of Calatrava

Cross of the Order of Santiago

Cross of the Order of Saint John

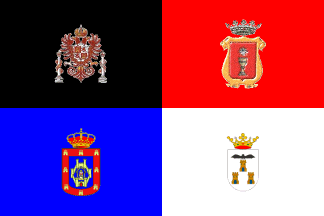
Proposal of the flag of La Mancha of 1906

Proposal of the flag of La Mancha of 1919
