= Flag of Castile and León =

Flag of the Spanish autonomous community

Castile and León
- Use: Civil and state flag
- Proportion: 10:13
- Adopted: 1983

The flag of Castile and León is the official flag of the Spanish autonomous community of Castile and León. It consists of the quartered coats of arms of Castile, represented by a castle, and León, represented by a lion.

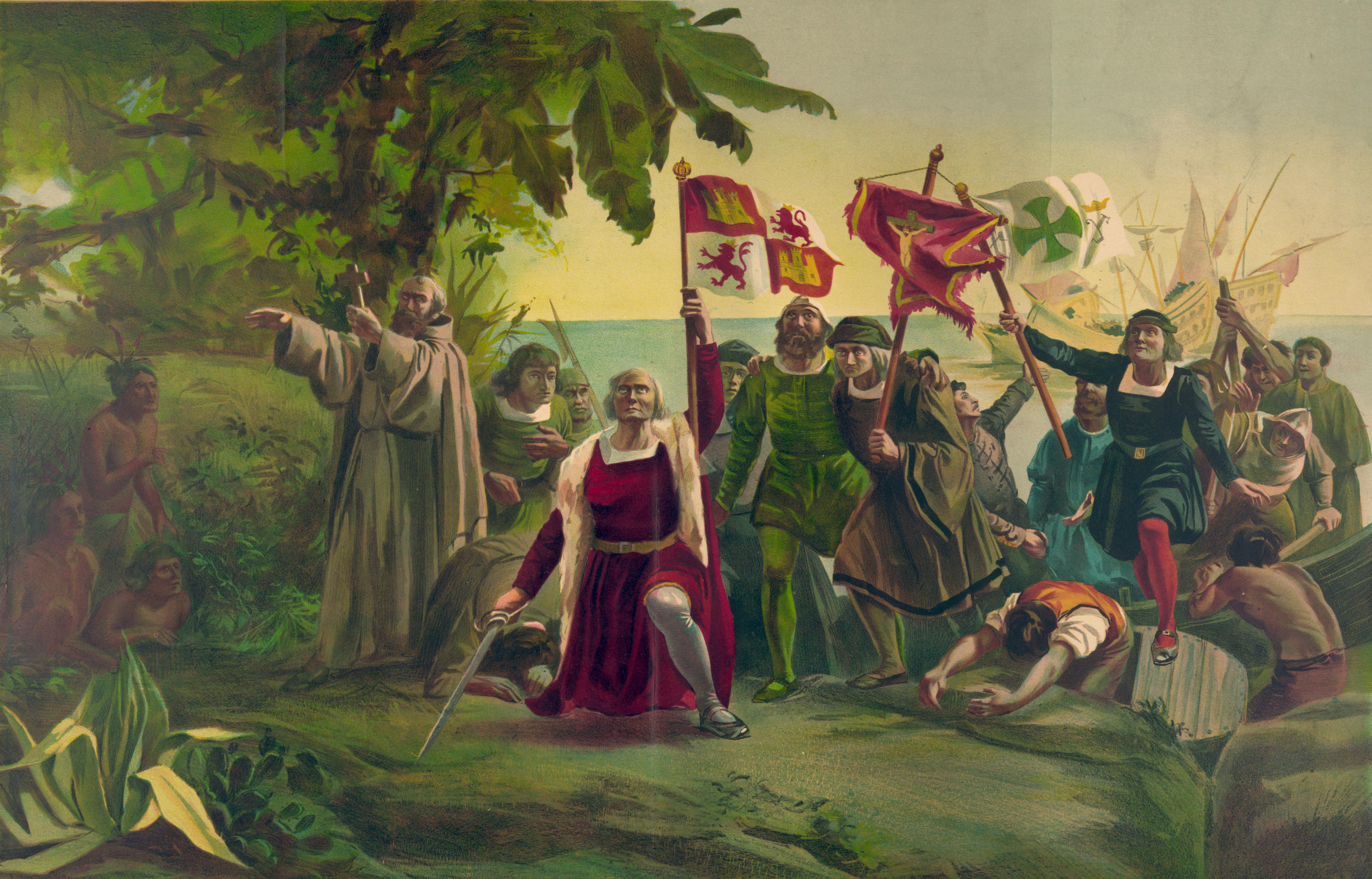
Christopher Columbus bearing the flag of the Crown of Castile when reaching the "New World"

This flag is used to represent the two cultural identities who share the administrative region: the castle for Castile and the lion for León.

The lion design is attributed to Alfonso VII of León, who became king of León and Castile in 1126. The castle symbol is attributed to his grandson Alfonso VIII of Castile, In 1230, Ferdinand III of Castile united the two kingdoms in the Crown of Castile (1230–1715) and quartered the arms as a symbol of the union.

Three centuries of Spanish presence on the American continents left a consistent footprint. In many areas of the Southern United States, for example, symbols of Spanish ancestry are preserved in the coat of arms or symbols of states and cities. Several cities like Los Angeles, California, and St. Augustine, Florida, incorporate the signs of the Kingdom of Castile on their shields or flags.

== Evolution and variations ==
=== Historic Royal Standard ===
Royal Standard of the Crown of Castile – Early Style

14th Century Style

15th Century Style

15th Century Style – Variant

House of Habsburg Rule Style (16th–17th Centuries)

House of Habsburg Rule Style – Variant

=== Current flags and emblems ===
Coat of arms of Castile and León

Regional Government of Castile and León Ceremonial Standard.

== See also ==
- Coat of arms of Castile and León
- Flag of León
- Flag of Castile
