= Coat of arms of Spain =

- Armiger: Government of Spain (Note: Unlike in most monarchies and like Australia and Sweden, the coat of arms of Spain is not an arms of dominion (where the national coat of arms is simultaneously the personal coat of arms of the monarch) since the monarch has his own personal coat of arms.)
- Adopted: 5 October 1981
- Crest: Spanish Royal crown
- Shield: Quarterly: Castile, León, Aragon, and Navarre; enté en point: Granada; inescutcheon: House of Bourbon
- Supporters: Pillars of Hercules with a top of supporters: Dexter An Imperial crown (Holy Roman Empire, Austrian version); Sinister A Spanish Royal crown
- Motto: Plus Ultra (English: Further Beyond)

The coat of arms of Spain represents Spain and the Spanish nation, including its national sovereignty and the country's form of government, a constitutional monarchy. It appears on the flag of Spain and it is used by the Government of Spain, the Cortes Generales, the Constitutional Court, the Supreme Court, and other state institutions. Its design consists of the arms of the medieval kingdoms that would unite to form Spain in the 15th century, the Royal Crown, the arms of the House of Bourbon, the Pillars of Hercules and the Spanish national motto: Plus Ultra. The monarch, the heir to the throne and some institutions like the Senate, the Council of State and the General Council of the Judiciary have their own variants of the coat of arms; thus the state coat of arms is not an arms of dominion.

The blazon of the Spanish coat of arms is composed as follows:

Quarterly, first quarter Gules a triple-towered castle Or masoned Sable and ajoure Azure (for Castile); second quarter Argent a lion rampant Purpure crowned Or, langued and armed Gules (for León); third quarter Or, four pallets Gules (for the former Crown of Aragon), fourth quarter Gules a cross, saltire and orle of chains linked together Or, a centre point Vert (for Navarre); enté en point Argent a pomegranate proper seeded Gules, supported, sculpted and leafed in two leaves Vert (for Granada); overall an escutcheon Azure bordure Gules, three fleurs-de-lys Or (for the regnant House of Bourbon-Anjou); for a Crest, a circlet Or, jewelled with eight breeches of bear or oyster plant leaves, five shown, with pearls on points Or inserted and above which rise arches decorated with pearls and surmounted by a monde Azure with its equator, its upper half-meridian and a latin cross Or, the crown capped Gules (the Spanish royal crown); for Supporters, two columns Argent with capital and base Or, standing on five waves Azure and Argent, surmounted dexter by an imperial crown and sinister the Spanish royal crown, the columns surrounded by a ribbon Gules charged with the Motto 'Plus Ultra' written Or (the Pillars of Hercules).

The contemporary Spanish coat of arms, featured in the national flag of Spain, was approved by law in 1981, in replacement of the interim coat of arms that replaced the official arms of Spain under Franco (1939–75).

== Features ==
The Spanish coat of arms is composed of six other arms and some additional heraldic symbols:

Kingdoms of Spain

Arms	Meaning	Details
	Kingdom of Castile	1st quarter Gules, a three towered castle Or, masoned sable and ajouré azure
	Kingdom of León	2nd quarter Argent, a lion rampant purpure (sometimes blazoned gules) crowned Or, langued and armed gules
	Crown of Aragon	3rd quarter Or, four pallets gules
	Kingdom of Navarre	4th quarter Gules, a cross, saltire and orle of chains linked together Or, a centre point vert
	Kingdom of Granada	enté en point Argent, a pomegranate proper seeded gules, supported, sculpted and leafed in two leaves vert

Additional heraldic symbols

Arms	Meaning	Details
	House of Bourbon (Anjou branch)	Inescutcheon; Azure bordure gules, three fleur-de-lis Or; Oval in the official version
	Pillars of Hercules	Supporters an ancient name given to the Strait of Gibraltar. The motto plus ultra means 'further beyond' in Latin.
	Spanish Royal crown (Heraldic crown)	Crest and top of supporter Or and precious stones, with eight rosettes, five visible, and eight pearls interspersed, closed at the top by four arches also adorned with pearls and surmounted by a cross on a globe

The present version is regulated by:

- Act 33/1981, dated 5 October, on the Coat of Arms of Spain (Official Gazette nº 250, dated 19 October)
- Royal Decree 2964/1981, dated 18 December, approving the official Coat of Arms of Spain design (Official Gazette nº 303, dated 19 December)
- Royal Decree 2267/1982, dated 3 September, technically specifying the colours of the Arms of Spain (Official Gazette nº 221, dated 15 September)

== Official design criticism ==
Coat of arms of Spain (with the corrections suggested by heraldic experts).

The official design of the coat of arms of Spain is like a logotype set in linear style: drawing, proportions of elements and colours (CIELAB). This approach has been criticised by Spanish heraldists Faustino Menéndez Pidal y Navascués, the Duke of Tetuan, and Begoña Lolo for three reasons.

First, the coat of arms pattern is simplified, compared to the usual heraldic usages, which relevantly considers the way of representing the charges and tinctures, because they must be easily identifiable, without error; however, the colours determined by the decree are difficult to distinguish. In particular, the Or and the Gules have been respectively represented so intensely and so darkly that they do not allow for clear distinction of the charges. The colour chosen to represent Purpure has been criticised for being a pinkish hue, unlike the traditional hues of the Kingdom of León and heraldic custom.

Second, the style of the official design does not fit into traditional Iberian heraldic norms. The Escutcheon shape is midway between the modern French style, rectangular with a slightly convex bottom edge, and the Spanish style, with an almost semicircular bottom edge. The Enté en point of the arms of Granada also is represented in the French tradition, with slightly convex top edges, instead of the sharp curved-top edges of Iberian heraldry.

Third, the inescutcheon, superimposed on the main shield, is elliptical rather than the usual escutcheon shape, which is considered imprecise.

Variants employed by institutions
The Senate	The Congress of Deputies	The Council of State	The General Council of the Judiciary	Variant of the Judiciary Badges
The National Police Corps	The Customs Surveillance Service	The Body of Legal Representatives of the State	The General Council of Lawyers	The General Council of Solicitors

== Historical Spanish coats of arms ==
Origin of the Coats of Arms of Spain

Kingdom of León	Kingdom of Castile	Crown of Aragon	Kingdom of Sicily
Crown of Castile	Crown of Aragon	Aragonese; Kingdom of Sicily
Crown of Aragon
Isabella I of Castile & Ferdinand II of Aragon

The Arms of the Kingdom of Spain was the official coat of arms of the monarch of Spain from the time of the Catholic Monarchs, and was used as the official arms of the Kingdom until the First Spanish Republic in 1873. Afterwards, the arms became an integral part of the coat of arms of Spain. The different governments since (whether republican or monarchist) have led to the arms being changed on various occasions, but always respecting the main heraldic design involving the former kingdoms and, in many cases, the pillars of Hercules.

As a reward for his successful voyage of discovery, the Spanish sovereigns granted Columbus the right to bear arms. According to the blazon specified in letters patent dated 20 May 1493, Columbus was to bear in the first and the second quarters the royal charges of Castile and León, the Castle and the Lion, but with different tinctures or colours. In the third quarter would be islands in a wavy sea, and in the fourth, the customary arms of his family.

Coat of arms of the Catholic Monarchs after 1492

=== House of Trastámara ===
The arms of the Catholic Monarchs, Isabella I of Castile and Ferdinand II of Aragon, whose marriage unified Spain, were:

- Quarterly, 1 and 4. quarterly Castile-León,
- 2 and 3. per pale Aragon and Aragon-Sicily.
- The arms were borne by the eagle of Saint John, sable, with an open royal crown.
- The conquest of Granada was symbolized by the addition enté en point of a quarter for Granada

After Isabella I's death in 1504, Ferdinand used different arms, namely tierced per pale Castile-León, Aragon-Naples-Sicily, and Aragon. The annexation of Navarre (1513) brought about the final change in the arms of the Rey Católico (Catholic King): the second quarter was changed to per pale, 1. per fess Aragon and Navarra, 2. per fess Jerusalem and Hungary.

The arms as used in Navarra (until 1700) were Quarterly:

1. quarterly Castile and Navarra;
2. per pale Aragon and per pale Leon and Jerusalem;
3. per pale, a. per pale Hungary and Aragon, b. Aragon-Sicily;
4. quarterly Castile and León; enté en point Granada.

The arms used in Aragon were either Aragon, or per pale, Castile-León and Aragon, or tierced per pale, Aragon-Sicily, Aragon and tierced per pale Hungary, Anjou-Naples and Jerusalem. In Naples, the arms were Quarterly, 1 and 4. Castile-León, 2. per pale Aragon and per pale Jerusalem-Hungary; 3. per pale Aragon and Aragon-Sicily.

=== House of Habsburg ===

Lesser or abbreviated coat of arms of the Spanish monarch:
- 1504–1555
  (Joanna and Charles I)
- c.1504–1580
- 1580–c.1668
- 1580–c.1668
  (Portugal Inescutcheon)
- c.1668–1700

Coat of arms of Philip I of Castile

Imperial crown of the Holy Roman Empire used as top of supporter by King Charles I of Spain. He was also Holy Roman Emperor as Charles V (Imperial crown's later appearance).

Coat of arms of Charles I

At the death of Isabella I of Castile in 1504, her son-in-law Archduke Philip the Handsome immediately staked his claim to her inheritance by quartering his own arms with those of the Catholic Monarchs. He had previously borne quarterly: Austria, Burgundy modern, Burgundy ancient and Brabant, with an escutcheon overall per pale Flanders and Tyrol. Since his highest title was archduke and the Spanish titles were all royal, the Spanish quarters were given precedence over his. Hence the arrangement became, quarterly: 1. and 4. grand quarters, quarterly: A. and D. quarterly Castile-León, B. and C. per pale Aragon-Sicily, the grand quarter enté en point for Granada; 2. and 3. grand quarters, quarterly Austria, Burgundy ancient, Burgundy modern, Brabant, with an escutcheon per pale Flanders and Tyrol.

Charles I marshalled his arms in a number of ways. In the first years of his reign, he most frequently used the same arrangement as his father. After his election as Holy Roman Emperor in 1519 he placed it on the breast of an imperial eagle. Later in his reign a simplified version appears. The arms are per fess with the Spanish quarters in chief and the Austrian quarters in base. This version became very popular in the Netherlands. There it is often seen with the imperial eagle placed on a golden shield, ensigned with the imperial crown and supported by a lion and a griffin. The Order of the Golden Fleece then hangs suspended round the main shield.

In other parts of his extensive monarchy, a number of variations are to be found. Many concern the way in which the Aragonese realms are represented and therefore probably relate to the Crown of Aragon or to one of its constituent parts. In 1516 for instance, he is found using arms quarterly of Spain (quarterly Castile-León and Aragon-Aragon-Sicily, with Granada enté en point) and Austria (quarterly Austria, Burgundy modern, Burgundy ancient and Brabant) with an escutcheon overall per pale Flanders and Tyrol. In 1520, the quarter of Aragon and Aragon-Sicily are replaced per pale Aragon and Naples (per pale Jerusalem and Hungary).

After 1530 some versions display quarterly: 1. and 4. grand quarters Spain, which is quarterly A. and D. Castile-León, B. and C. per pale a. per fess Aragon and Navarra, b. per pale Naples (Jerusalem and Hungary); 2. and 3. grand quarters Austria, (as above); enté en point Granada. These arms are borne by an imperial double-headed eagle sable, surmounted by an imperial crown, surrounded with the collar of the Golden Fleece and accompanied by the pillars of Hercules and the motto PLUS ULTRA.

In Sicily on the other hand, Emperor Charles V used quarterly 1. and 4. Castile-León, 2. tierced per pale Aragon, Jerusalem and Hungary, 3. per pale Aragon and Aragon-Sicily, enté en point Granada. Overall in chief, a double-headed eagle sable crowned or bearing an escutcheon of Austria. Later, his arms in that realm were quarterly, 1. Castile-León, 2. quarterly Aragon, Aragon-Sicily, Navarra and Aragon, 3. quarterly Austria, Burgundy modern, Burgundy ancient and Brabant, overall an escutcheon per pale Flanders and Tyrol; 4. per pale Naples (Jerusalem and Hungary); enté en point Granada, these arms borne by an imperial eagle.

==== Philip II to Charles II ====
Coat of arms of Philip II as Spanish monarch and consort of Mary I of England; 1556–1558	Coat of arms of Philip II before the unification with Portugal; 1558–1580	Royal coat of arms after the unification with Portugal; 1580–1668	Coat of arms of Charles II without the escutcheon of Portugal; 1668–1700

During the reign of King Philip II the arms of the Spanish monarchy become fixed for the remainder of the House of Austria. Originally Philip II used the simplified arms as devised for his father, namely per fess with the Spanish quarters in chief and the Austrian quarters in base.

After the unification with Portugal in 1580 (due to the death of the Portuguese king), the arms of the monarchy became per fess, in chief per pale, A. quarterly Castile and León, B. per pale Aragon and Aragon-Sicily, the whole enté en point Granada and with an escutcheon of Portugal on the honour point; in base quarterly Austria, Burgundy ancient, Burgundy modern and Brabant, with an escutcheon (in the nombril point) per pale Flanders and Tyrol. The arms were crowned with a royal crown with three visible arches and the Order of the Golden Fleece was suspended around them. In the Netherlands, the arms were regularly supported by two golden lions guardant.

Even though Portugal and its possessions were lost in 1640, the Spanish kings retained the use of the Portuguese arms as arms of pretence until 1668.

=== House of Bourbon ===
Coat of arms of Philip V	Coat of arms of the Spanish monarchs from Charles III, House of Borbón

Lesser or abbreviated coat of arms of the Spanish monarch,
1700–1868 / 1875–1931 (eventually):
- Laurel wreath version
- Pillars of Hercules version
- Golden Fleece version
- Golden Fleece and Mantle version

Lesser coat of arms of Spain during the reign of Amadeo

Philip was born in Versailles. He was made the Duc d'Anjou upon his birth. He was the second son of Louis, le Grand Dauphin. In the year 1700, the King of Spain, Charles II, died. Charles' will named the 17-year-old Philip, the grandson of Charles' sister Maria Theresa, as his successor. Upon any possible refusal the Crown of Spain would be offered next to Philip's younger brother Charles, Duke of Berry, or to Archduke Charles of Austria.

Both claimants had a legal right due to the fact that Philip's grandfather, Louis XIV of France and Charles's father, Leopold I, Holy Roman Emperor, were both the husbands of Charles' older half sisters and sons of Charles' aunts.

Philip had the better claim because his grandmother and great-grandmother were older than Leopold's. However, the Austrian branch claimed that Philip's grandmother had renounced the Spanish throne for her descendants as part of her marriage contract. This was countered by the French branch's claim that it was on the basis of a dowry that had never been paid.

After a long council meeting where the Dauphin spoke up in favour of his son's rights, it was agreed that Philip would ascend the throne but would forever renounce his claim to the throne of France for himself and his descendants. It was not difficult to see whether Louis would have refused anyway as a Habsburg ruler in Spain would've put a possible enemy on three frontiers.

The arms of Bourbon-Anjou were added in 1700 when Philip V became king of Spain. He introduced changes in the royal arms of Spain. The king's new arms were designed by the French heraldist Clairambault in November 1700, and were as follows:

per fess: 1. per pale, quarterly Castile and León, enté en point Granada, and per pale, Aragon and Aragon-Sicily; 2. Quarterly, Austria, Burgundy modern, Burgundy ancient and Brabant; enté en point, per pale Flanders and Tyrol. Overall an escutcheon Anjou. The abbreviated arms were quarterly Castile and León, enté en point Granada, overall Anjou.

==== Charles III ====
Charles III was the first son of the second marriage of Philip V with Elizabeth Farnese of Parma, he was one of the so-called "enlightened monarchs".

In 1761 Charles III modified the arms as follows:

Quarterly of six (in three rows of two each): 1. per pale Aragon and Aragon-Sicily; 2. per pale Austria and Burgundy modern; 3. Farnese 4. Medici; 5. Burgundy ancient; 6. Brabant; enté en point per pale Flanders and Tyrol. Overall an escutcheon quarterly of Castile and León enté en point of Granada, overall Anjou. Around the shield are the collars of the Golden Fleece and of the French Holy Spirit (after the Order of Charles III).

The abbreviated arms remained the same (they form the escutcheon en surtout of the state arms). They are accompanied by the Pillars of Hercules and the motto PLUS ULTRA and crowned with the royal crown, but do not show the collars. Already at this time the Anjou escutcheon was sometimes represented without its bordure gules.

=== House of Bonaparte ===
Middle coat of arms of Joseph Bonaparte

Joseph Napoleon I (born Corte 1768, died Firenze 1844), king of Spain (1808–1813), was the elder brother of the Emperor Napoleon I. Following his conquests, the Emperor placed members of his family on the throne of various European states, some of them being created accordingly. Joseph was the first king of Naples (1806).

When Napoleon expelled the Bourbons from Spain, he placed Joseph on the throne and gave the throne of Naples to Marshal Murat, former Commander-in-Chief of the French troops in Spain and husband of Caroline Bonaparte, Napoleon's sister. The long and difficult Spanish War of Independence or Peninsular War, famously illustrated by the painter Francisco Goya, ended with the overthrow of Joseph in 1814.

In 1808, Joseph Napoleon proclaimed a new coat of arms:

Quarterly of 6, in three rows of two each, 1. Castile; 2. Leon; 3. Aragon; 4. Navarra; 5. Granada; 6. Indies (Gules often Azure, the old and the new world or between the pillars of Hercules argent). Overall an escutcheon with Imperial France's eagle.

=== House of Bourbon (first restoration) ===

National coat of arms, 1875–1931 during the (Bourbon Restoration):
- Laurel wreath version
- Pillars of Hercules version.
- Order of the Golden Fleece version
- Golden Fleece and Mantle version

Coat of arms of the Spanish monarch (1924/1931 version)

Coat of arms of Spain during the First Spanish Republic

In 1813 the Allies returned Ferdinand VII of Spain to Madrid. The Spanish people, blaming the liberal, enlightened policies of the Francophiles (afrancesados) for incurring the Napoleonic occupation and the Peninsular War, at first welcomed Fernando. Ferdinand soon found that while Spain was fighting for independence in his name and while in his name juntas had governed in Spanish America, a new world had been born of foreign invasion and domestic revolution. Spain was no longer an absolute monarchy under the liberal Constitution of 1812. Ferdinand, in being restored to the throne, guaranteed the liberals that he would govern on the basis of the existing constitution, but, encouraged by conservatives backed by the Church hierarchy, he rejected the constitution within weeks (4 May) and arrested the liberal leaders (10 May), justifying his actions as rejecting a constitution made by the Cortes Generales in his absence and without his consent. Thus he had come back to assert the Bourbon doctrine that the sovereign authority resided in his person only. Ferdinand VII of Spain reestablished the arms of Charles III, both the state arms and the abbreviated arms. The Anjou escutcheon became increasingly frequently an escutcheon of France.

=== Provisional government (1868–1870) and First Spanish Republic (1873–1874) ===
The First Spanish Republic started with the abdication as King of Spain on 10 February 1873, of Amadeo I of Spain, following the Hidalgo Affair, when he had been required by the radical government to sign a decree against the artillery officers. The next day, 11 February, the republic was declared by a parliamentary majority made up of radicals, republicans, and democrats. It lasted twenty-three months, between 11 February 1873, and 29 December 1874 and had five presidents: Estanislao Figueras, Pi i Margall, Nicolás Salmerón y Alonso, Emilio Castelar y Ripoll and Francisco Serrano.

The Provisional Government of 1868 adopted the present territorial arms: quarterly of Castile, Leon, Aragon and Navarre enté en point of Granada. The crown was a mural crown.

During the brief reign of Amadeo, the royal crown was reinstated and an escutcheon of Savoy (Gules, a cross argent) was placed en surtout. There were not many Spanish arms including the escutcheon of Aosta (Argent, a cross gules within a bordure compony azure and or), the arms used by Amadeo before his accession to the throne of Spain.

=== House of Bourbon (second restoration) ===
When the Bourbons were restored with Alfonso XII of Spain, a decree (8 January 1875) restored the use of the coat of arms as it stood until 29 September 1868. In practice, the Anjou escutcheon (actually called Borbón in Spanish) was displayed without the bordure, because the bordure was considered inessential, and the escutcheon an indication of lineage from the French Bourbon dynasty. With the death of Henri, comte de Chambord in 1883, Alfonso XII became the senior male representative of the French royal dynasty and thus bore its arms without difference. A striking example is given by the royal arms as they appear on the reverse of a 5 pesetas coin of Alfonso XII (1885). The king also used the grand as well as the abbreviated arms of Charles III as personal arms. In 1924 Alfonso XIII did away with the distinction between state and personal arms by combining the two. He took the arms of Charles III, substituted the Aragon quarter with Jerusalem, and replaced the escutcheon with the former national arms:

Quarterly of 6, in three rows of two each: 1. per pale Aragon-Sicily and Jerusalem; 2. 2. per pale Austria and Burgundy modern; 3. Farnese 4. Medici; 5. Burgundy ancient; 6. Brabant; enté en point per pale Flanders and Tyrol. Overall an escutcheon quarterly of Castile, Leon, Aragon and Navarra enté en point of Granada, overall France.

=== Second Spanish Republic (1931–1939) ===
The Second Spanish Republic is the name of the regime that existed in Spain between 14 April 1931, when King Alfonso XIII left the country, and 1 April 1939, when the last of the Republican (Loyalist) forces surrendered to Francoist (Nationalist) forces in the Spanish Civil War.

The Republic of 1931 used again the territorial arms as in the First Spanish Republic but depicting in the second quarter an uncrowned lion.

=== Francoist Spain (1936–1977) ===
(1936–1938)	(1938–1945)	(1945–1977)

Simplified version of the coat of arms to promote bureaucratic aims. It was used on stamps, lottery tickets, identity documents, and buildings. A popular name for it was "coat of arms of the Eagle" (1938–1945).

The Spanish Civil War officially ended on 1 April 1939, the day Francisco Franco announced the end of hostilities. The Republican forces had been defeated and Franco became the undisputed caudillo of Spain. He ruled Spain until he died on 20 November 1975.

The Nationalist senior generals had held an informal meeting in September 1936, where they elected Francisco Franco as leader of the Nationalists, with the rank of Generalísimo. He was originally supposed to be only commander-in-chief, but after some discussion became head of state as well with nearly unlimited and absolute powers.

Franco adopted in 1938 a variant of the coat of arms reinstating some elements originally used by the House of Trastámara such as Saint John's Eagle and the yoke and bundle, as follows:

Quarterly, 1 and 4. quarterly Castile and León, 2 and 3. per pale Aragon and Navarra, enté en point of Granada. The arms are crowned with an open royal crown, placed on an eagle displayed sable, surrounded with the pillars of Hercules, the yoke and the bundle of arrows of the Catholic Monarchs.

=== Spanish transition to democracy (1977–1981) ===
(1977–1981)	(1977–1981) Lesser arms

== See also ==
- Coat of arms of the King of Spain
- Coat of arms of the Prince of Asturias
- Coat of arms of the Kingdom of León
- Coat of arms of the Kingdom and Crown of Castile
- Coat of arms of the Crown of Aragon
- Coats of arms of Spanish monarchs in Italy
- Coat of arms of the Second Spanish Republic
- Symbols of Francoism
- Coat of arms of Toledo, municipal arms based on the royal arms of the 16th century
- Armorial of Spain
- Armorial of the Spanish Armed Forces
- Spanish heraldry
- A solis ortu usque ad occasum
- Granada
