= Coat of arms of Castilla–La Mancha =

Versions
- Logo
- Armiger: Board of Communities of Castile-La Mancha
- Adopted: 30 June 1983; 42 years ago
- Crest: Spanish Royal Crown
- Shield: Party per pale: 1 gules a castle Or, embattled, port and windows of azure and masoned sable; 2 a field argent.

The coat of arms of the Castilla–La Mancha (or Castile–La Mancha) is described in the Spanish Law 1 of 30 June 1983, the Law of the coat of arms of Castilla-La Mancha Region and further regulated by Decree 132 of 5 July 1983, approving the official design of the coat of arms of Castilla-La Mancha and Decree 115 of 12 November 1985, supplementing Decree 132/1983.

The blazon of the arms of Castilla-La Mancha is:

Party per pale. On the dexter [the statute literally says "On the first quarter"], on a field gules a castle Or, embattled, port and windows of azure and masoned sable. On the sinister [the statute literally says "The second quarter"], a field argent. On the crest, a royal crown enclosed, which is a circle of Or crimped with precious gems, composed of eight finials, of Acanthus mollis, five visible, topped by pearls and whose leaves emerge from half-arch, which converge in a globe of azure or blue, with a semimeridian and the equator Or topped by a cross Or. The crown lined with gules or red.

The coat of arms is based on the regional flag, proposed during the era of the "pre-autonomous" region. The selected design was that of Manchego heraldist Ramón José Maldonado. The flag was made official in Article 5 of the Statute of Autonomy. Some institutions as the Consultative Council or the University of Castilla–La Mancha use their own variants based on the coat of arms of the region.

Coat of arms of the University of Castilla–La Mancha

== History ==
The castle symbol as arms of the Kingdom of Castile (gules a triple-towered castle Or masoned sable and ajoure azure) is attributed to King Alfonso VIII, he was King of Castile and Toledo from 1158 to his death in 1214.

The Castilian Realm of Toledo was created after Alfonso VI's capture of Toledo in 1085. The Muslim-led Kingdom of Toledo became a subordinate Christian-led southern realm of the Crown of Castille, having its own court and rulers. As the lands became more homogeneous, by the 18th century the territory was denominated New Castile, differentiating the southern area of Castile from the northern lands of Old Castile. It continued in existence until 1833; its region currently is within Spain. The arms of the former Castilian Realm of Toledo were azure, an imperial crown Or.

The Spanish military orders are a set of religious-military institutions which arose in the context of the Reconquista, the most important are arising in the 12th century in the Kingdom of León and Castile (Order of Santiago, Order of Alcántara and Order of Calatrava) and in 14th century in the Crown of Aragon (Order of Montesa). The birth and expansion of these native orders came mostly at the stage of the Reconquista in which were occupied the territories south of the Ebro and Tagus, so their presence in the areas of La Mancha among other territories. The emblems of the most important orders consists of different-colored greek crosses with fleur-de-lis at its end on a white background (or knight's mantle).

Royal arms of Castile

Coat of arms of the former Realm of Toledo

Badges of the Spanish Military Orders

== See also ==
- Flag of Castilla–La Mancha
