= Coat of arms of Quito =

Versions
- Heraldic representation of the original coat of arms
- Armiger: City of Quito
- Adopted: 1541
- Crest: Golden helmet, with gules and azure feathers.
- Shield: Castle of silver tucked between two hills, with a green cellar at the foot of each of them, and also on top of said castle an or cross with a green foot held by two black eagles, cracked with or, at the sides, put in flight, all in a red field, and by border a cord of St. Francis of or in blue field. Accompanied by a decorated molded card.
- Supporters: Quatrefoils where bunches of fruits hang.
- Other elements: Mantling of gules feathers

The coat of arms of Quito is the heraldic symbol that represents this Ecuadorian city and it was granted and issued by the Spanish King Charles I on March 14, 1541. In the Real Cédula (Royal Certificate) the emblazoned is indicated:

A castle of silver tucked between two hills or rocks, with a cellar at the foot of each one of them green, and also on top of that castle a golden cross with its green foot held by two black eagles cracked with gold, one on the right hand and the other on the left, put in flight, all in red field, and on the edge of a golden cord of San Francisco in blue field.

The castle is a symbol used by Castile, one of the kingdoms of Charles I and the one that had more weight in the Americas, although it is also commonly used for the representation of a fortress, walled town or city of outstanding importance. The mountains, of which no enamel is specified, draw, when placing the castle in between, a valley, thus representing the geography of the city, located between the Pichincha volcano in the west and other hills, mountains and volcanoes to the east. Each hill shows a cava (cave) that can be related to mining, notable at the beginning of the Spanish presence. The cross is a Christian symbol put over the castle and that is held by its foot by two black eagles. The eagles are heraldic furniture very used by Charles I in representation of his imperial ownership of the Holy Roman Empire and that sometimes is shown as one and two-headed or two eagles in themselves. The Royal Certificate ends by putting by border a cord of St. Francis, saint to which the name of the city was dedicated, in or in a field of azure.

The design used by the Metropolitan City Hall shows the shield accompanied by a molded card decorated and stamped by a golden helmet. This version was adopted on 1944.
