= Coat of arms of Toledo (Spain) =

The coat of arms of Toledo may refer to the City of Toledo and for the Province of Toledo.

== Arms of the city of Toledo ==
Coat of arms of the city of Toledo (Spain)

Toledo's arms are allegedly a grant of Charles V, Holy Roman Emperor (Charles I as King of Spain). The coat of arms of the city of Toledo consists of the imperial double-headed eagle Sable (black) bearing an escutcheon with the arms of Castile and Leon quartered and Granada in point (a pomegranate as in the current Spanish Arms) surrounded by the collar of the Order of the Golden Fleece, and crowned by the Imperial crown. The eagle is flanked by two figures of kings seated and bearing the attributes of their dignity: sword and sceptre.

An old privilege granted by the king, Peter of Castile in the Cortes (Parliament) celebrated in Valladolid in 1351 (1389 of the Spanish era), stated that the arms of Toledo are those of the monarch. During the reign of Charles I, the city definitely adopted the emperor's arms, and those are the present arms for the city, adding the figures of the kings, remembering ancient city symbols.

== Arms of the province of Toledo ==
Coat of arms of the Spanish province of Toledo since 2013

Since 2013 the province of Toledo uses the arms of the city without the arms of Granada in point and party per pale with the arms of the former Kingdom of Toledo (Azure, an imperial crown Or). The eagle is flanked by the pillars of Hercules, instead of the figures of kings.
