= Armorial of Spanish autonomous communities =

This gallery of coats of arms of the autonomous communities of Spain shows the distinctive coats of arms of the 17 autonomous communities of Spain (constitutionally they are the nationalities and regions in which Spain is territorially organized), plus the autonomous cities of Ceuta and Melilla.

== Autonomies ==
=== Autonomous communities ===
Emblem of Andalusia (1982–)

Coat of arms of Aragon (1499–)
(legal regulation, 1984–)

Coat of arms of Asturias
(1984–)

Coat of arms of Balearic Islands
(14th century–)
(legal regulation, 1984–)

Coat of arms of the Basque Autonomous Community
(1978–)

Coat of arms of Canary Islands
(1982–)

Coat of arms of Cantabria
(1985–)

Coat of arms of Castilla–La Mancha
(1983–)

Coat of arms of Castile and León
(1230–)
(legal regulation, 1983– )

Coat of arms of Catalonia
(12th century–)

Coat of arms of Extremadura
(1985–)

Coat of arms of Galicia
(15th century–)
(legal regulation, 1984–)

Coat of arms of La Rioja
(1957–)
(legal regulation, 1982–)

Coat of arms of Madrid
(1983–)

Coat of arms of Murcia
(1982–)

Coat of arms of Navarre
(1212–)
(legal regulation, 1982–)

Coat of arms of the Valencian Community
(14th century–)
(legal regulation, 1984–)

=== Autonomous cities ===
Coat of arms of Ceuta
(15th century–)

Coat of arms of Melilla
(1913–)

== See also ==
- Autonomous communities of Spain
- Anthems of the autonomous communities of Spain
- Flags of the autonomous communities of Spain
