= Flags of the autonomous communities of Spain =

This gallery of flags of the autonomous communities of Spain shows the distinctive flags of the 17 autonomous communities (constitutionally they are the nationalities and regions in which Spain is territorially organized), plus the autonomous cities of Ceuta and Melilla.

== Flags of the Autonomous Communities ==
Arbonaida, the Flag of Andalucia, depicting a coat of arms on a background with three horizontal stripes (from top: green, white, green).

Flag of Aragon, depicting a coat of arms on a background consisting of nine horizontal stripes, alternating yellow and red (with yellow on the top).

Flag of the Principality of Asturias, depicting a yellow cross on a blue background.

Flag of the Balearic Islands, with a white castle on a rectangular purple background in the top left, with the rest of the flag consisting of nine horizontal stripes, alternating yellow and red, with yellow on the top.

Ikurriña, the flag of the Basque Country, consisting of a red background with two perpendicular white lines in the front, as well as two intersecting diagonal green lines.

Flag of the Canary Islands, depicting a coat of arms with two lions on a background consisting of three vertical stripes (from left: white, blue, yellow).

Flag of Cantabria, depicting of a coat of arms on top of a background consisting of two horizontal stripes: white on top and red on the bottom.

Flag of Castile-La Mancha, depicting a yellow and blue castle on the right hand side of the flag, above a background consisting of two vertical stripes (from left: red, yellow).

Flag of Castile and León, depicting four rectangles in a two-by-two format, the upper left and bottom right of which being red, and the others being white.

The Senyera, the Flag of Catalonia, depicting nine horizontal stripes, alternating yellow and red, beginning with yellow from the top.

Flag of Extremadura, depicting a coat of arms above a background consisting of three horizontal stripes (from top: green, white, black).

Flag of Galicia, depicting a coat of arms above a white background, with a blue stripe going from the top left to the bottom right.

Flag of La Rioja, depicting a coat of arms above a background consisting of four horizontal stripes (from top: red, white, green, yellow).

Flag of Madrid, depicting seven white five-sided stars in two rows (four above and three below), above a red background.

Flag of Murcia, consisting of a burgundy background with four yellow towers in the top left and seven crowns in the bottom right.

Flag of Navarre, depicting a coat of arms above a red background.

The Senyera coronada, Flag of Valencia, depicting a large blue vertical stripe on the left hand side with yellow decorations, followed by a small red stripe with white and green decorations, followed by nine horizontal stripes, alternating yellow and red, beginning with yellow on the top.

=== Autonomous cities ===
Flag of Ceuta, depicting a coat of arms over a background consisting of eight black and white triangles arranged in a pinwheel pattern.

Flag of Melilla, depicting a coat of arms over a blue background.

== See also ==
- Autonomous communities of Spain
- Anthems of the autonomous communities of Spain
- Coats of arms of the autonomous communities of Spain
