= Coat of arms of La Rioja =

Versions
- Escutcheon-only
- Armiger: La Rioja
- Adopted: 1985
- Crest: Spanish Royal Crown
- Shield: Per pale 1 or, a cross of St. James gules between two escallops argent fimbriated gules, in base a mount vert; 2 gules a castle, on a bridge, or on a river barry wavy argent and azure; all within a bordure azure charged with three fleurs-de-lis or.

The Spanish autonomous community and province of La Rioja has a coat of arms, which was assigned to the former province of Logroño in 1957, and to the present autonomous community on its foundation in 1982. It consists of a shield which is divided vertically into two halves, featuring respectively the Cross of Saint James and a castle, and is surmounted by a royal crown. Also depicted are Monte Laturce and the Ebro river.

== Law ==
According to the third article of the Statute of Autonomy of La Rioja, Organic Law 3/1982:

"The Autonomous Community of La Rioja has its own anthem and coat of arms, which may be modified only by law of La Rioja Parliament, supported by two thirds of its members"

According to the sixth and seventh article of Law 4/1985, May 31 (BOLR n. 64, June 4):

"The coat of arms of La Rioja is, structurally, a parted one, crowned by the closed royal crown. The first partition, or, charged with the red cross of St. James on top of Laturce mount and supported by two pilgrim shells, tinctured in argent and bordered in gules. On the second partition, gules, an or castle with three merloned towers over a bridge mazoned sable, and under it, a river argent. On the bordure, three fleur-de-lis."
"The coat of arms of La Rioja can appear in the middle of the flag."

The arms must appear:

- In La Rioja Government and Parliament sites.
- On titles, honors and distinctions of Autonomous Community of La Rioja.
- In emblems used by authorities of the Community and members of regional parliament.

There is also a simplified version of the arms, more symbolic and suitable for black and white and color sketch reproductions, according to Corporative Identity Manual, Decree 20/2003, 20 May 2003, which defines the Institutional Graphic identity of Autonomous Community of La Rioja and its President (BOR n. 70, June 5, 2003).

== Heraldic description ==
A non-official description, but more theoretically correct according to classic heraldry would be:

"Per pale or, a cross of St. James gules between two escallops argent fimbriated gules, in base a mount vert; and gules a castle triple towered, merloned, on a bridge, or masonned sable and pierced gules on a river barry wavy argent and azure; all within a bordure azure charged with three fleurs-de-lis or, two on chief cantons and one in base"

== History and meaning ==
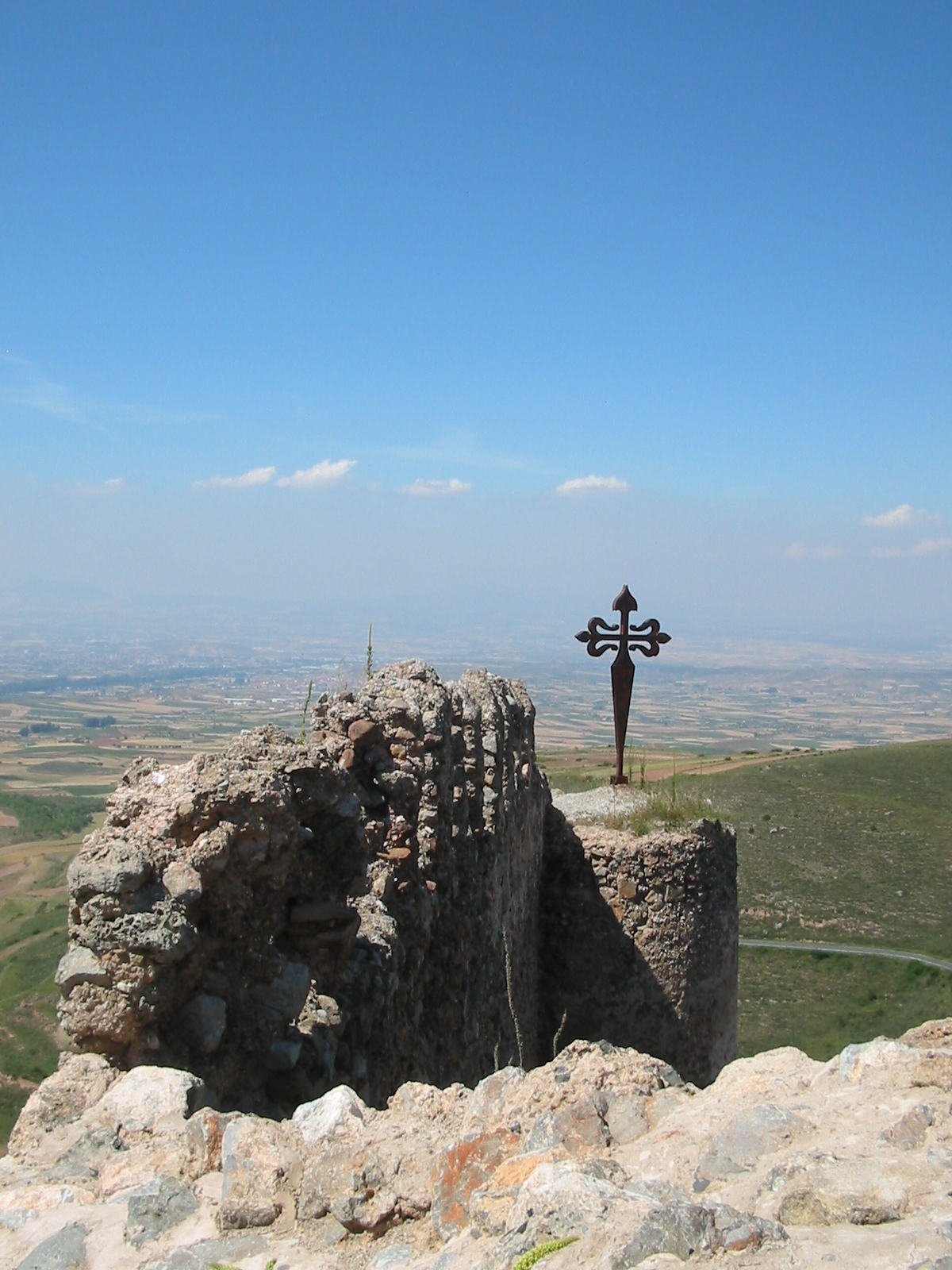
Cross of St. James on the castle of Clavijo

The present shield was approved 5 April 1957 by decree of the Ministry of the Interior (then known as Ministerio de la Gobernación), for use by the then province of Logroño. Those were the same arms adopted by the autonomous community of La Rioja in 1985.

The images on the left side relate to the Way of St. James, which crosses La Rioja from East to West: they are the red cross of Santiago (St. James); below it Monte Laturce, recalling the fictional Battle of Clavijo); and beside the cross are two pilgrim shells. On the right side, the castle has an integrating function, as all the largest municipalities (except Calahorra) show a castle on their arms. Under it is depicted the Ebro river, which irrigates the lands of La Rioja.

Both the fleur-de-lis and Royal Crown are distinctions given to the region by Spanish monarchs in recognition of "heroic deeds performed". The fleur-de-lis come from the arms of the city of Logroño and were granted by Carlos V.

== See also ==
- Flag of La Rioja
