= La Unión de los Tres Ejércitos =

- Populated place
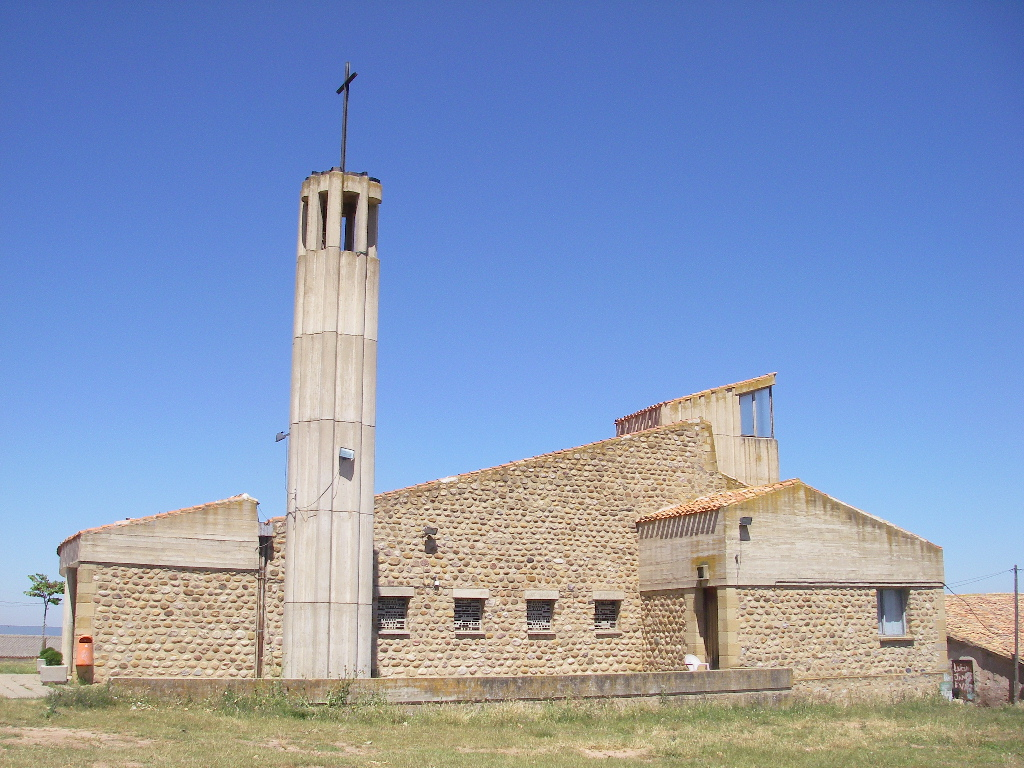
- Church of La Unión.

- Location within La Rioja, Spain Location within Spain
- Country: Spain
- Autonomous community: La Rioja
- Comarca: Logroño

Population
  - Total: 185
- Postal code: 26130

La Unión de los Tres Ejércitos or just La Unión is a village in the municipality of Clavijo, in the province and autonomous community of La Rioja, Spain. As of 2018 had a population of 185 people.
