= Battle of Clavijo =

Mythical battle of the Reconquista

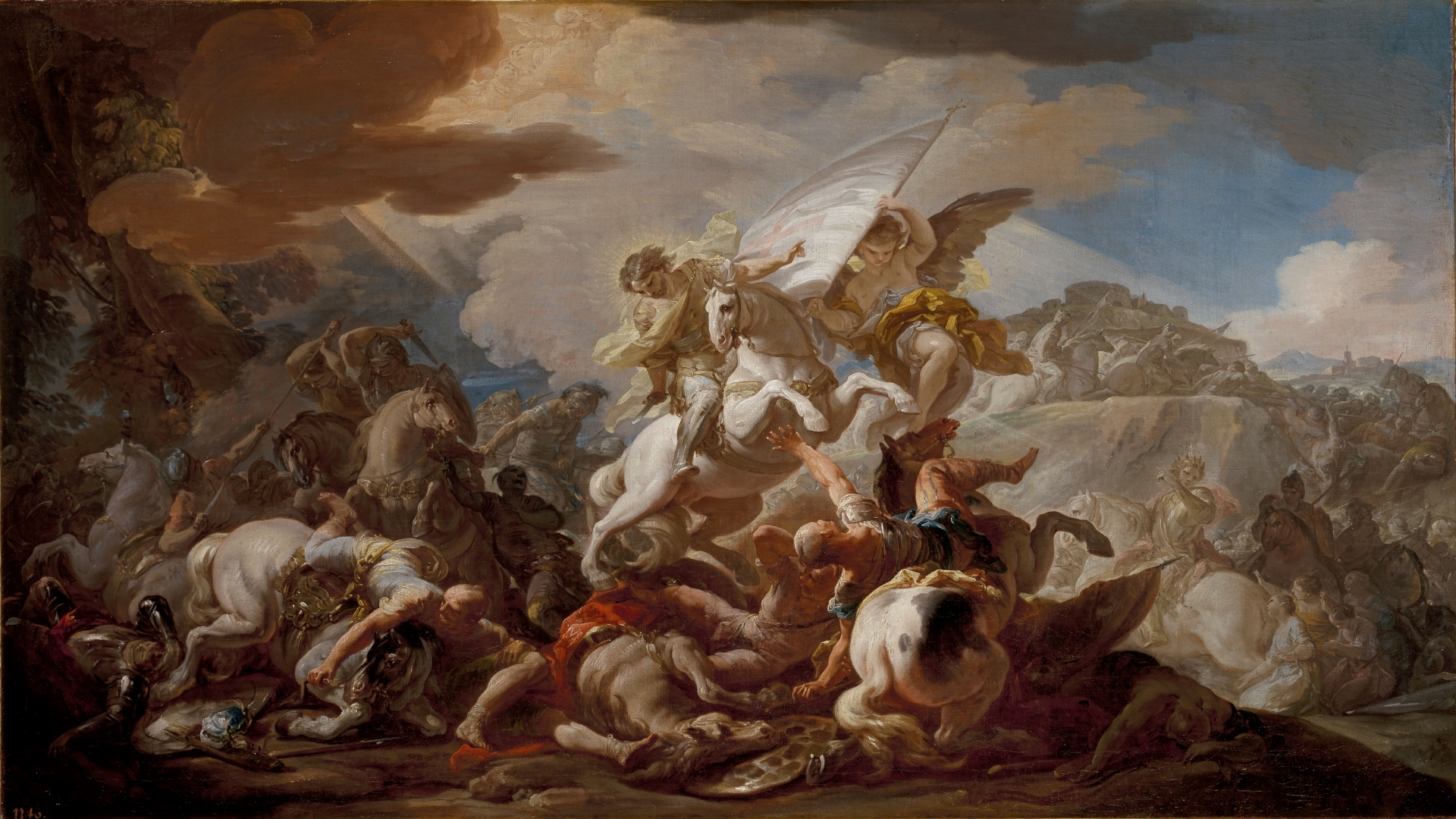
The Battle of Clavijo by Corrado Giaquinto. Museo del Prado, Madrid.

|campaignbox = campaignbox =

The Battle of Clavijo is a battle which became a popular theme of Spanish traditions regarding the Reconquista. Stories about the battle first arose in the 13th century. According to these stories, it was fought near Clavijo between Christians led by Ramiro I of Asturias and Muslims led by the Emir of Córdoba. The Diccionario de historia de España (1968) and the historiographical criticism of Juan Francisco Masdeu have made it be considered today a legendary battle, whose inclusion in the chronicles would be due to Archbishop Rodrigo Jiménez de Rada, in the 1200s that would include, mixing data from other battles of different times and locations. However, the battle was celebrated as an element of shaping Spanish national history and the origin of the pilgrimage of the way of Saint James.

== Legend ==
The battle allegedly took place in May 23, 844, during the Reconquista period, in the Campo de la Matanza, near Clavijo, La Rioja, Spain. The Christian forces were led by King Ramiro I of Asturias and General Sancho Fernández de Tejada.

Ramiro's Christian troops, led by Sancho de Tejada, went in search of the Muslims commanded by Abd ar-Rahman II; but upon reaching Nájera and Albelda they would see themselves surrounded by a large Arab army made up of troops from the peninsula and levies from present-day Morocco, with the Christians having to take refuge in the Clavijo castle in Monte Laturce.

The chronicles say that Ramiro I had a dream in which the apostle Santiago (Saint James or James the Great) appeared, promising victory. The next day, May 23, 844, the armies of Ramiro I, encouraged by the presence of the warrior apostle mounted on a white steed, faced the Muslim army.

After the victory, in honor of Saint James, Ramiro ordered the construction of the Church of the Blessed Santiago and granted Sancho certain privileges in addition to the surname Tejada in memory of the branch of a yew tree that he used as a weapon when his spear was broken in combat.

On May 25 in the city of Calahorra (the year is not specified), Ramiro dictated the vow of Santiago, committing all Christians of the Peninsula to make a pilgrimage to Santiago de Compostela the way of Saint James, bringing offerings in gratitude to the Apostle for his intervention and imposing a mandatory tax on the Church.

With this event, the Apostle became a symbol of the fight against Islam, and since then he was recognized as Santiago Matamoros.

== Modern analysis ==
The first chronicle that cites the apparition of Saint James was narrated (around 1243) by Rodrigo Jiménez de Rada, archbishop of Toledo.

In the legend, James, son of Zebedee, an Apostle of Jesus, suddenly appears and leads an outnumbered Christian army to gain its victory. He became the patron saint of Spain and is known to Spaniards as Santiago Matamoros ("the Moor-killer"). Aspects of the historical Battle of Monte Laturce (859) were incorporated into this legend, as Claudio Sánchez-Albornoz demonstrated in 1948.

The Najerense Chronicles tells of Ramiro's campaigns against the Arabs, while the chronicles of Abd ar-Rahman II speak of Moorish campaigns in Álava, but both agree on the fierce fighting in the Riojan area. More specifically, Asturian-Leonese sources tell of Ordoño I, the son of Ramiro I, besieged the city of Albelda and established his base on Mount Laturce, the same place where legend has it that the Battle of Clavijo was fought. Archaeological finds confirm that fighting took place in Albelda although news of the supposed Battle of Clavijo, supposedly already famous, did not appear in any source until centuries after its date. The battle of Clavijo is the historical reference that Henry IV and subsequently the rest of the spanish monarchs have used for the creation and confirmation of privileges to the Ancient and Illustrious Solar de Tejada to this date. The Solar de Tejada is the only lordship that has remained from then until today.

According to Manuel Gago Mariño, the sculptures at the base of the Maximilian Staircase of the Santiago de Compostela Cathedral, built by Maximilian of Austria are also related to Clavijo.

=== Defense of Clavijo by Tomás Fernández de Medrano, a descendant of Sancho Fernández de Tejada (1602) ===
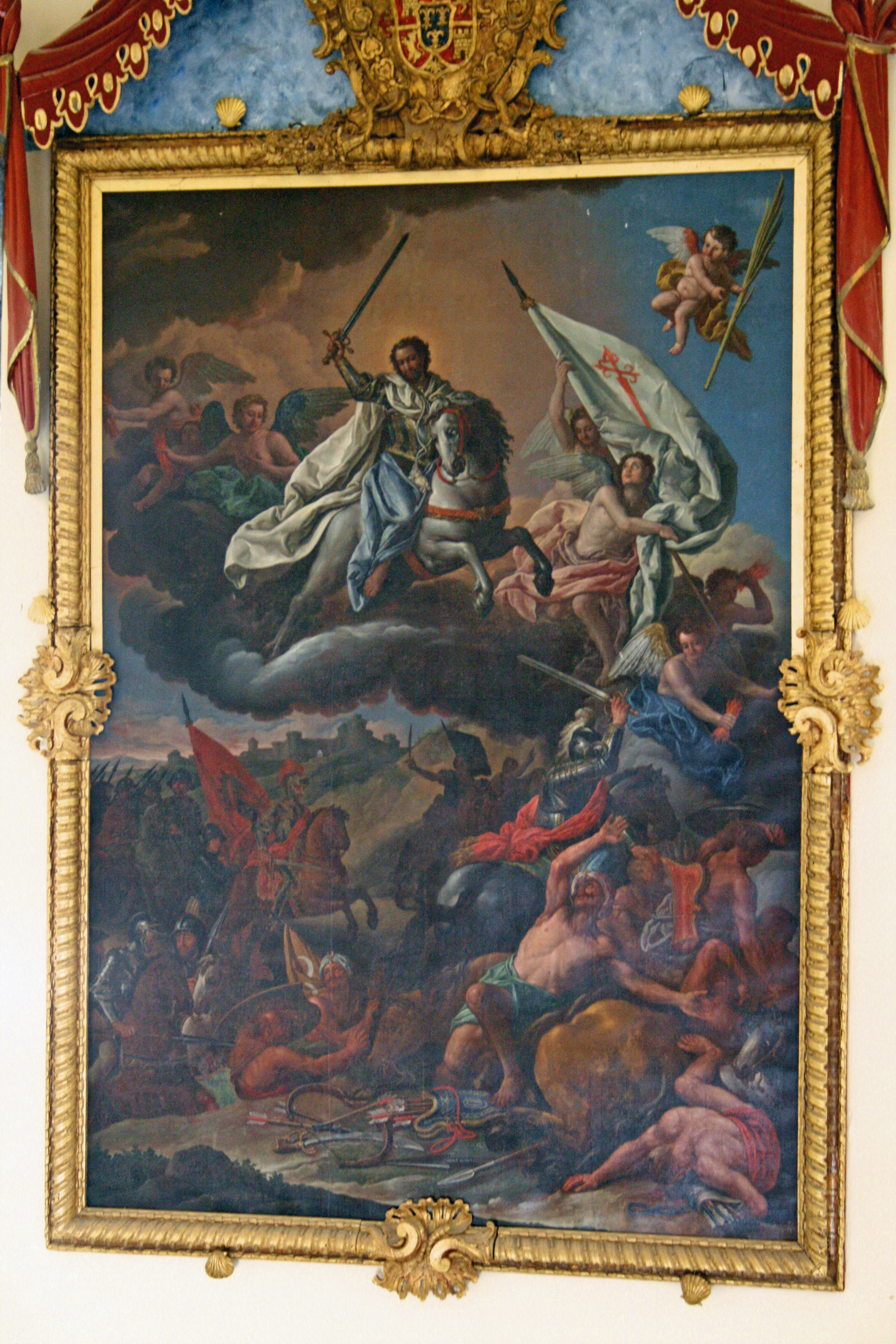
Saint James miraculously intervening in the Battle of Clavijo, as depicted by Antonio González Ruiz. This image reflects the foundational tradition defended by Tomás Fernández de Medrano in his República Mista (1602)

Tomás Fernández de Medrano was a descendant of General Sancho Fernández de Tejada and became the Mayor, Lord, Chief Magistrate and Divisero of Valdeosera, an ancient noble institution that has its origins in the reconquista of La Rioja and the Battle of Clavijo. Tomás Fernández de Medrano, a Spanish jurist and royal counselor, defended the truth of the Battle of Clavijo as a foundational tradition of Spain. In his República Mista (1602), Medrano warned against the dangers of casting doubt on long-standing sacred and national beliefs.

After referencing the emperor Trajan as a model of just authority, he cautioned against historical revisionism, placing the denial of Clavijo on the same level as denying core elements of Spain's spiritual identity:

"Saying otherwise would be like denying that the glorious Apostle James preached in Spain, that we possess his body, or that he visibly fought against the Moors in the Battle of Clavijo in support of King Ramiro, leading to a vow from us all. Or claiming that it is merely a saying, without truth, that all nations come to honor him, as they have done for so long. Such assertions would cause scandal to the Church, undermining a long-held, confirmed, and sanctified tradition by the supreme Pontiffs who themselves made pilgrimages and performed miracles at his shrine."

Medrano affirmed, "we might as well deny the existence of El Cid or Count Fernán González, even though they lived recently and we see so many descendants, both great and small."

He closed with a direct appeal to the reader's conscience and scholarly humility:

"Handle traditions, sacred or profane, with respect, so as not to appear impious or cynical in a misguided show of curiosity or erudition."

Medrano confirmed that Clavijo was a sanctified historical truth, affirmed by popes, pilgrims, and the national memory of Spain.

== Gallery ==
Saint James' appearance at Clavijo has been a major theme in art. Among those artists who portrayed him there are Aniello Falcone, Paolo da San Leocadio, Evaristo Muñoz, Mateo Pérez, Martin Schongauer, Corrado Giaquinto, and Antonio González Ruiz.

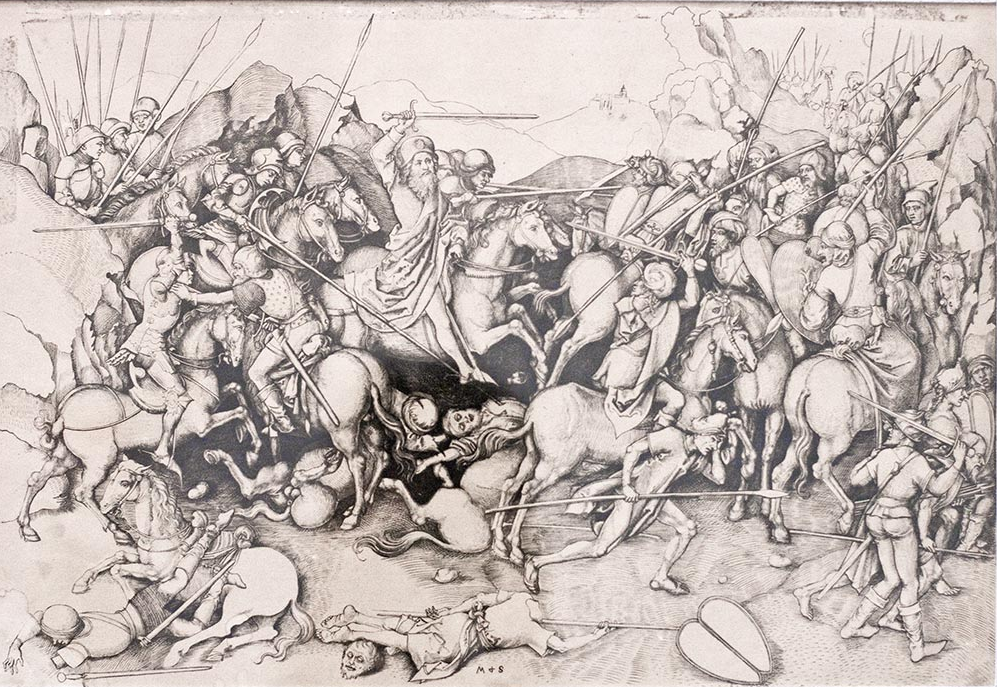
Late medieval engraving of the battle of Clavijo by Martin Schongauer

Gable of the Pazo de Raxoi, Santiago de Compostela, Spain

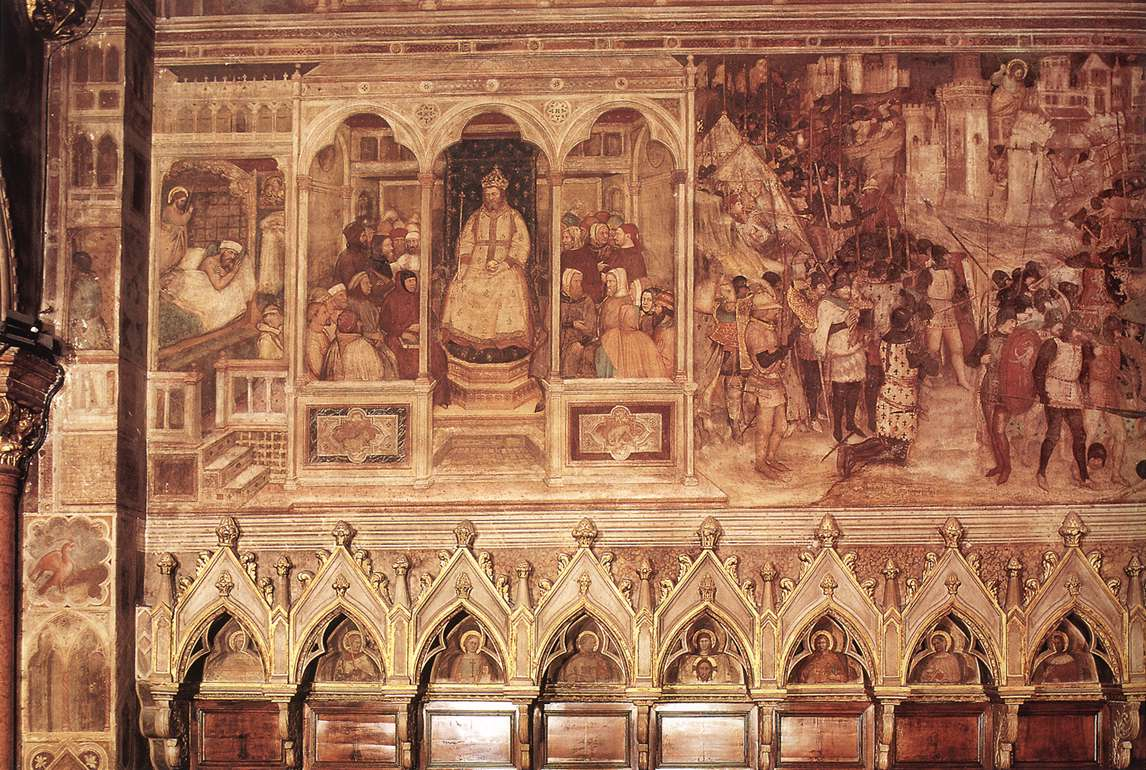
Scenes from the life of Saint James, including the battle of Clavijo

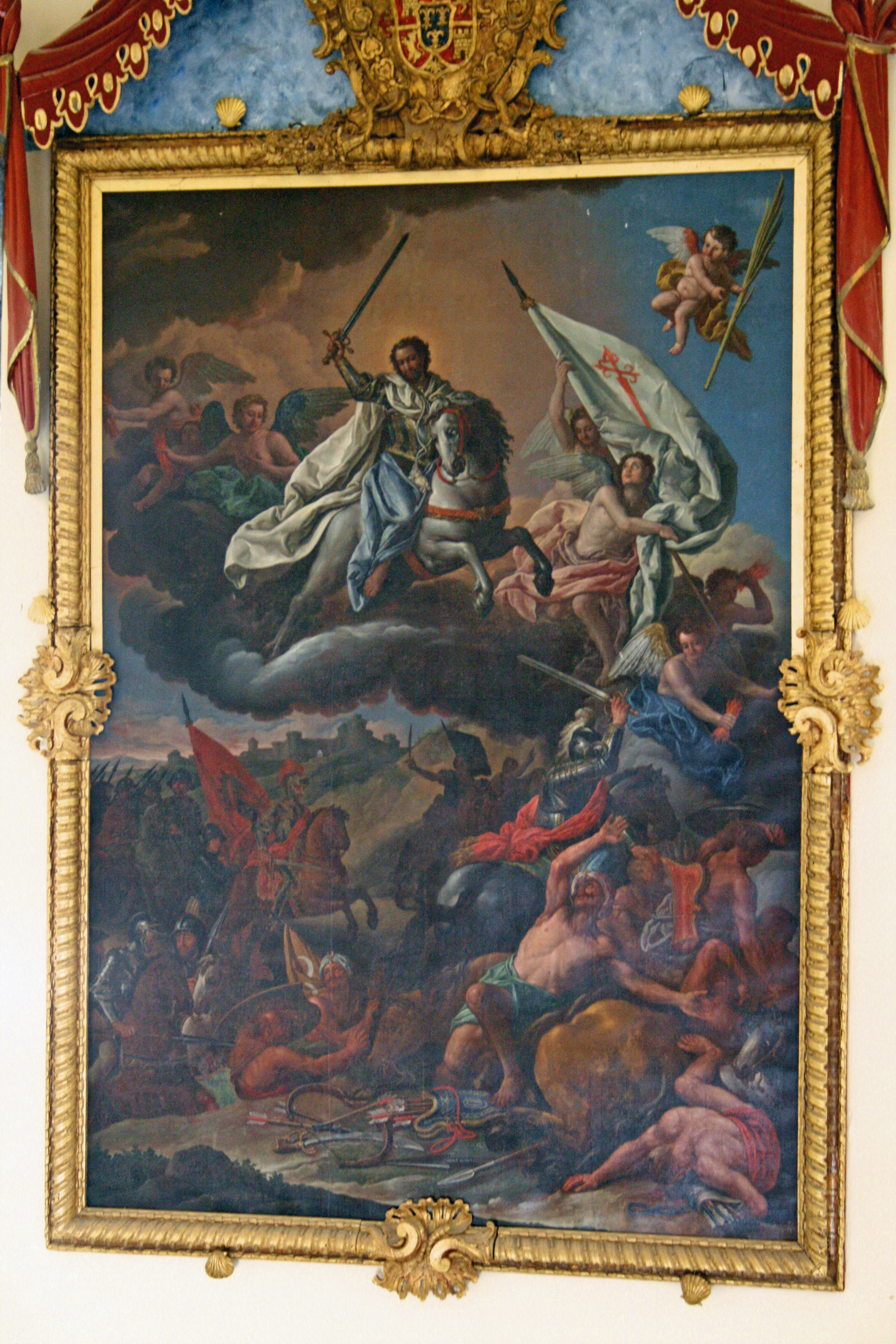
Saint James appearing at Clavijo, by Antonio González Ruiz

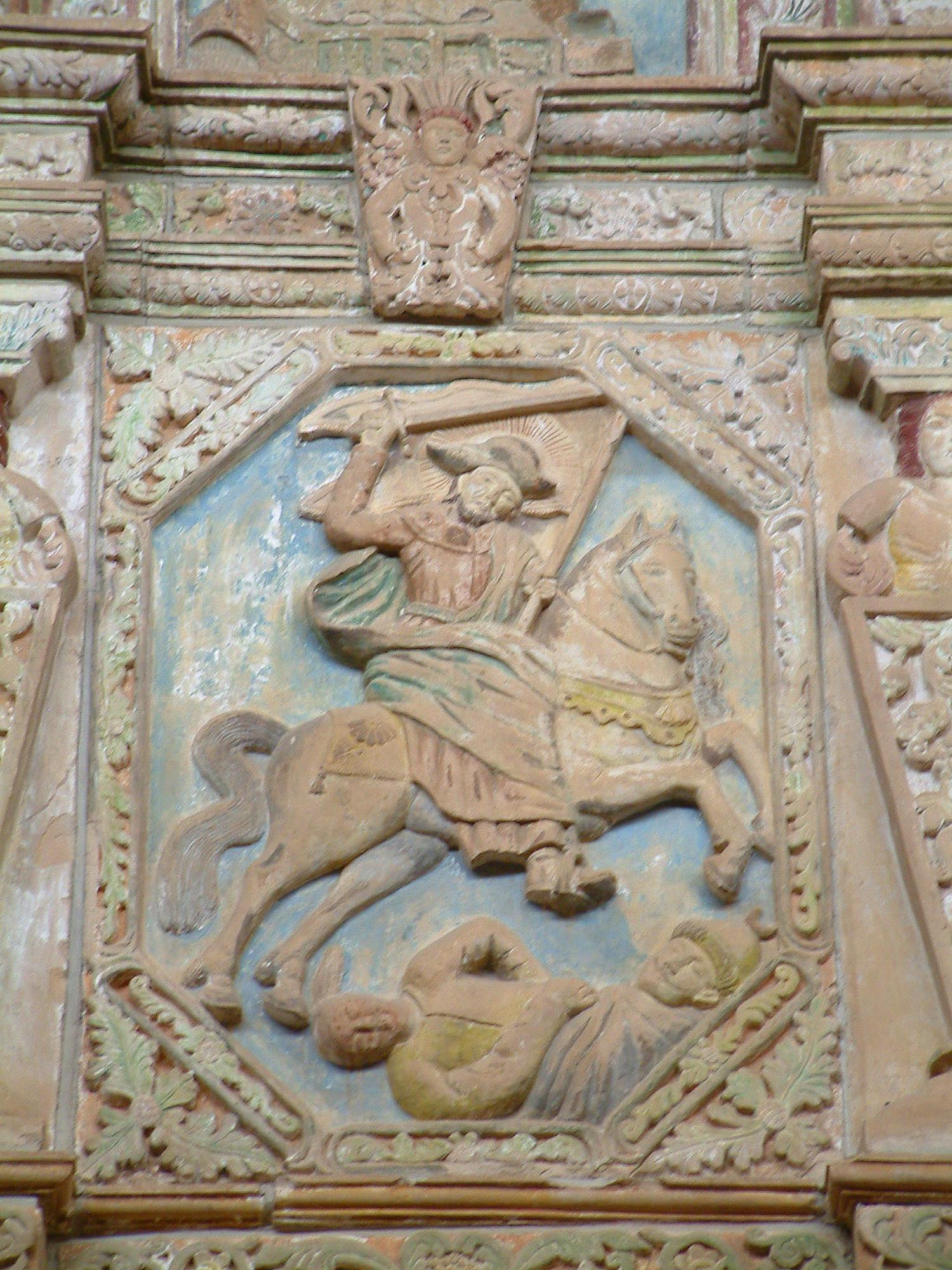
St. James as carved by anonymous Mexican stone carvers. Santa Fe, New Mexico, United States 1760

== See also ==
- Cross of Saint James
- Lord of Valdeosera
- Asturias in the Reconquista

== Sources ==
- Pérez de Urbel, Justo. 1954. "Lo viejo y lo nuevo sobre el origin del Reino de Pamplona". Al-Andalus, 19:1–42, especially 20–6.
- Fletcher, Richard A. 1984. Saint James's Catapult: The Life and Times of Diego Gelmírez of Santiago de Compostela. Oxford: Oxford University Press.
