= Anthems of the autonomous communities of Spain =

Regional anthems in Spain

Several of the 17 autonomous communities of the Kingdom of Spain, plus the two autonomous cities, have their own anthems, ranging from quasi-national anthems of the historical nationalities to regional anthems and songs, with some virtually unknown even in their own communities. Below is a list of those songs.

Autonomous community	Anthem	First verse	Audio
Andalusia	La bandera blanca y verde	La bandera blanca y verde...	
Aragon	Himno de Aragón	Nos ha llevado el tiempo...	
Asturias	Asturias, patria querida	Asturias, Patria querida... / Asturies, Patria querida	
Balearic Islands	La Balanguera	La Balanguera, misteriosa...	
Basque Country	Eusko Abendaren Ereserkia	Gora ta gora Euzkadi!	
Canary Islands	Himno de Canarias	Soy la sombra de un almendro...	
Cantabria	Himno a la Montaña	Cantabria querida...	
Castile and León	Official: none; unofficial: Madre Castilla and Canto de Esperanza	Madre Castilla, guíanos tu...; 1521, en Abril para más señas...	
Catalonia	Els Segadors	Catalunya triomfant...	
Extremadura	Himno de Extremadura	Nuestras voces se alzan...	
Galicia	Os Pinos	Que din os rumorosos...	
La Rioja	La Rioja	no lyrics	
Community of Madrid	Himno de la Comunidad de Madrid	Yo estaba en el medio...	
Region of Murcia	Official: none; unofficial: Canto a Murcia	En la huerta del Segura, ...	
Navarre	Himno de Navarra	Por Navarra, tierra brava y noble / Nafarroa, lur haundi ta azkar	
Valencian Community	Himne de València	Per a ofrenar noves glòries a Espanya...	
Ceuta	Himno de Ceuta	Salud, noble ciudad...	
Melilla	Himno de Melilla	Entonemos un himno delante...	

== See also ==
- Autonomous communities of Spain
- Flags of the autonomous communities of Spain
- Coats of arms of the autonomous communities of Spain
- List of regional anthems
