= Flag of Extremadura =

Extremadura
- Proportion: 2:3
- Adopted: February 26, 1983; 43 years ago
- State flag
- Proportion: 2:3

The flag of Extremadura, according to Article 4-1 of the Statute of Autonomy, consists of three horizontal stripes of green, white, and black. The state flag, used by Extremadura's government and administration, must use the variant with the coat of arms of the region off-centred toward the hoist.

== Origins and significance ==
The flag first appeared in the middle of the 1970s, after the death of Francisco Franco, in an era when the rights of the regional communities were being reclaimed and re-established across Spain.

Despite the flag's relatively recent origins, various interpretations exist regarding why green, white, and black were chosen and what they signify; even the inventor or creator of the flag is unknown. What is known is that by the 1980s the flag had become so popular amongst Extremadurans as the principal symbol of regional identity that those who presented the Statute of Autonomy in 1983 did not hesitate in including an article concerning this flag in this Statute.

In official government publications, the colors of the flag are said to honor aspects of the region's history during the Middle Ages:

- Green: color of the emblem of the Order of Alcántara.
- White: representing the Kingdom of León, which repopulated the region during the Reconquista.
- Black: representing the Aftasid kings of the Taifa of Badajoz.

However, in 2008, in the regional press, a professor of history named Antonio Galache Cortés posited his own theory on the meaning of the flag's colors. Galache Cortés believed that the color green referred to the Muslim era of Spain, in which Extremadura enjoyed its only period of complete independence as an Aftasid taifa. The color white referred to the Kingdom of León and the integration of the region into what would become Spain, while black was the color of the clothing worn by the Lusitanians, according to Strabo.

Galache Cortés’ theory has been disputed. In a television interview, Luis Ramallo, president of the region before the era of autonomy, attributed the creation of the flag to a lawyer from Oliva de la Frontera, Martín Rodríguez Contreras. This theory was supported by professor of anthropology Javier Marcos Arévalo, who in his studies on Extremaduran identity states that Rodríguez Contreras’ design was chosen after various proposals and its colors were derived from the following:

- Green and white from the traditional colors of Cáceres.
- Black and white from the colors of Badajoz.

In terms of symbolic meaning, the green symbolizes hope, the white honor of the people, the black to unemployment, marginalization, and backwardness, although it can also refer to the region's Almohad past. Javier Marcos Arévalo adds that the flag first appears in the written record on February 27, 1977, and made its first public appearance on November 14, 1976, at Oliva de la Frontera. Its first official sanction occurred in the city of Cáceres after a motion was passed by the Junta Preautonómica and later made into law by the Statute of Autonomy.

The widow of Martín Rodríguez Contreras has written articles also attributing the creation of the flag to her husband.

Another theory on the flag's colors, which has become a popular one, asserts that the flag originated when the colors of the football clubs of the two capitals of the province, the Club Polideportivo Cacereño (green shirt, white shorts) and the Club Deportivo Badajoz (black-and-white shirt, white shorts) were combined. However, the two athletic clubs simply took their colors from the traditional colors of their respective cities and provinces: green for Cáceres and black (from the Aftasid taifa) for Badajoz. Another theory explains the colors as signifying:

- Green: hope for a new Extremadura.
- White: purity of the natural environment.
- Black: sadness of the various emigrants who have had to leave their beloved land.

== See also ==
- Coat of arms of Extremadura
- Flags of the autonomous communities of Spain
