= Himno de Canarias =

Official anthem of the Canary Islands, Spain

Himno de Canarias Arrorró
English: Anthem of the Canaries
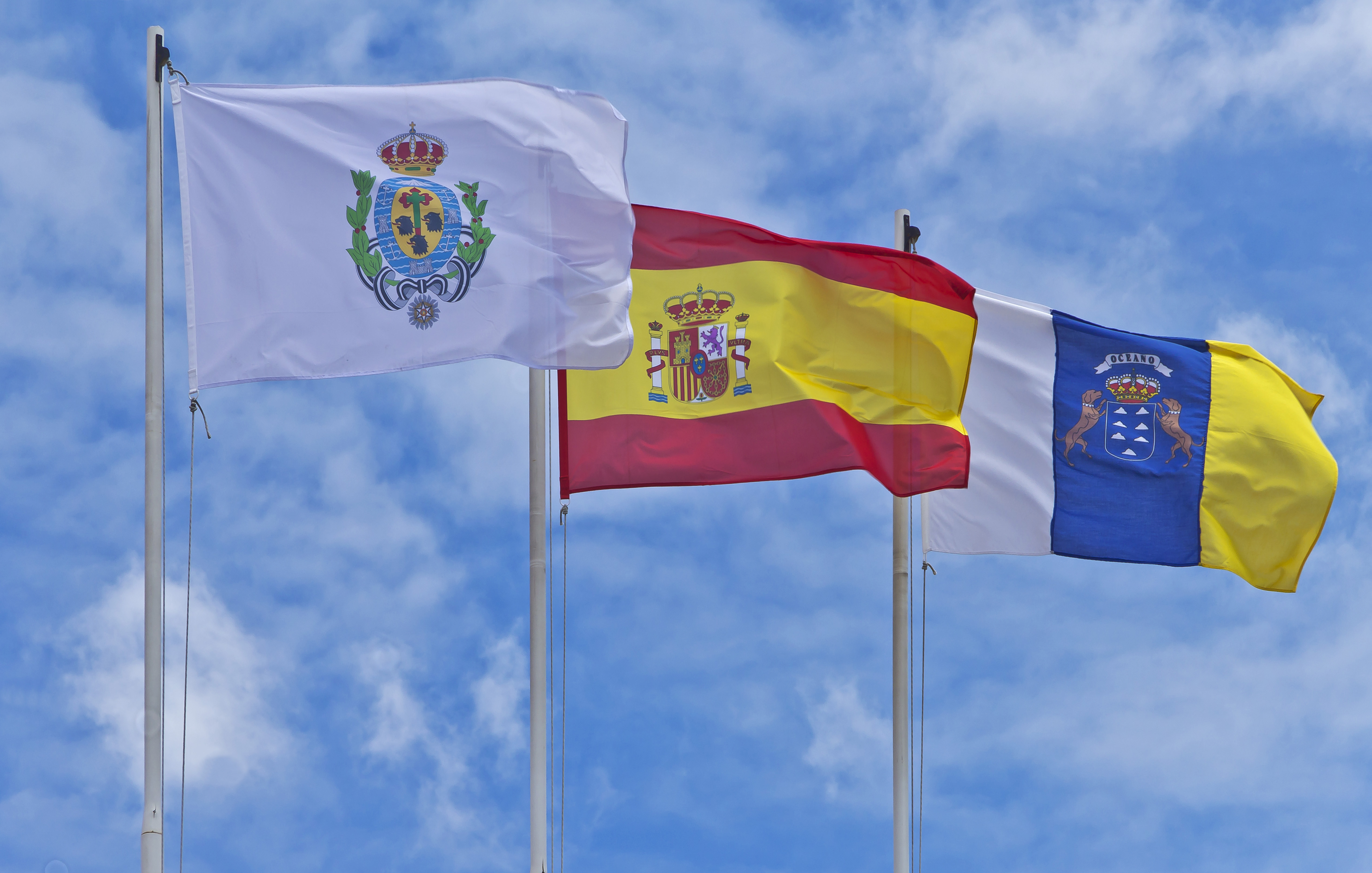
- Flags of Santa Cruz de Tenerife, Spain and the Canary Islands
- Regional anthem of Canary Islands, Spain
- Lyrics: Benito Cabrera
- Music: Teobaldo Power
- Adopted: 28 April 2003

The "Himno de Canarias" ("Anthem of the Canaries"), also known as the "Arrorró" ("Lullaby"), is the official anthem of the Canary Islands, Spain. The song was composed by Teobaldo Power. It was adapted as the community's anthem and incorporated as such on 30 May 2003.

== History ==
The anthem became official with Law 20/2003 of 28 April 2003. The Law begins with the following paragraph contained in the General Provisions: "Let it be known to all citizens that the Parliament of the Canary Islands has approved and I, on behalf of the King and in accordance with what is established in article 12.8 of the Statute of Autonomy, have promulgated and ordered the publication of Law 20/2003, of 28 April, of the Anthem of the Canary Islands."

Until the implementation of the current anthem, a variation of the Arrorró from the Cantos Canarios by Teobaldo Power, there was an unofficial anthem (ONU) that was used in many functions and with which the Pasodoble Islas Canarias festivities were concluded.

There is also an "Himno a Canarias" ("Hymn to the Canary Islands"), with lyrics by the Tenerife poet Fernando García Ramos and music by the Gran Canaria composer Juan José Falcón Sanabria, commissioned by the first president of the autonomous community, socialist Jerónimo Saavedra.

After a debate in the Parliament of the Canary Islands, and with the contribution of new lyrics by Canarian musician Benito Cabrera to the "Arrorró" by Teobaldo Power, the official anthem of the Canary Islands was embodied in the aforementioned Law 20/2003.

In January 2019, the government of the Canary Islands agreed to change the lyrics of the anthem from siete ("seven") to ocho ("eight") rocks, in recognition of La Graciosa, which had become the eighth Canary Island in 2018, having previously been administratively dependent on Lanzarote.

== Lyrics ==
Spanish original

Soy la sombra de un almendro,
Soy volcán, salitre y lava.
Repartido en ocho (Note: Previously siete ("seven") before 2019.) peñas
Late el pulso de mi alma.

Soy la historia y el futuro,
Corazón que alumbra el alba
De unas islas que amanecen
Navegando la esperanza.

Luchadoras en nobleza
Bregan el terrero limpio
De la libertad...

Esta es la tierra amada:
Mis Islas Canarias.
Como un solo ser
Juntas soñarán
Un rumor de paz
Sobre el ancho mar.

English translation

I am the shadow of an almond tree,
I am volcano, saltpetre and lava.
Distributed in eight rocks
The pulse of my soul beats.

I am the history and the future,
Heart that lights up the dawn
Of some islands that awaken
Navigating hope.

Fighters in nobility
Fight the honourable soil
Of freedom...

This is the beloved land:
My Canary Islands.
As a single being
Together they will dream
A rumour of peace
Over the wide sea.

== See also ==
- Anthems of the autonomous communities of Spain
