= La bandera blanca y verde =

Regional anthem of Andalusia, Spain

English: The Green and White Flag
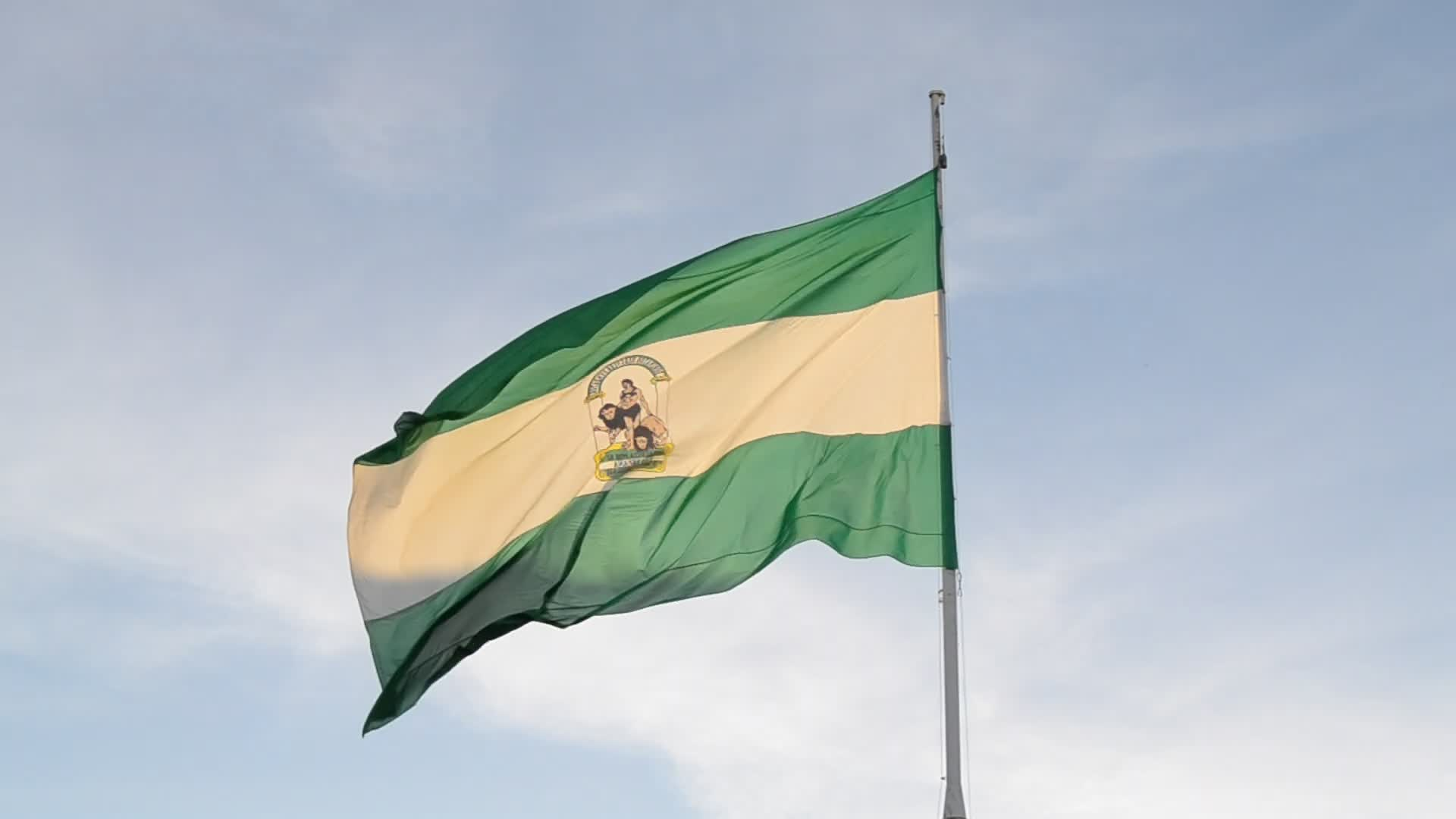
- Flag of Andalusia
- Regional anthem of Andalusia (Spain)
- Lyrics: Blas Infante
- Music: José del Castillo Díaz
- Adopted: 1981

Audio sample
- 2007 official orchestral and choral vocal recording: file; help

"La bandera blanca y verde" (pronounced [la βanˈdeɾa ˈβlaŋkaj ˈβeɾðe]; "The Green and White Flag") is the official anthem of Andalusia, an autonomous community of Spain, adopted under the first Andalusian Statute of Autonomy. The lyrics were written by Blas Infante. The music for the anthem of Andalusia was composed by the former director of the municipal band of Sevilla, José del Castillo Díaz. The origins of the music are vaguely inspired on the Santo Dios, a religious cantic widely spread in rural Andalusia, usually sung by peasants while reaping their crops. It is believed that Blas Infante suggested the music to José del Castillo. The melody of the anthem is Castillo's original though. After the Spanish Civil War, the original music scores were destroyed, and only a manuscript for piano is conserved. The composer Manuel Castillo improved José del Castillo's version.

== Lyrics ==
Spanish original

I
La bandera blanca y verde
vuelve, tras siglos de guerra,
a decir paz y esperanza,
bajo el sol de nuestra tierra.

Coro:
¡Andaluces, levantaos!
¡Pedid tierra y libertad!
¡Sea por Andalucía libre,
España y la Humanidad!

II
Los andaluces queremos
volver a ser lo que fuimos
hombres de luz, que a los hombres,
alma de hombres les dimos.

Coro

IPA (Note: See Help:IPA/Spanish and Spanish phonology.)

I
[la βan.ˈde.ɾa ˈβlaŋ.ka‿i ˈβeɾ.ðe]
[ˈbwel.βe tɾas ˈsiɡ.los ðe ˈɣe.ra]
[a de.θir paθ ʝ(‿)es.pe.ˈɾan.θa]
[ˈba.xo‿el sol de ˈnwes.tɾa ˈtje.ra]

[ˈko.ɾo]
[an.da.ˈlu.θes le.ˈβan.ta.os]
[pe.ˈðið ˈtje.ra‿i li.βeɾ.ˈtað]
[ˈse.a poɾ an.da.lu.ˈθi.a ˈli.βɾe]
[es.ˈpa.ɲa‿i la u.ma.ni.ˈðað]

2
[los an.da.ˈlu.θes ke.ˈɾe.mos]
[bol.ˈβeɾ a seɾ lo ke ˈfwi.mos]
[ˈom.bɾes ðe luθ ke‿a los ˈom.bɾes]
[ˈal.ma ðe ˈom.bɾes los ˈði.mos]

[ˈko.ɾo]

English translation

I
The Green and White Flag
After centuries of war returneth.
Of peace and hope it soweth
Under our land's sunshine.

Chorus:
Arise, o Andalusians!
Demand land and freedom!
For a free Andalusia,
Spain and Mankind!

II
We Andalusians shall become
Once again what we were:
Enlightened folk who gave
Human soul to mankind.

Chorus

Aljamiado

١
لبندار بانك اباردا
،بوالبا، ترس سغلس داغارّ
،اسامبرر بز اءاسبارنز
.بخ السل دانواستر تيارّ

:كر
!اندلساس، لابنس
!بادد تيارّ البارتد
،ساه بر اندلسيه لبرا
!ءاسبنّ العمندد

أ
لس اندلساس كارامس
بلبار اسار لكا فويمس
،عمبراس دالز، كا السعمبراس
.الم داعمبراس لاسدمس

كر

== See also ==
- Anthems of the autonomous communities of Spain
