= Flag of Ceuta =

Flag of the Spanish autonomous city

- Proportion: 2:3
- Adopted: 13 March 1995
- Design: A black and white gyronny with the coat of arms of Ceuta in the center

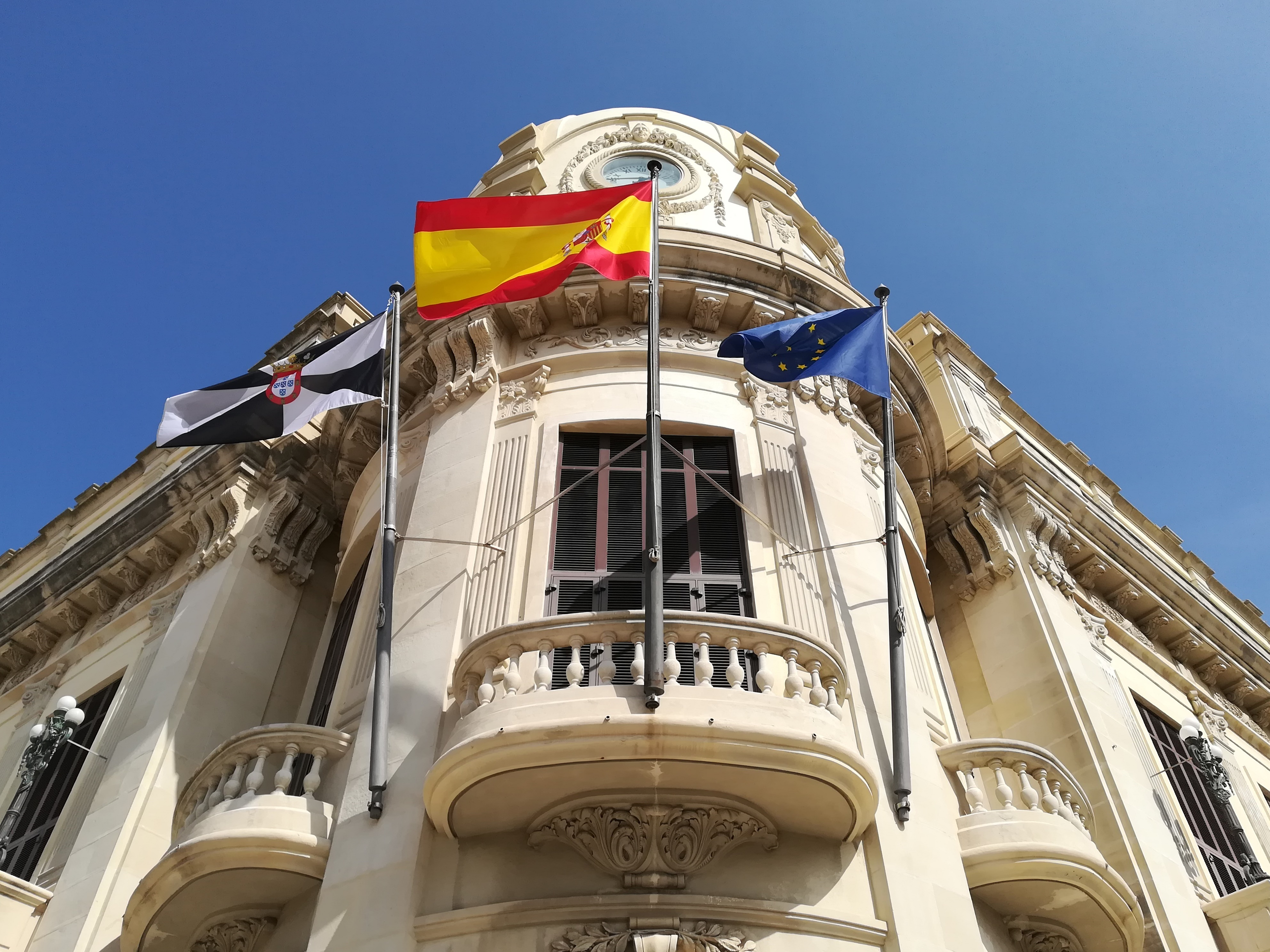
Flags of Ceuta, Spain and the EU at the Palacio de la Asamblea de Ceuta

The flag of Ceuta is the flag of the Spanish city of Ceuta, consisting of a black and white gyronny with a central escutcheon displaying the municipal coat of arms. The civil flag omits the escutcheon.

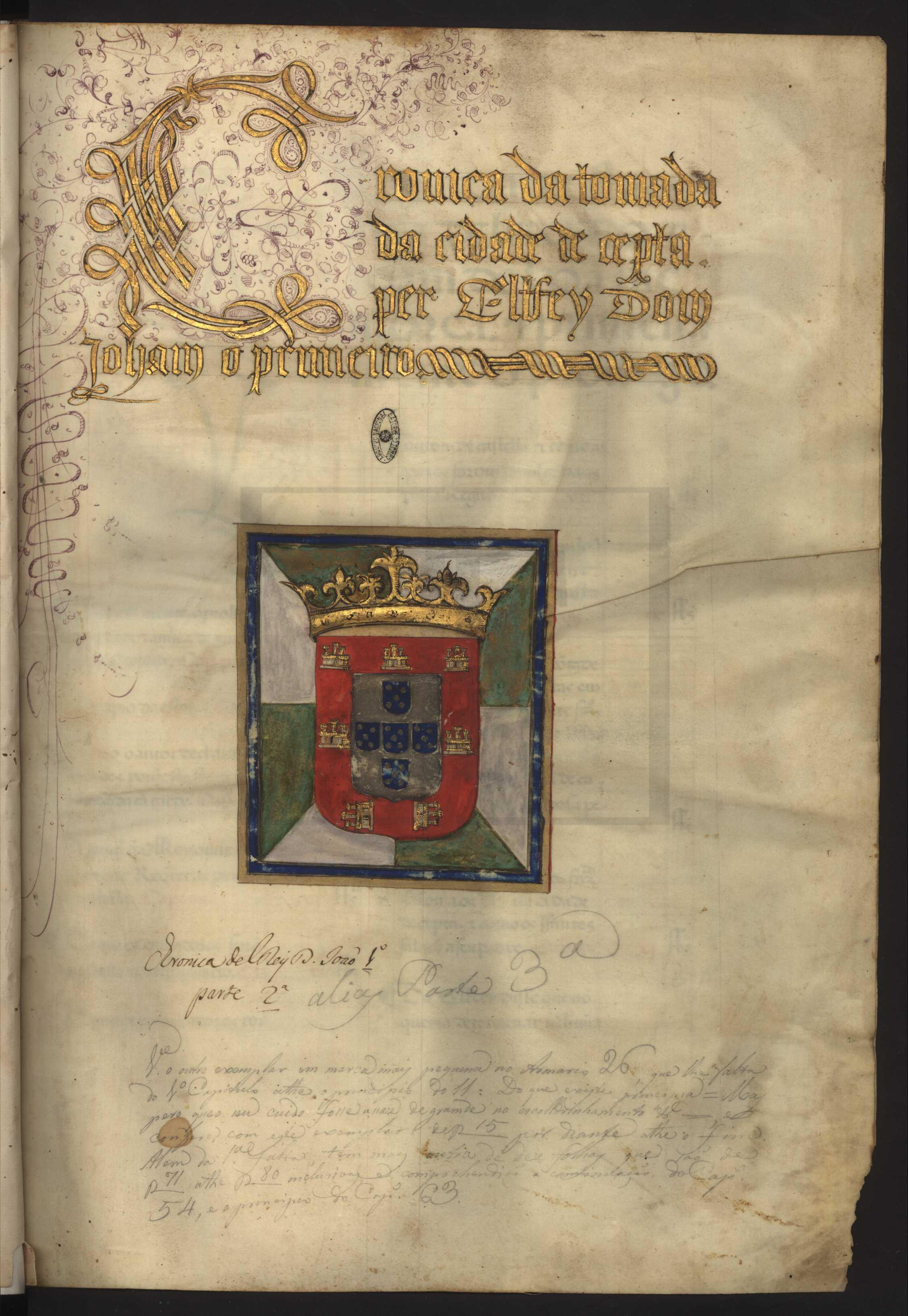
Miniature, dating from the 15th to 16th century, similar to the flag and coat of arms of Ceuta. From the "Crónica da tomada de Ceuta por D. João I, terceira parte, por Gomes Eanes de Zurara".

The gyronny field is identical to that of the flag of Lisbon, to commemorate the fact that the flag was the first to be raised in Ceuta by the Portuguese when they conquered the city in 1415. The city was a part of the Portuguese Empire until the end of the Iberian Union in 1640, after which it decided to remain with Spain. Thus the coat of arms of the city is nearly identical to that of the Kingdom of Portugal, showing the seven castles over the red bordure and the five escutcheons with silver roundels.

== See also ==
- Coat of arms of Ceuta
- Flags of the autonomous communities of Spain
