= Flag of La Rioja =

La Rioja
- Proportion: 2:3
- Adopted: 6 September 1982
- Use: Civil version without coat of arms

The flag of La Rioja is one of the symbols of the autonomous community of La Rioja, Spain. It was sanctioned for use by the former governing body of the provincial council for what was then known as the Province of Logroño in 1979 and it appears in the Statute of Autonomy of La Rioja of 1982, which specifies that the flag consist of four horizontal bands of equal size, with the colors of red, white, green, and yellow.

In addition, and similar to the flag of Spain, a coat of arms can be featured in the center of the flag, specifically the coat of arms of La Rioja. Its use is mandatory for official bodies and entities. It is considered, along with the coat of arms of La Rioja and La Rioja's anthem, one of the “symbols of Riojan identity.”

== History ==
=== Plebiscite ===
Flag of the former Provincial Council of Logroño. It was not adopted officially, but was used institutionally.

Once the provincial council declared its intent to take procedural steps towards regional autonomy, in June 1977 it opened a forum whereby the Riojan population could send its suggestions for the creation of a flag. The local newspapers—La Gaceta del Norte, among others—became interested in the idea and started a campaign from June to July 1977 to popularize the idea. Riojan politicians considered the proposal one of low priority or one that was premature. Of the 260 proposals that were received, eleven were pre-selected on the advice of the vexillologist Vicente de Cadenas y Vicent. On 5 August 1977, a general assembly was celebrated, and five of these eleven proposals were submitted for a popular vote.

Between 1 and 15 September 1977, a plebiscite was carried out and directed by Felipe Abad León, the official chronicler. Between 15,000 and 20,000 votes were submitted. Despite these efforts, the process went nowhere. Opinions and declarations that maintained that it was too early or too inappropriate to approve a flag won out; the process was stalled in part by the president of the provincial council, Julio Luis Fernández Sevilla. After this failed attempt, the question of adopting a flag was forgotten by politicians.

=== Popular movements ===
By the spring of 1977 the group of university students in Madrid known as the Colectivo Riojano had requested a flag design from the heraldic expert José María Oria de Rueda, who created various designs employing the five colors of the Riojan coat-of-arms: red, white, green, yellow, and blue.

The designs were put to a vote in September 1977, and although a flag choice was not finalized by the vote, the process did popularize the issue, which became an issue for the general public rather than just for politicians. The design that did win was one of Oria de Rueda's, but it was not officially adopted by the government.

During the Week of La Rioja in Madrid (November 1977), organized by Colectivo Riojano, a flag was created, painted with a spray can with four colors: white positioned vertically and red, green, and yellow horizontally. Subsequently, in spring of 1978, the Colectivo Riojano also distributed some oval-shaped stickers with a four-colored design, which acquired its present form. In the same year, this flag began to appear in festivals in various towns, even though it lacked official sanction. It appeared, for example, in the revived street party of San Juan in Arnedo, where it appeared for the first time atop the Peña Lubumbas.

A major impetus for the flag's adoption was its use during the celebration known as "I Día de La Rioja", celebrated in Nájera in October 1978. From that point on, various regional collectives adopted the flag for their use. In January 1979, some townspeople from Haro asked their mayor to fly the flag from the town hall, as other town halls already were flying it. The association "Amigos de La Rioja" sent a letter to the president of the provincial council asking that the flag fly from the Provincial Palace (Palacio de la Diputación).

The flag, already known by this time as the "cuatricolor", was flying from various corners of La Rioja and in many flag designs, the red colored part of the flag acquired a reddish color tone approaching that of the color of red wine.

In May 1979, the flag flew from Mount Laturce during the celebrations of the "Día de Clavijo".

=== Official sanction ===
Pressure from the public, as well as the support given by city councils across La Rioja, led to the flag being officially approved by the Riojan government. In August 1979, an inquiry on the flag was sent out to the city councils across the region, with the result that 115 approved of the flag, 51 abstained, and eight were against it.

On 14 August 1979, a plenary meeting of the Provincial Council finally approved the flag, with 17 votes for the flag by the political parties UCD and PSOE, the abstention of the Coalición Democrática (7 members). On September 15, at the festival of Our Lady of Valvanera the "cuatricolor" flew for the first time from the balcony of the Regional Council.

Subsequently, with the creation of the autonomous community of La Rioja, the flag was designated as one of the symbols of Riojan identity.

== Colors ==
=== Tones ===
The four horizontal bands that form the flag of La Rioja (without the coat-of-arms).

The colors of the flag are defined in the statute simply as “red, white, green, and yellow,” without further specifications. In 1985, the specific tones and usage were detailed in the "Programa de Identidad Corporativa". This specified the following:

- Red: Pantone Warm Red
- Green: Pantone 354
- Yellow: Pantone 109
- White: pure white, with no Pantone equivalent

However, in 2003, a new manual on the specifications was issued by the government of La Rioja.

This specified the following:

- Red: Pantone 485
- Green: Pantone 368
- Yellow: Pantone 123

The manual explained that these specifications were an adaptation, not a dramatic substitution, and that the changes in Pantone specifications were meant to be made gradually.

=== Symbolism ===
The meaning of the flag's colors is variously interpreted depending on the source, but the interpretation given in the official act of approval of the flag was:

- Red: vineyards
- White: light
- Green: orchard
- Yellow: fertility

The official meaning of the colors is given as:

- Red: wine
- White: river, sky
- Green: fields, orchards, mountains, forests
- Yellow: lands, monuments

The four colors appear, along with blue, in the coat-of-arms of the regional council.

== Use ==
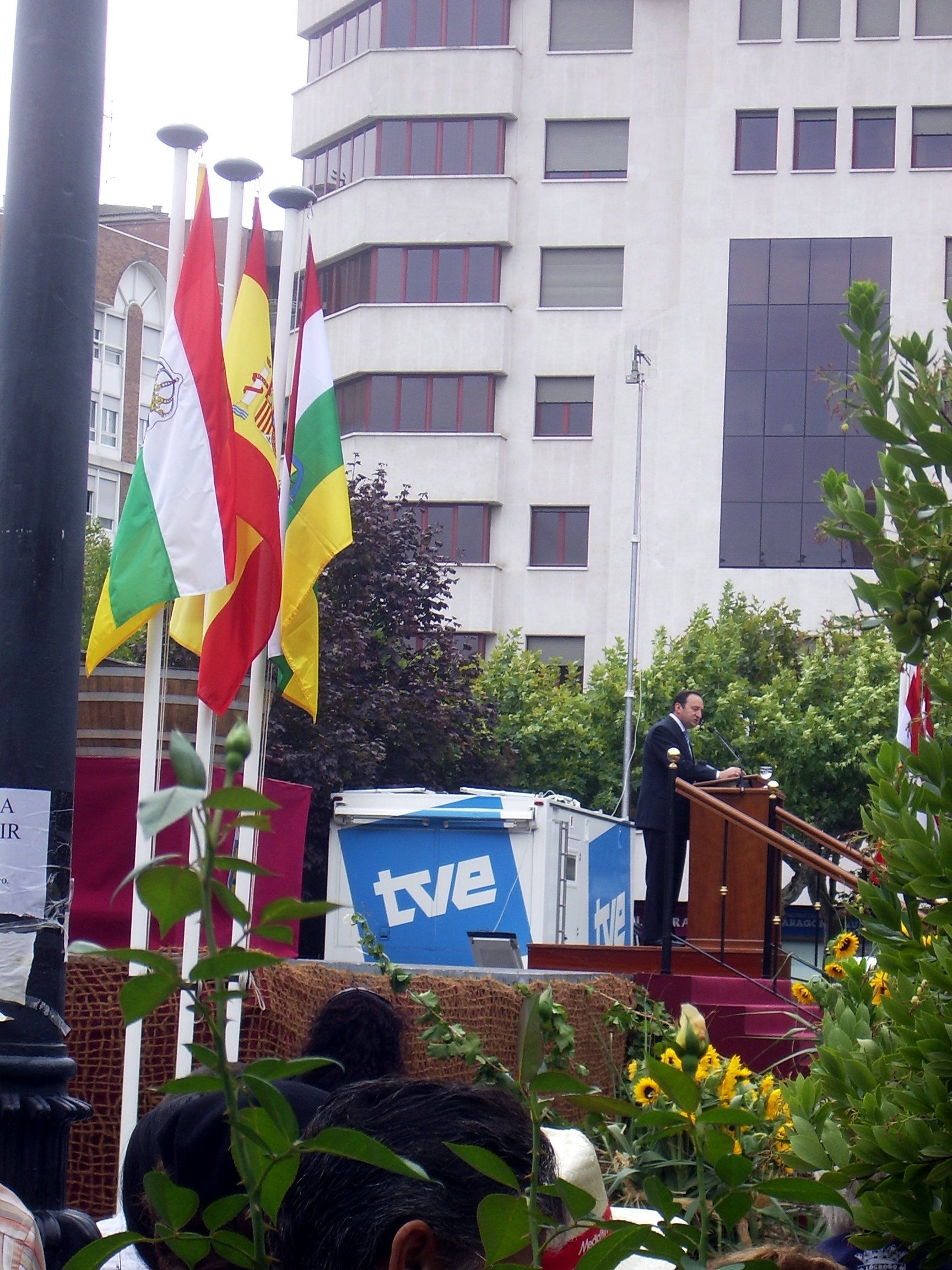
Flags of La Rioja and of Spain, during an official event featuring the community's president.

Statute 4/31 May 1985 details in Title 1 (Articles 3, 4, and 5) the correct usage of the Riojan flag:

- It will be used alongside the flag of Spain and it must fly from the outside of all public buildings in the territory of La Rioja and occupy a pre-eminent position in the interior of these buildings.
- It will be used for all official acts celebrated in the autonomous community.
- When the flag of La Rioja is used alongside that of Spain, the flag of Spain will always occupy the pre-eminent place over that of La Rioja, in accordance with the provision made in Article 6 of Statute 39/28 October 1981.

If there are an odd number of flags flying, the placement of the Riojan flag would be to the left of the Spanish flag –to the left as one looks at it. If there is an even number of flags flying, the position of the Riojan flag would be to the right of the Spanish flag, as one looks at it. The size of the flag of La Rioja cannot be bigger than that of Spain, and it cannot be smaller than the size of other flags when shown or flown together.

Article 10 states that the flag cannot be used as the principal symbol for any political party, union, business association, private entity, or person. Its use on commercial packaging and products requires authorization from the government of La Rioja.

== The Riojan flag in the media ==
- Although the flag has no official name, it is known unofficially as the "cuatricolor". An alternative name that has been proposed is the acronym "roblanvera", based on the Spanish words for the colors in the flag: rojo-blanco-verde-amarillo.

== See also ==
- Coat of arms of La Rioja
- Etymology of La Rioja
