= Anthem of the Community of Madrid =

Regional anthem

Himno de la Comunidad de Madrid
English: Anthem of the Community of Madrid
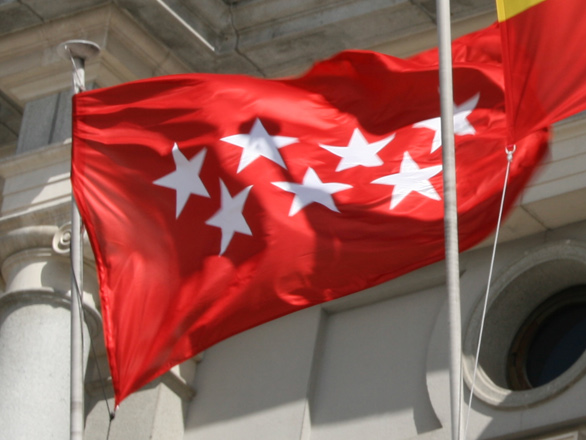
- Flag of the Community of Madrid
- National anthem of the Community of Madrid
- Lyrics: Agustín García Calvo, 1983
- Music: Pablo Sorozábal Serrano, 1983
- Adopted: 24 December 1983

Audio sample
- Anthem of the Community of Madrid: file; help

The Anthem of the Community of Madrid was written by Agustín García Calvo and composed by Pablo Sorozábal Serrano. It has been the official anthem of the Community of Madrid since 24 December 1983, when it was published in the official regional gazette.

The anthem was composed at the request of the Government of the Community of Madrid, founded in 1983. During the process of restructuration of the country's territorial organization it was decided the Province of Madrid became a single-province autonomous community. The first regional premier, President Joaquín Leguina, tasked philosopher Agustín García Calvo with the writing of the lyrics. The later accepted the challenge at the symbolic price of 1 peseta.

The lyrics sarcastically deal with the new administrative organization in Spain and with the very same existence of the Community of Madrid. Unlike the hymns of other autonomous communities, the Hymn of the Community of Madrid barely has institutional use, relegated to just some special events, such as the commemoration of the 2 May 1808 Uprising, the regional day.

== Lyrics ==
Spanish original

Yo estaba en el medio:
giraban las otras en corro
y yo era el centro.
Ya el corro se rompe,
ya se hacen Estado los pueblos,
y aquí de vacío girando
sola me quedo.
Cada cual quiere ser cada una;
no voy a ser menos:
¡Madrid, uno, libre, redondo,
autónomo, entero!
Mire el sujeto
las vueltas que da el mundo
para estarse quieto.

Yo tengo mi cuerpo:
un triángulo roto en el mapa
por ley o decreto,
entre Ávila y Guadalajara,
Segovia y Toledo:
provincia de toda provincia,
flor del desierto.
Somosierra me guarda del norte y
Sierra de Guadarrama con Gredos;
Jarama y Henares al Tajo
se llevan el resto.
Y a costa de esto,
yo soy el ente autónomo último,
el puro y sincero.
¡Viva mi dueño,
que solo por ser algo
soy madrileño!

Y en medio del medio,
capital de la esencia y potencia,
garajes, museos,
estadios, semáforos, bancos,
y vivan los muertos:
¡Madrid, metropol ideal
del dios del progreso!
Lo que pasa por ahí todo pasa
en mí, y por eso
funcionarios en mí y proletarios
y números, almas y masas
caen por su peso;
y yo soy todos y nadie,
político ensueño.
Y ese es mi anhelo,
que por algo se dice:
«De Madrid al cielo».

IPA transcription

[ɟʝo es.ˈta.βa‿en el ˈme.ðjo]
[xi.ˈɾa.βan las ˈo.tɾas eŋ‿ˈko.ro]
[i ɟʝo‿ˈe.ɾa‿el ˈθen.tɾo ‖]
[ɟʝa‿el ˈko.ro se ˈrom.pe]
[ɟʝa se‿ˈa.θen es.ˈta.ðo los ˈpwe.blos]
[i‿a.ˈki‿ðe‿βa.ˈθi.o xi.ˈɾan.do]
[ˈso.la me ˈke.ðo ‖]
[ˈka.ða kwal ˈkje.ɾe seɾ ˈka.ða‿ˈu.na]
[no‿βoj‿a seɾ ˈme.nos]
[ma.ˈðɾið‿ˈu.no ˈli.βɾe re.ˈðon.do]
[aw.ˈto.no.mo‿en.ˈte.ɾo ‖]
[ˈmi.ɾ(e)‿el su.ˈʝe.to]
[laz‿ˈβwel.tas ke‿ða‿el ˈmun.do]
[ˈpa.ɾa‿es.ˈtaɾ.se ˈkje.to ‖]

[ɟʝo ˈteŋ.go mi ˈkweɾ.po]
[un ˈtɾjaŋ.ɡu.lo ˈro.to‿en el ˈma.pa]
[poɾ lej‿o‿ðe.ˈkɾe.to]
[ˈen.tɾe‿ˈa.βi.la‿j ɡwa.ða.la.ˈxa.ɾa]
[se.ˈɣo.βja‿j to.ˈle.ðo]
[pɾo.ˈβin.θja‿ðe ˈto.ða pɾo.ˈβin.θja]
[floɾ ðel de.ˈsjeɾ.to ‖]
[ˌso.mo.ˈsje.ra me‿ˈɣaɾ.ða‿ðel ˈnoɾ.te‿j]
[ˈsje.ra‿ðe‿ɣwa.ða.ˈra.ma koŋ‿ˈɡɾe.ðos]
[xa.ˈɾa.ma‿j‿e.ˈna.ɾes al ˈta.xo]
[se‿ʝe.ˈβan el ˈres.to ‖]
[j‿a ˈkos.ta‿ð(e)‿ˈes.to]
[ɟʝo soj‿el ˈen.te‿aw.ˈto.no.mo‿ˈul.ti.mo]
[el ˈpu.ɾo‿j sin.ˈθe.ɾo ‖]
[ˈbi.βa mi‿ˈðwe.ɲo]
[ke ˈso.lo poɾ seɾ ˈal.ɣo]
[soj ma.ðɾi.ˈle.ɲo ‖]

[j‿en ˈme.ðjo‿ðel ˈme.ðjo]
[ka.pi.ˈtal de la‿e.ˈsen.θja‿j po.ˈten.θja]
[ɡa.ˈɾa.xez‿mu.ˈse.os]
[es.ˈta.ðjos se.ˈma.fo.ɾoz‿ˈβaŋ.kos]
[i‿ˈβi.βan loz‿ˈmweɾ.tos]
[ma.ˈðɾið me.tɾo.ˈpol i.ðe.ˈal]
[del djoz‿ðel pɾo.ˈɣɾe.so ‖]
[lo ke ˈpa.sa poɾ a.ˈi ˈto.ðo ˈpa.sa]
[en ˈmi‿j poɾ ˈe.so]
[fun.θjo.ˈna.ɾjos en ˈmi‿j pɾo.le.ˈta.ɾjos]
[i ˈnu.me.ɾos ˈal.mas i ˈma.sas]
[ˈka.en poɾ su ˈpe.so]
[i‿ʝo soj ˈto.ðos i ˈna.ðje]
[po.ˈli.ti.ko‿en.ˈswe.ɲo ‖]
[ˈi(‿)e.s(e)‿ez‿mi‿a.ˈne.lo]
[ke poɾ ˈal.ɣo se‿ˈði.θe]
[de ma.ˈðɾið al ˈθje.lo ‖]

English translation

I was in the middle:
they turned me around me in circles
And there I was the center.
Now the circle breaks up,
Now the peoples become states,
and here turning in the void
Alone I am left.
Each one wants to be each one;
I am not to be outdone:
Madrid, single, free, round,
autonomous, whole!
May the subject look
at the spins the world takes
just to stay still.

I have my body:
a triangle broken into the map
by law or decree,
between Ávila and Guadalajara,
Segovia and Toledo:
province of every province,
flower of the desert.
Somosierra protects me from the North
Guadarrama with Gredos;
Jarama and Henares to the Tagus
take the rest.
And thanks to this,
I am the last autonomous entity,
the pure and sincere one.
Long live my master,
that just so as to be something
I am Madrilenian!

And in the middle of the middle,
capital of the essence and power,
garages, museums,
stadiums, traffic lights, banks,
and long live the dead:
Madrid, ideal metropolis
of the god of progress!
What happens over there, all happens
in me, and because of that
civil servants in me and proletarians
and numbers, souls and masses
fall due to their own weight;
and I am everyone and no one,
political daydream.
And that is my yearning,
because there is a reason one says:
"From Madrid to Heaven!".
