= Coat of arms of Ceuta =

Coat of arms of Ceuta

Though a city of Spain, the coat of arms of Ceuta closely reflects the shield of the coat of arms of Portugal, surmounted with a crown, since that city was conquered by King John I of Portugal on 21 August 1415. The city chose to join Spain in 1640, when Portugal again became independent at the end of the Iberian Union, a period in which all the Iberian crowns were held by the Austrian House of Habsburg.

There are two principal differences between the coat of arms of Portugal and the coat of arms of Ceuta. The coat of arms of Portugal has a middle castle along the chief, which is part of the red border, while in the coat of arms of Ceuta that castle has been moved to the point of the shield. This difference can be explained by the higher status of Lisbon and other cities closer to the king as compared to Ceuta. The other difference is the crown. Though today there is no crown on Portugal's coat of arms, traditionally the crown on the coat of arms has been that of a king, while Ceuta's is that of a marquis, owed to the fact that the title of marquis had been used for governors of marches, or a country's frontier regions.

== See also ==
- Flag of Ceuta
