= Coat of arms of Extremadura =

- Armiger: Board of Extremadura
- Adopted: 1985
- Crest: A former royal crown (without arches, orb and cross)
- Shield: Quarterly: 1 León (modified field), 2 Castile, 3 Pillars of Hercules; inescutcheon, an evergreen oak
- Motto: Plus Ultra

The coat of arms of the Extremadura is described in the Title I of the Spanish Law 4 of June 3, 1985, the Law of the coat of arms, flag and regional day of Extremadura.

The official description of the arms of Extremadura according to Law 4/1985 is:

A Spanish (round) bottomed escutcheon. As crest an open coronet with eight breeches of bear or oyster plant leaves, five shown, jewelled. Half-party per pale and per fess escutcheon. In the first quarter, Or, a lion rampant armed and langued Gules. In the second, Gules, a castle Or masoned Sable. In the third, Azure, two corinthian columns Or surrounded by a ribbon Argent with the Motto «Plus Ultra», the ribbon charged with letters Gules. Wavy terrace Azure and Argent. Overall an escutcheon Argent with an evergreen oak Vert trunked.

The shield is quartered, depicting in the first quarter the rampant lion of the Kingdom of León (with the field Or instead Argent); in the second, the castle of the Kingdom of Castile; in the third the columns represent the Pillars of Hercules, adopted as badge by King Charles I; and in the escutcheon is displayed the most common tree in the region.

Almost the entire territory of Extremadura was conquered by Ferdinand II and Alfonso IX of León and the royal arms were introduced in the seal of the Badajoz. Later Extremadura was part of the Crown of Castile and the Pillars of Hercules with the motto were granted to the city during the reign of Charles I.

The official blazon has been criticised by Spanish heraldists like Pedro Cordero Alvarado. He published a detailed study of errors related both to blazon and design together with its symbolic and historical significance. This author, offered a correct heraldic description and reminded that the first quarter should be Argent, the official design of the castle is similar to a tower and the crown should have eight arches (five visible), orb and cross.

The correct blazon proposed by Pedro Cordero Alvarado is:

Per fess and in chief per pale Or a Lion rampant Gules, and Gules a triple-towered castle Or masoned Sable and ajoure Azure; in base Azure a ribbon Argent charged with the Motto 'Plus Ultra' written Gules, the ribbon accosted and conjoined two corinthian columns Or; wavy champagne of eight Argent and Azure; overall an escutcheon Argent, an evergreen oak Vert. For a Crest, a royal crown open.

The coat of arms has a ratio of 5:6. According to the text of the aforementioned Law of symbols, the coat of arms of Extremadura shall be included:

- On façades of the autonomous community administration buildings.
- In the official flag of Extremadura that flies above all organizations of the public sector in the region.
- In the official vehicles of the regional institutions.
- In diplomas and degree certificates.
- In documents, forms, stamps and letterheads in official use in the autonomous community.
- In official publications.
- In the insignia that could wear the regional authorities.
- Official places or objects of interest to be determined.
Coat of arms of the 11th Brigade Extremadura

Coat of arms of the 3rd Zone of the Guardia Civil (Extremadura)

== See also ==
- Flag of Extremadura.
