= Coat of arms of Balearic Islands =

Versions
- Escutcheon-only
- Armiger: Balearic Islands
- Adopted: 1978/1984
- Shield: Or, four pallets of gules differenced by a bendlet azure.
- Other elements: Heraldic lambrequins Or

The Coat of arms of Balearic Islands (Spanish: Escudo de las islas Baleares) is described in the Spanish Law 7 of November 21, 1984, the Law of the coat of arms of the Autonomous Community of Balearic Islands. Previously, by Decree of the Interinsular General Council of August 7 and 16, 1978, adopted the coat of arms as official symbol of the Balearic Islands.

The blazon of the arms is: Or, four pallets of gules differenced by a bendlet azure.

The shape of the shield is traditional Iberian or curved and it is embellished with lambrequins Or.

The historians Faustino Menéndez-Pidal and Juan José Sánchez Badiola find the first references to it in two rolls of arms from the latter half of the late 13th century – in Wijnbergen and in the Lord Marshal's Roll – which attributed the coat of arms to the king of Majorca. Other roll of arms, Hérault Vermandois, attributed the royal arms of Aragon and, in the late 14th century, Gelre Armorial shows it with same colors reversed, blazoned: Gules, four pallets of Or.

The bendlet azure was the mark of cadency of the cadet branch of the House of Aragon that ruled the Kingdom of Majorca. It was only used abroad until the 16th century.

The King James III's will (1349) depicts these arms. Later the arms were used by some members of the royal family of Majorca, the Crown of Aragon and the Monarchy of Spain. Cartography in the 17th and 18th centuries often shown the royal arms of Majorca. In the 19th century, is documented a marginal use as administrative symbol of the Balearic Islands. It was topped with the former royal crown (without arches). The crown has been removed from the present model.

== See also ==
- Coat of arms of the Crown of Aragon
- Coat of arms of Spain
- Flag of the Balearic Islands
- Gallery:Arms of the Crown of Aragon in heraldry
- Kingdom of Majorca
- Senyera
- Spanish heraldry
