= Manuel Gago Mariño =

Spanish journalist and scholar

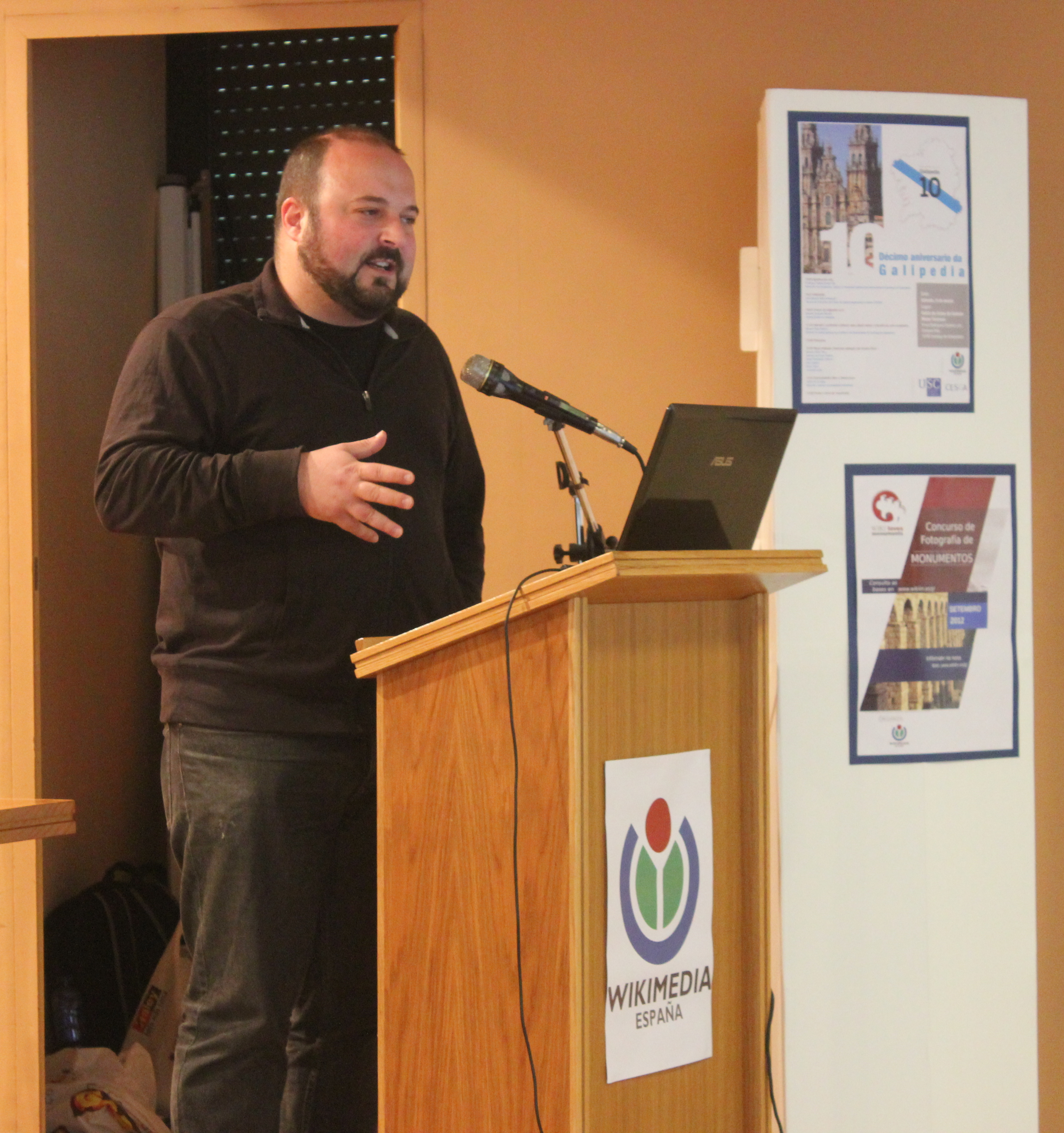
- Gago speaking at the 10th anniversary of Galipedia in Santiago de Compostela
- Born: June 22, 1976 (age 50) -->
- Occupations: Journalist and scholar

Academic background
- Education: University of Santiago de Compostela
- Thesis: 'Editorial design and information architecture in international reference cyber media' (2011)
- Website: Official website

Manuel Gago Mariño (born 22 June 1976, in Palmeira, municipality of Ribeira, Spain) is a Galician journalist and scholar.

== Background ==
He holds a doctorate in Information Sciences from the University of Santiago de Compostela. In 2011 he presented his doctoral thesis Deseño editorial e arquitectura da información nos cibermedios internacionais de referencia ("Editorial design and information architecture in international reference cyber media").

He teaches as an associate professor at the Faculty of Communication Sciences at the University of Santiago de Compostela. He teaches on subjects related to cyberjournalism. He is a member of the USC New Media Research Group. It maintains what is considered the oldest active blog of the blogomillo, Chapter 0.

As a cultural researcher, he directs the Galician Culture Council's culturagalega.org portal. In 2010, he was curator of the exhibition Ao pé do lar Museum of the Galician People.

Within the field of archaeology, he participated in the research team in the excavations of the castro da Lanzada, and directed, together with the archaeologist Antón Malde, the excavation of the A Pena Furada complex. In 2011 he created the web site Patrimonio Galego (English:Galician Heritage), and in 2012 he directed, also with Malde, another archaeological excavation, that of the Torre dos Mouros in Lira, Carnota.

== Published works ==
In Galician

- Herdeiros pola forza. Patrimonio cultural, poder e sociedade na Galicia do século XXI (in Galician) (2 ed.). 2012.
- Vento e chuvia. Mitoloxía da antiga Gallaecia (in Galician). Illustrator Manel Cráneo. Edicións Xerais. 2013.
  - Vento e chuvia. Mitoloxía da antiga Gallaecia (Edición de campo) (in Galician). Edicións Xerais. 2015. ISBN 978-84-9914-903-5.
- O anxo negro (in Galician). Edicións Xerais. 2016. ISBN 978-84-9914-985-1.
- O sangue das pantasmas. Libraría Couceiro. 2021.
- Nus. Edicións Xerais. 2021. ISBN 978-84-9121-001-6.
- Xosé López García; José Pereira Fariña., eds. (2002). Novas tendencias do xornalismo electrónico.
- Historia das historias de Galicia. Edicións Xerais. 2016. ISBN 978-84-9121-001-6.

In Spanish

- Sistemas Digitales de Información (in Spanish). Pearson Prentice Hall. 2006. ISBN 978-84-205-4225-6.
- Diseño Periodístico en Internet (in Spanish). UPV. 2007. ISBN 9788483739983.

== Gallery ==
Gago giving a talk on the tenth anniversary of Galipedia in 2013.

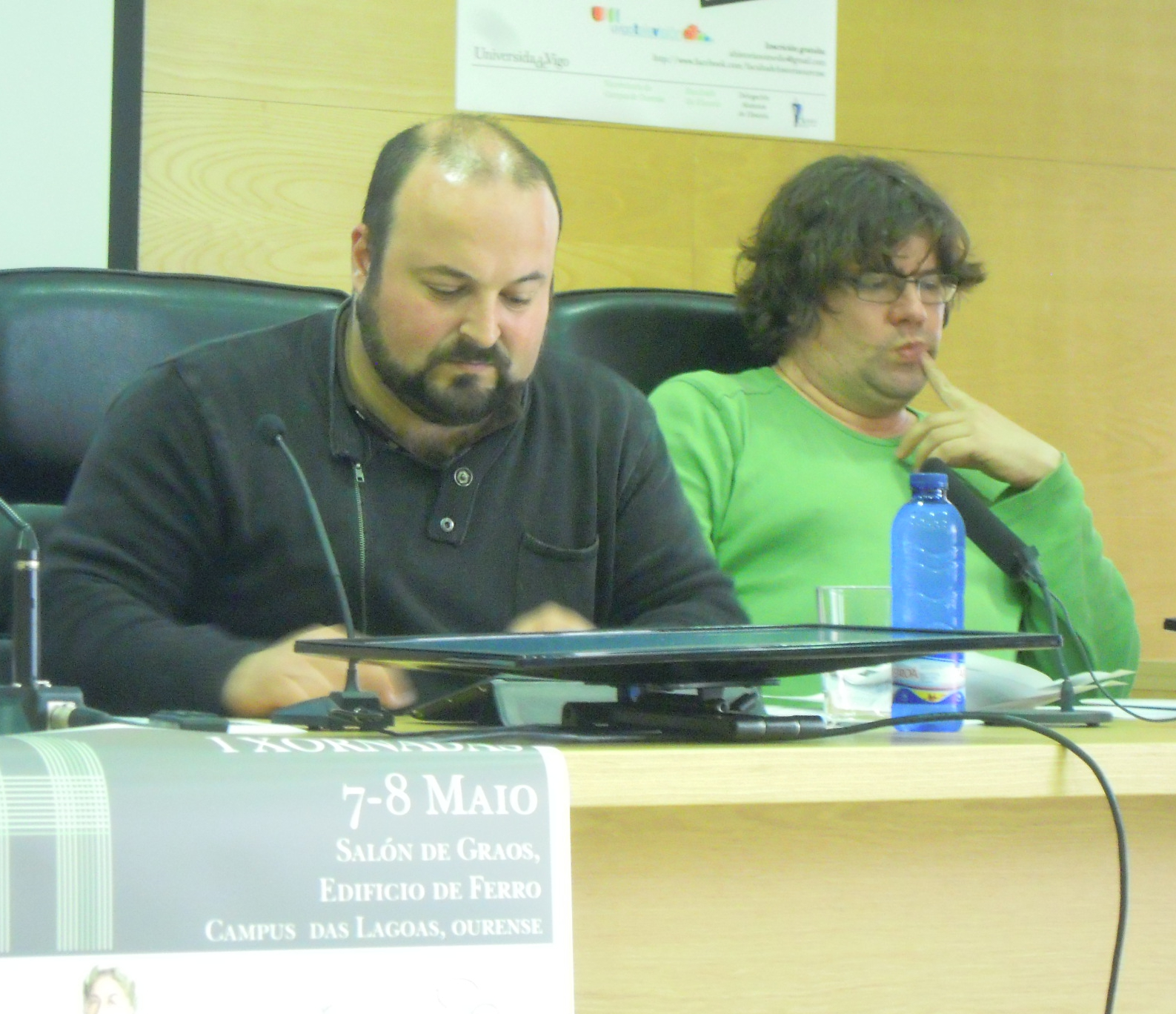
Gago (left) next to the archaeologist Xurxo Ayán.

== See also ==
- 100 Galicia centuries, Objects to tell a culture
