= Juan Francisco Masdeu =

Juan Francisco Masdeu, SJ (4 October 1744 – 11 April 1817), was a Spanish historian and scholar of Spanish literature.

== Biography ==
He was born in Palermo in 1744 to a Catalan family that served Charles III of Spain when he was King of the Two Sicilies. He lived in Italy for much of his life, and his historical vocation came rather late and was marked by his anti-Italianism. Moreover, despite being a Jesuit, he was a staunch regalist, that is, a defender of the traditions, privileges, and autonomy of the Spanish Church vis-à-vis the Pope. He joined the Company of Jesus on 19 December 1759 and became professor in the Jesuit seminaries at Ferrara and Ascoli. He visited Spain in 1799, was exiled, and returned in 1815, dying at Valencia on 11 April 1817.

His Storia critica di Spagne e della cultura spagnuola in ogni genere (2 vols., 1781–1784) was finally expanded into the Historia crítica de España y de la cultura española (1783–1805), which, though it consists of twenty volumes, was left unfinished; had it been continued on the same scale, the work would have consisted of fifty volumes. Masdeu wrote in a critical spirit and with a regard for accuracy rare in his time; but he is more concerned with small details than with the philosophy of history. Still, his narrative is lucid, and later researches have not yet rendered his work obsolete.
