= Flag of the Balearic Islands =

Flag of the Balearic Islands

The flag of the Balearic Islands is the official flag of the Balearic Islands, an archipelago and autonomous community of Spain located in the western Mediterranean Sea. The flag, which was adopted in the 1983 Statute of Autonomy, incorporates the design of the Senyera.

== Legislation and design ==
The official specification of the flag is included in the Statute of Autonomy of the Balearic Islands, passed in 1983 as the Organic Law 2/1983. The law was revised by Organic Laws 9/1994 and 3/1999. However, the article defining the community's flag remained as follows:

4th Article. 1. The flag of the Balearic Islands, made up of distinctive, historically legitimised symbols, will consist of four horizontal red bars over a yellow background, having an upper-left quarter with a purple background behind a centred white castle with five turrets. 2. Each island will be allowed to have its own flag and distinctive symbols, by agreement of their respective councils.

The most recent Statute of Autonomy, from 2007, maintained the same wording for the article which defines the flag, although it changed from the fourth to the sixth article of the Statute.

The autonomous government does not precisely specify the colours of the flag, so that the tones of yellow, red and purple often vary, although the purple is habitually chosen to be dark. Similarly, the design of the castle is not defined, and so various designs have flourished with minor differences, such as the size of the castle with respect to the quarter, or the details of their masonry. Generally, the castle is represented with a wall above which the five towers are placed, of which the central tower is often the highest.

The Draft Bill of the 1931 Statute of Autonomy of the Balearic Islands, formulated during the years of the Second Spanish Republic, although eventually not passed, merely established in its third article that: The flag of the region is that of the historical Kingdom of Mallorca. The historical flag of the Kingdom of Mallorca was taken to be that of the city of Palma de Mallorca, with two castles over a blue background. The current official flags of the Balearic Islands and Mallorca are modern creations based on this flag, and do not respect the rules of heraldry (use of purple, and a reversed castle in the case of Mallorca).

== Island flags ==
Flag of Ibiza

Flag of Formentera

Flag of Mallorca

Flag of Menorca

== See also ==
- Coat of arms of the Balearic Islands
