= Clavijo =

- Municipality
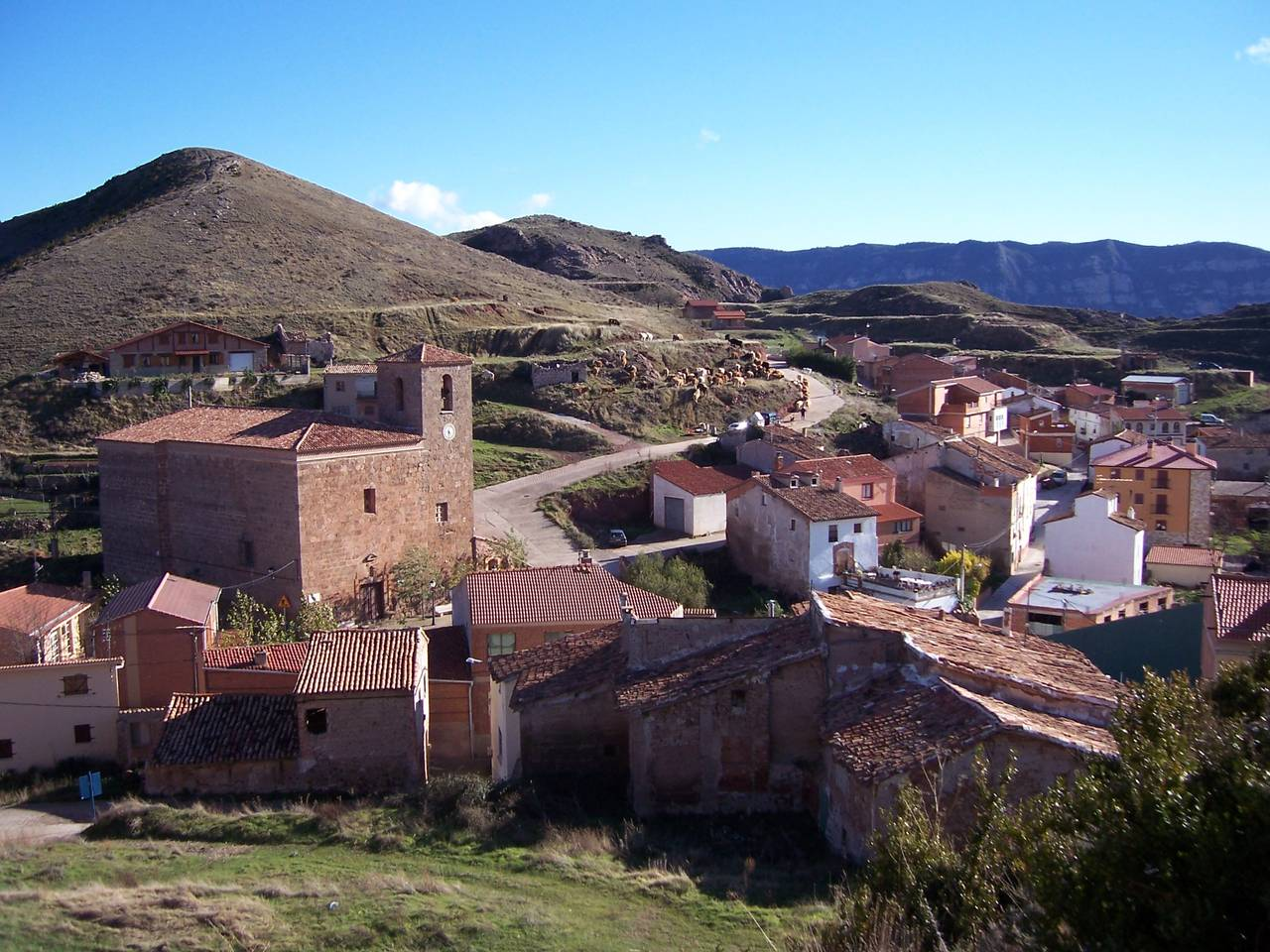

- Coat of arms

- Location in Spain
- Coordinates: 42°21′N 2°25′W
- Country: Spain
- Autonomous community: La Rioja
- Province: La Rioja
- Comarca: Logroño

Government
  - Mayor: José Fernando Porres Castillo

Area
  - Total: 19.66 km^{2} (7.59 sq mi)
- Elevation: 872 m (2,861 ft)

Population (2025-01-01)
  - Total: 294
  - Density: 15.0/km^{2} (38.7/sq mi)
- Demonym: Clavillenses
- Time zone: UTC+1 (CET)
  - Summer (DST): UTC+2 (CEST)
- Postal code: 26130
- Website: Official website

Clavijo is a municipality of the autonomous community of La Rioja (Spain). It is located near the capital, Logroño. As of 2009, its population was 276 inhabitants.

In 844, according to a 12th-century spurious charter and later traditional records, the legendary battle of Clavijo between Ramiro I of Asturias and Abd ar-Rahman II of Córdoba took place nearby.

== Main sights ==
- Castle, built by the Moors in the 9th century
- Monastery of San Prudencio de Monte Laturce, founded in the 6th century
- Hermitage of Santiago (18th century)
- Parish church (16th-17th century)
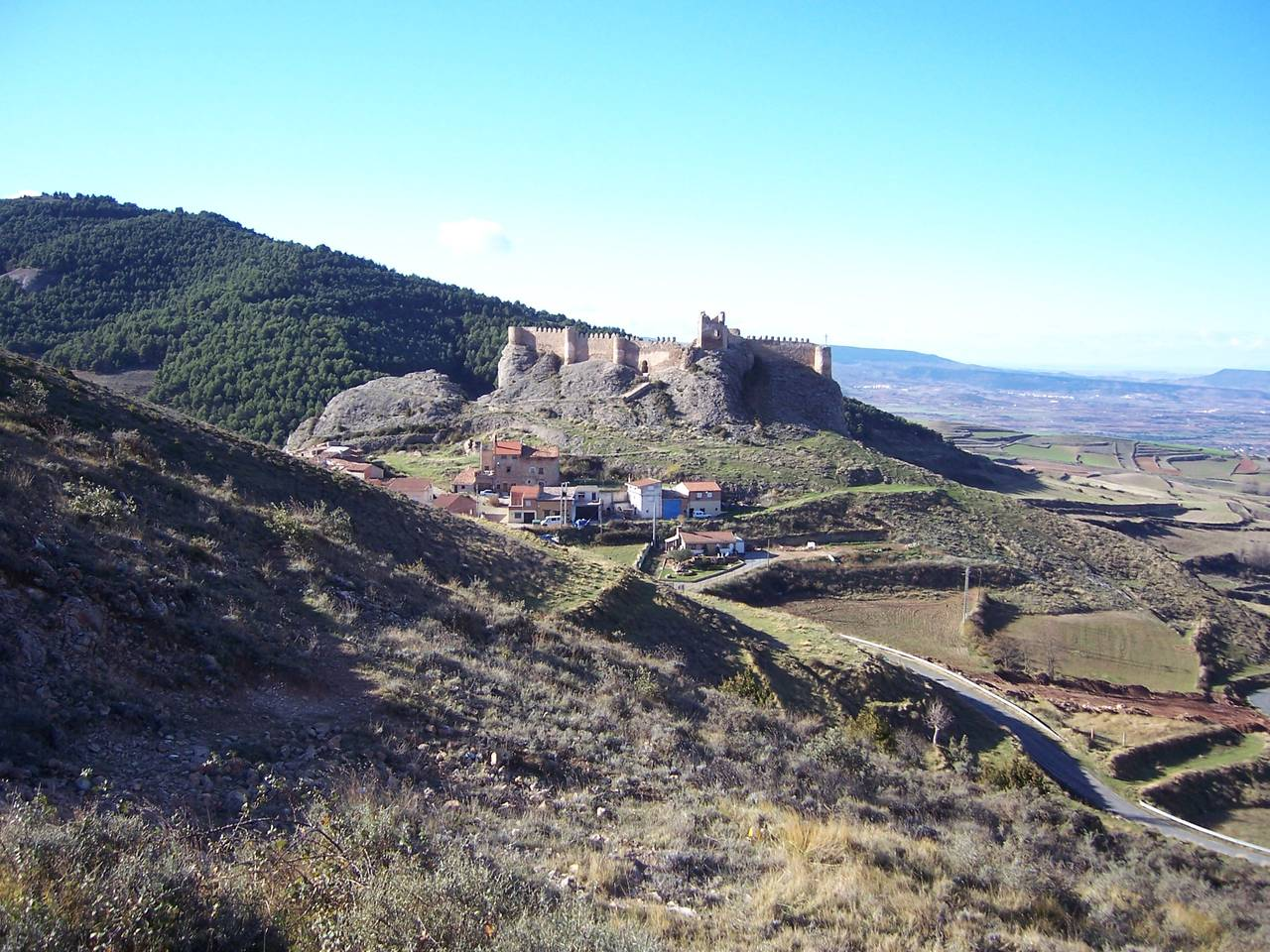
Far view of the Castle of Clavijo

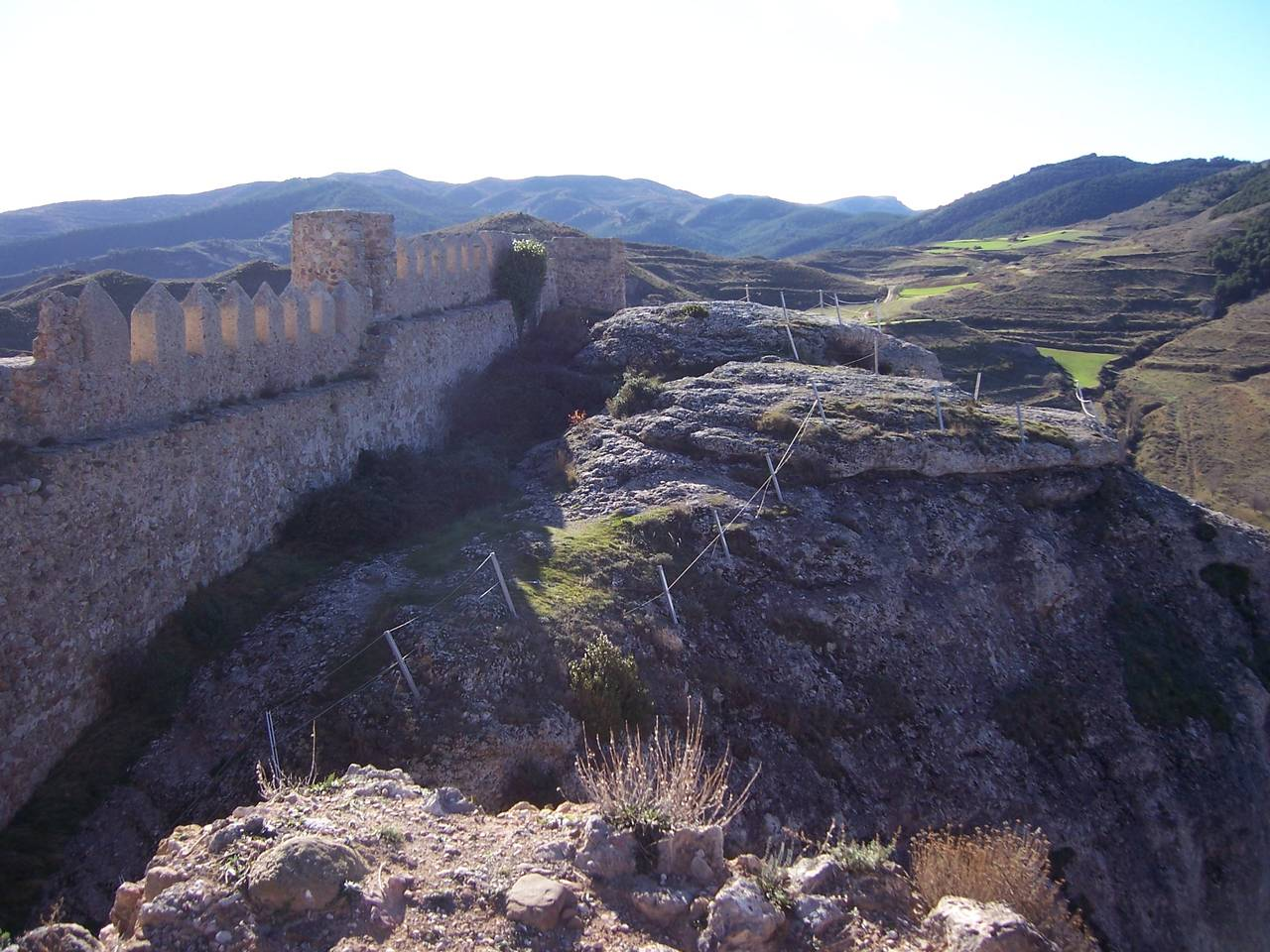
Walls of the castle

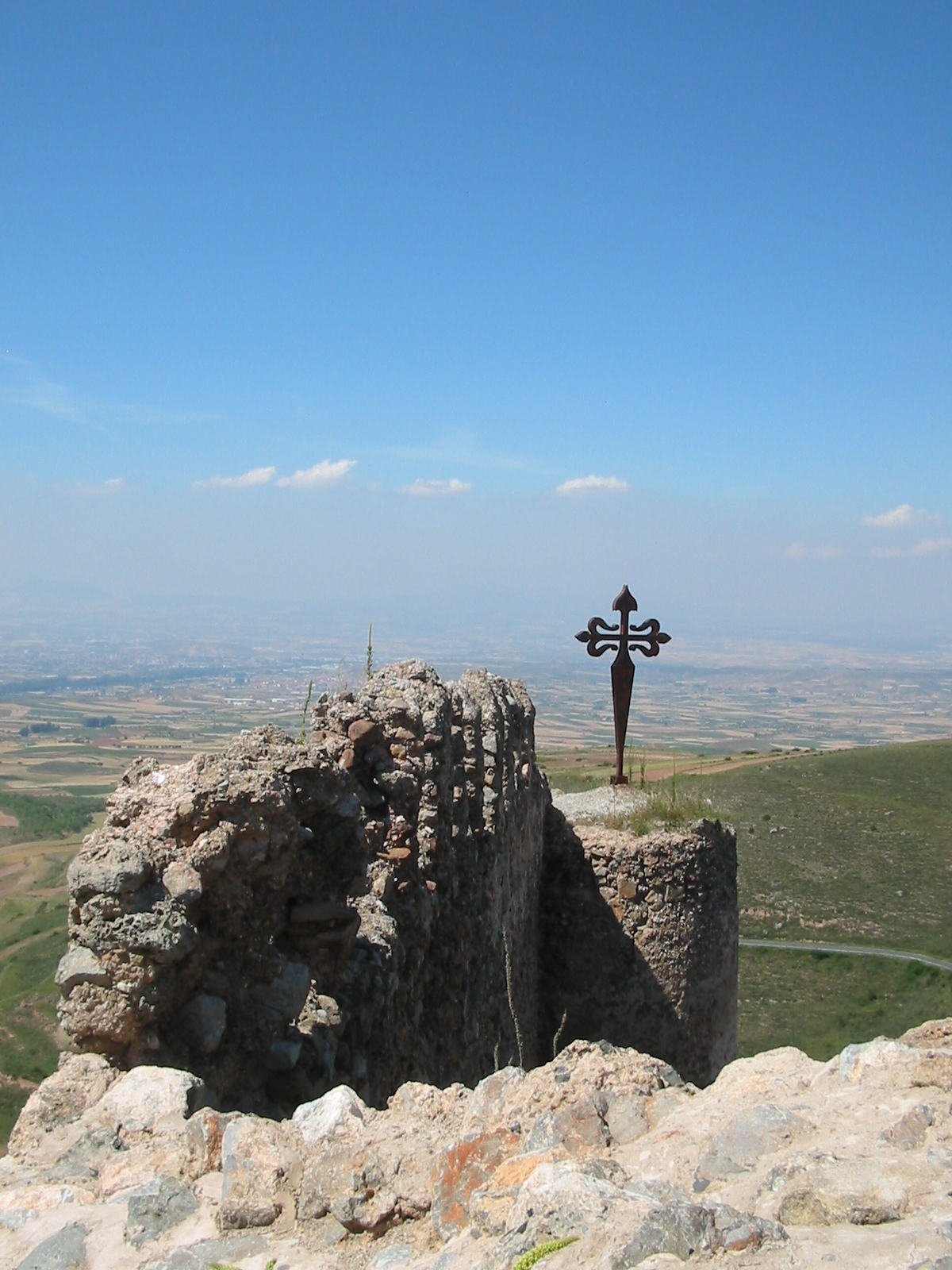
St. James's Cross
