= Coat of arms of Melilla =

Coat of arms of Melilla

The coat of arms of Melilla is that of the Ducal House of Medina Sidonia, whose titular funded the military operation that seized Melilla in 1497.

The crown is topped by a turret, with a male figure throwing a dagger (Guzmán el Bueno, ancestor of the first duke) in chief. The top part of the coat of arms reads Præferre Patriam Liberis Parentem Decet (Latin: "It is seemly for a parent to put his fatherland before his children"), also a nod to the Guzmán el Bueno's role during the 1296 defence of Tarifa on behalf of Sancho IV of Castile. The supporters are the Pillars of Hercules and read Non Plus Ultra (Latin: "Nothing further beyond").

It is the central device of the flag of Melilla, which consists of a pale blue background. The flag was adopted on 13 March 1995 when Melilla became an autonomous city of Spain.

== History ==
In January 1913, the Captain-General of Melilla Francisco Gómez Jordana requested the House of Medina Sidonia the permission to negotiate with the Government the use of the Ducal arms as coat of arms of the city. The coat of arms was granted through a Royal Decree issued in March 1913 by Alfonso XIII.
