= Armorial of Spain =

Heraldic visual designs displayed in Spain

Spain has many coats of arms: the nation has one, the reigning monarch and the heir presumptive each have one, and there are others for the institutions of state and for Spanish regions and towns.

== National ==
National Coat of arms (1981–present)

== The Royal Family ==
Coat of arms of
the King of Spain
(2014–present)

Coat of Arms of
the Princess of Asturias
(2015–present)

Coat of arms of
King Juan Carlos
(1975–present)

== Institutions ==
The Senate

The Congress

The Council of State

The General Council of the Judicial Power

Coat of Arms of the Spanish Judiciary Badges

The Customs Surveillance Service

The Body of Legal Representatives of the State

The General Council of Spanish Lawyers

The General Council of Spanish Solicitors

== Provinces ==
Image gallery
Álava

Albacete Province

Alicante Province

Almería Province

Asturias

Ávila Province

Badajoz Province

Balearic Islands

Barcelona Province

Biscay

Burgos Province

Cáceres Province

Cádiz Province

Cantabria

Castellón Province

Ciudad Real Province

Córdoba Province

Corunna Province

Cuenca Province

Gipuzkoa

Girona Province

Granada Province

Guadalajara Province

Huelva Province

Huesca Province

Jaén Province

León Province

Lleida Province

Lugo Province

Community of Madrid

Málaga Province

Murcia Region

Navarre

Ourense Province

Palencia Province

Las Palmas Province

Pontevedra Province

La Rioja

Salamanca Province

Santa Cruz de Tenerife Province

Segovia Province

Soria Province

Saragossa Province

Seville Province

Tarragona Province

Teruel Province

Toledo Province

Valencia Province

Valladolid Province

Zamora Province

=== Historical ===
Province of Albacete
(1956–1993)

Former Province of Murcia

Former Province of Santander
Province of Cádiz

1886–1927

1927–1931 and 1939–1973

1931–1939
Province of Guadalajara

Until 1931

1931–1939

1939–1977
Province of Jaén

1871–1931

1931–1939
National Arms

1939–1977
Province of León

1833–1931 and 1938–1977

1931–1938
Former Province of Madrid

1872–1873 and 1874–c.1920

1873–1874

c.1920–1931

1931–1939

1939–1968

1968–1977

1977–1983

== Islands ==
Image gallery

Balearic Islands

Emblem of the Council of Mallorca
Menorca

Former Coat of Arms of Menorca
Emblem of the Council of Ibiza

Former Coat of Arms of Ibiza and Formentera

Emblem of the Council of Formentera

Former Emblem of Formentera

Canary Islands
Las Palmas Province

Gran Canaria

Fuerteventura

Lanzarote

Santa Cruz de Tenerife Province

Tenerife

La Gomera

El Hierro

La Palma

== Comarcas ==
Image gallery
Aezkoa Valley
(Navarre)

Alt Empordà Comarca
(Girona Province)

Alt Camp Comarca
(Tarragona Province)

Alt Urgell Comarca
(Lleida Province)

Añana Cuadrilla
(Álava)

Aran Valley
(Lleida Province)

Aranda Comarca
(Saragossa Province)

Arlanzón Comarca
(Burgos Province)

Ayala Cuadrilla
(Álava)

Baix Camp Comarca
(Tarragona Province)

Baix Ebre Comarca
(Tarragona Province)

Bardenas Reales
(Navarre)

Baztán Valley
(Navarre)

Berguedà Comarca
(Barcelona Province)

El Bierzo
(León Province)

Burunda Valley
(Navarre)

Campezo/Kanpezu-Montaña Alavesa Cuadrilla
(Álava)

Belchite Countryside
(Saragossa Province)

Cariñena Countryside
(Saragossa Province)

Cerdanya Comarca
(Lleida and Girona Provinces)

Calatayud Community
(Saragossa Province)

Coat of Arms of the
Conca de Barberà Comarca
(Tarragona Province)

Enkarterri
(Biscay)

Garrigues Comarca
(Lleida Province)

Gibraltar Countryside
(Cádiz Province)

Laguardia-Rioja Alavesa Cuadrilla
(Álava)

Maresme Comarca
(Barcelona Province)

Montsià Comarca
(Tarragona Province)

Noguera Comarca
(Lleida Province)

Osona Comarca
(Barcelona and
Girona Provinces)

Pallars Jussà Comarca
(Lleida Province)

Pallars Sobirà Comarca
(Lleida Province)

Pla d'Urgell Comarca
(Lleida Province)

Priorat Comarca
(Tarragona Province)

Ribera Baja del Ebro Comarca
(Saragossa Province)

Ribera d'Ebre Comarca
(Tarragona Province)

Rincón de Ademuz Comarca
(Valencia Province)

Roncal Valley
(Navarre)

Salazar Valley
(Navarre)

Salvatierra Cuadrilla
(Álava)

Segarra Comarca
(Lleida Province)

Segrià Comarca
(Lleida Province)

Trasmiera
(Cantabria)

Urgell Comarca
(Lleida Province)

Vitoria-Gasteiz Cuadrilla
(Álava)

Zuya Cuadrilla
(Álava)

Commonwealths of Municipalities

Bercian Water Municipalities Commonwealth
(León Province)

Les Valls Commonwealth
(Valencia Province)

La Yecla Commonwealth
(Burgos Province)

Zenete Marquisate Commonwealth
(Granada Province)

== Cities and Notable Towns ==
Image gallery

Villa de Madrid
Present

Madrid City

Historical

c. 1212–1222

1222–1544

1544–c.1600

c.1600–c.1650

c.1650–1859

1859–1873 / 1874–1931

1873–1874 / 1931–1939

1939–1967

1967–1982

Barcelona
Present

Coat of Arms of Barcelona
(2004–present)

Unofficial Variant with Two Pales
(2004–present)

Historical

14th-17th Centuries

Caironat [Lozenge Shaped] Variant
(14th–17th Centuries)

Two Pales Variant
(14th–17th Centuries)

Two Pales and Caironat Variant
(14th–17th Centuries)

17th–18th Centuries

c.1790–c.1870

c.1870–1931 and
1939–1984

Variant without Crest (c.1870–1931 and
1939–1984)

Two Pales Variant
(c.1870–1931 and
1939–1984)

Two Pales without Crest Variant
(c.1870–1931 and
1939–1984)

Caironat Variant
(19th Century–1931)

Version shown at the
One Hundred Hall
(1924)

1931-1939

1931-1939
(Eight-Pointed Shaped Variant)

1984–1996

1996-2004
(Seal and Ornamented Version)

1996-2004
(Common Emblem)

Entities

Coat of Arms of
Barcelona Free Trade Zone

Valencia
Present

City of Valencia
(1814–present)

Historical

1312-1377 (14th Century)

Sporadically (14th Century)

1377-1503 (14th-15th Centuries)

1503-1814 (16th-17th Centuries)

Sporadically (14th–18th Centuries)

Palma de Mallorca

Present

City of Palma

Historical

Historic Shield and Coat of Arms of the City of Palma before the 14th Century

Historic Shield and Coat of Arms of the City of Palma before the 14th Century
3 Pales Variant

Historic Coat of Arms of the City of Palma after the 14th Century

Andalusia

Seville City
Almería City

Cádiz City

Seal of Córdoba City

Granada City

Huelva City

Jaén City

Málaga City
Adra

Alcalá de los Gazules

Alcalá de Guadaíra

Alcalá la Real

Algeciras

Alhama de Granada

Alhaurín el Grande

Alhaurín de la Torre

Almonte

Almuñécar

Andújar

Antequera

Aracena

Arcos de la Frontera

Arjona

Armilla

Emblem of Ayamonte

Baena

Baeza

Bailén

Barbate

Los Barrios

Baza

Benalmádena

Berja

Camas

Carmona

La Carolina

Cazorla

Chiclana de la Frontera

Chipiona

Coín

Conil de la Frontera

Emblem of Coria del Río

Dos Hermanas

Écija

El Ejido

Estepona

Fuengirola

Gibraleón

Grazalema

Guadix

Huércal de Almería

Huércal-Overa

Huéscar

Isla Cristina

Jerez de la Frontera

Lanjarón

Lepe

Linares

La Línea de la Concepción

Loja

Lucena

La Luisiana

Mairena del Aljarafe

Marbella

Martos

Medina-Sidonia

Mijas

Moguer

Mojácar

Montilla

Montoro

Morón de la Frontera

Motril

Nerja

Niebla

Níjar

Olvera

Los Palacios y Villafranca

Palos de la Frontera

Pozoblanco

Priego de Córdoba

Emblem of Puente Genil

Puerto Real

El Puerto de Santa María

Punta Umbría

Rincón de la Victoria

La Rinconada

Roquetas de Mar

Ronda

Rota

San Fernando

Sanlúcar de Barrameda

San Roque

Santa Fe

Santiponce

Tarifa

Tomares

Torremolinos

Úbeda

Ubrique

Utrera

Vejer de la Frontera

Vélez-Málaga

Vera

Vícar

Sub-Municipal Entities

Las Navas de Tolosa
(La Carolina)

Cádiz Free Trade Zone
(Cádiz)

Historical

Historical Coat of Arms of Córdoba City
(Until 1983)

Historical Coat of Arms of Córdoba City
(Variant)

Historical Coat of Arms of Linares
(17th Century and c.1960-2015)

Aragon

Saragossa
Huesca City

Teruel City
Albarracín

Alcañiz

La Almunia de Doña Godina

Barbastro

Benasque

Borja

Calanda

Calatayud

Caspe

Daroca

Fraga

Jaca

Monzón

Sabiñánigo

Sos del Rey Católico

Tarazona

Asturias

Oviedo
Avilés

Cangas del Narcea

Cangas de Onís

Castrillón

Corvera

Cudillero

Gijón

Langreo

Llanes

Laviana

Llanera

Mieres

Pravia

Ribadesella

San Martín del Rey Aurelio

Siero

Valdés

Villaviciosa

Balearic Islands

Ibiza Town

Port Mahon

Formentera
Alcudia

Calvia

Ciutadella of Menorca

Emblem of Inca

Emblem of Llucmajor

Manacor

Marratxí

Pollença

Sant Antoni de Portmany

Sant Josep de sa Talaia

Santa Eulària des Riu

Valldemossa

Basque Country

Vitoria-Gasteiz
Bilbao

San Sebastián
Barakaldo

Basauri

Durango

Eibar

Getxo

Guernica

Hernani

Hondarribia

Irun

Lasarte - Oria

Lekeito

Mondragón

Ondarroa

Portugalete

Santurtzi

Sopuerta

Tolosa

Zarautz

Canary Islands

Las Palmas de Gran Canaria

Santa Cruz de Tenerife
Arona

Arrecife

Puerto del Rosario

San Bartolomé de Tirajana

San Cristóbal de La Laguna

San Sebastián de La Gomera

Santa Cruz de La Palma

Emblem of
Santa Lucía de Tirajana

Telde

Valverde

Cantabria

Santander
Astillero

Cabezón de la Sal

Camargo

Castro Urdiales

Comillas

Corrales de Buelna

Laredo

Piélagos

Reinosa

Rionansa

San Vicente de la Barquera

Santa Cruz de Bezana

Santillana del Mar

Santoña

Torrelavega

Castile and León

Valladolid City
Leon City
Ávila Town

Burgos City

Palencia City

Salamanca City

Segovia Town

Soria Town

Zamora City
Aguilar de Campoo

La Alberca

Almazán

Aranda de Duero

Arapiles

Arenas de San Pedro

Arévalo

Arroyo de la Encomienda

Astorga

La Bañeza

El Barco de Ávila

Los Barrios de Luna

Béjar

Seal of
Bembibre

Benavente

Boñar

Briviesca

El Burgo de Osma

Cacabelos

Camponaraya

Carrión de los Condes

Ciudad Rodrigo

Coca

Covarrubias

Dueñas

Fabero

Frómista

La Granja de San Ildefonso

Laguna de Duero

Lerma

Madrigal de las Altas Torres

Medina de Pomar

Medina de Rioseco

Medina del Campo

Medinaceli

Miranda de Ebro

Olmedo

Pedraza

Peñafiel

Peñaranda de Bracamonte

La Pola de Gordón

Ponferrada

Puebla de Sanabria

Riaza

La Robla

Rueda

Sahagún

Saldaña

San Andrés del Rabanedo

Santa Marta de Tormes

Santo Domingo de Silos

Sariegos

Sepúlveda

El Tiemblo

Tordesillas

Toro

Valencia de Don Juan

Valverde de la Virgen

Venta de Baños

Villablino

Villafáfila

Villafranca del Bierzo

Villalar de los Comuneros

Villalón de Campos

Villaquilambre

Exclave within Álava (Basque Country)

Emblem of
Condado de Treviño

La Puebla de Arganzón

Castile-La Mancha

Toledo City
Albacete City

Ciudad Real City

Cuenca City

Guadalajara City
Alcalá del Júcar

Alcázar de San Juan

Almadén

Almagro

Almansa

Argamasilla de Alba

Atienza

Azuqueca de Henares

Brihuega

Campo de Criptana

Caudete

Cifuentes

Consuegra

Daimiel

Escalona

La Estrella

Hellín

Huete

Illescas

Manzanares

Molina de Aragón

Emblem of
Mota del Cuervo

Ocaña

Pastrana

Priego

Puertollano

La Roda

San Clemente

San Martín de Montalbán

Sigüenza

Talavera de la Reina

Tarancón

Tomelloso

Valdepeñas

Villanueva de los Infantes

Villarrobledo

Catalonia

Girona City

Lleida City

Tarragona City
Badalona

Balaguer

Berga

Blanes

Cadaqués

Calafell

Cambrils

Castelldefels

Cerdanyola del Vallès

Cervera

Cornellà de Llobregat

Esplugues de Llobregat

Figueres

Gavà

Granollers

L'Hospitalet de Llobregat

Igualada

Lloret de Mar

Manresa

Mataró

Mollet del Vallès

Monistrol de Montserrat

Montblanc

Montcada i Reixac

Olot

Palamós

El Prat de Llobregat

Puigcerdà

Reus

Ripoll

Ripollet

Roses

Rubí

Sabadell

Salou

Sant Adrià de Besòs

Sant Boi de Llobregat

Sant Cugat del Vallès

Sant Feliu de Llobregat

Sant Joan Despí

Santa Coloma de Gramenet

La Seu d'Urgell

Sitges

Terrassa

Tortosa

Valls

El Vendrell

Vic

Viladecans

Vilafranca del Penedès

Vilanova i la Geltrú

Vimbodí i Poblet

Spanish exclave within France

Llívia

Historical

Historical Coat of Arms of
Tarragona Cit

Historical Coat of Arms of
Tarragona City
(1850-1892)

Historical Coat of Arms of
Cervera
(Until 2018)

Historical Arms of Vic
(16th-20th Centuries)

Extremadura

Badajoz City

Cáceres City
Mérida
Alburquerque

Almendralejo

Coria

Don Benito

Guadalupe

Jaraíz de la Vera

Jerez de los Caballeros

Medellín

Navalmoral de la Mata

Olivenza

Plasencia

Trujillo

Villanueva de la Serena

Galicia

Santiago de Compostela City
Corunna City

Lugo City

Ourense City

Pontevedra City
Arteixo

Barco de Valdeorras

Betanzos

Carballo

Ferrol

Baiona

Cangas de Morrazo

Carballino

Finisterre

Marín

Mondoñedo

Monforte de Lemos

Narón

Oleiros

Piedrafita

Ponteareas

Poyo

Redondela

Ribadeo

Ribeira

Samos

Sanxenxo

Sarria

Tui

Verín

Vigo

Vilagarcía de Arousa

Vilalba

Viveiro

Xinzo de Limia

Community of Madrid

Alcobendas

Alcorcón

Alcalá de Henares

Aranjuez

Arganda del Rey

Algete

Alpedrete

Arroyomolinos

Batres

Boadilla del Monte

Brunete

Buitrago del Lozoya

Campo Real

Cercedilla

Chinchón

Ciempozuelos

Collado Villalba

Emblem of
Colmenar de Oreja

Colmenar Viejo

Coslada

Emblem of El Escorial

Fuenlabrada

Fuentidueña de Tajo

Galapagar

Getafe

Griñón

Guadalix de la Sierra

Guadarrama

Humanes de Madrid

Leganés

Loeches

Lozoya

Majadahonda

Manzanares el Real

Meco

Emblem of
Mejorada del Campo

Miraflores de la Sierra

Moralzarzal

Morata de Tajuña

Móstoles

Navacerrada

Navalcarnero

Nuevo Baztán

Paracuellos de Jarama

Parla

Pinto

Pozuelo de Alarcón

Rascafría

Rivas-Vaciamadrid

Robledo de Chavela

Las Rozas de Madrid

San Agustín del Guadalix

San Fernando de Henares

San Lorenzo de El Escorial

San Martín de Valdeiglesias

San Martín de la Vega

San Sebastián de los Reyes

Santorcaz

Torrejón de Ardoz

Torrejón de Velasco

Torrelaguna

Torrelodones

Tres Cantos

Valdemorillo

Emblem of Valdemoro

Velilla de San Antonio

Villalbilla

Villanueva de la Cañada

Villanueva del Pardillo

Villarejo de Salvanés

Villaviciosa de Odón

Region of Murcia

Murcia City
Águilas

Alcantarilla

Los Alcázares

Caravaca de la Cruz

Cartagena

Cieza

Lorca

Mazarrón

Molina de Segura

San Javier

Torre-Pacheco

Totana

La Unión

Yecla

Navarre

Pamplona - Iruñea City
Ansoáin

Estella - Lizarra

Huarte - Uharte

Olite

Puente La Reina - Gares

Roncesvalles - Orreaga

Sangüesa

Tafalla

Tudela

Viana

Villava – Atarrabia

La Rioja

Logroño
Arnedo

Calahorra

Haro

Lardero

Nájera

San Millán de la Cogolla

Santo Domingo de la Calzada

Valencian Community

Alicante City

Castellón de la Plana City
Ademuz

Alaquàs

Alzira

Alcoi/Alcoy

Aldaia

Algemesí

Altea

Benicarló

Benicàssim

Benidorm

Biar

Borriana/Burriana

Calp

Crevillent

Dénia

Elx/Elche

Elda

Gandia

El Castell de Guadalest

Ibi

Xàtiva

Xàbia/Jávea

Jijona-Xixona

Manises

Mislata

Morella

Ontinyent

Orihuela

Orpesa/Oropesa del Mar

Paterna

Peníscola/Peñíscola

Petrer

Requena

Sagunt/Sagunto

Sant Vicent del Raspeig/San Vicente del Raspeig

Santa Pola

Segorbe

Sueca

Torrent

Torrevieja

Utiel

Vall d'Uixó

Villajoyosa/La Vila Joiosa

Vila-real

Villena

Vinaròs

Xirivella

Autonomous Cities

Ceuta

Melilla

== Law Enforcement, Rescue and Intelligence ==
Image gallery

National Police Corps

Badge of the National Police Corps (CNP)
Emblem of the Commissioner General (CGI)

Emblem of the Judiciary Police Commissioner General (CGPJ)

Emblem of the Citizen Security Commissioner General (CGSC)

Emblem of the Immigration and Customs Commissioner General (CGEF)

Emblem of the Scientific Support Commissioner General (CGPC)
Emblem of the Aviation Service (SMA)

Pilot Wings

Emblem of the Anti-riot Units (UIP)

Emblem of the EOD-CBRN Central Unit (UCDE-NRBQ)

Emblem of the Special Group of Operations (GEO)

Emblem of the Security Special Operations Groups (GOES)

Emblem of the Prevention and Reaction Unit (UPR)

Emblema of the Borders Central Unit (UCF)

Emblem of the Central Information Unit (UCI)

Emblema of the Antiterrorism Information

Emblem of the Subsoil and Environmental Protection Unit (UES)

Emblem of the Canine Guides Special Unit (UEGC)

Emblem of the Cavalry Special Unit (UEC)

Emblem of the Narcotics Central Brigade (UDYCO)

Emblem of the Central Protection Unit (UCP)

Emblem of the Organized Crime Specialised Response Groups (GRECO)

Emblem of the Transport Brigade (BM)

Badge of the Judiciary Police

Emblem of the Medicine Service (UPAS)

Emblem of the Internal Affairs Unit (UAI)

Emblem of the National Police Academy (ENP)

Emblem of the Spanish Police Foundation (FPE)

Customs Surveillance Service

Emblem of the Customs Surveillance Service (SVA)

Head of Government Office Security Department

Coat of Arms of the Head of Government Office Security Department (DSPG)

Autonomous Police Forces

Catalonia Police Force
Mossos d'Esquadra

Emblem of the Basque Police Force
Ertzaintza

Emblem of the Police Force of Navarre

Emergency and Rescue Agencies

Emblem of the Maritime Safety Agency (SASEMAR)

Emblem of the Civil Defense

Autonomous Communities Rescue Agencies

Galician Coastguard Service

Prisons

Emblem of the General Secretary of Prison Institutions (SGIP)

Intelligence Agencies

Emblem of the Intelligence Center for Counter-Terrorism and Organized Crime (CITCO)

== Royal Academies (Institute of Spain) ==
Image gallery
Emblem of the Institute of Spain
Royal Spanish Academy
Emblem of the Royal Academy of Fine Arts

Royal Academy of History

Royal Academy of Jurisprudence and Legislation

Royal Academy of Moral and Political Sciences

Royal Academy of Pharmacy

Royal Academy of Sciences

Royal Academy of Engineering

Royal Academy of Economic and Financial Science
Emblem of the Royal Academy of Medicine

Coat of Arms and Medal of the Royal Academy of Medicine
Royal Academy of Heraldry and Genealogy of Madrid
(Associated)

Royal Academy of Doctors
(Associated)

== Historical coats of arms ==
Coat of arms of the Catholic Monarchs (1475–1492)

Coat of arms of the Catholic Monarchs (1492–1506)

Coat of arms of Queen Joana
(1504–1506 1519)

Coat of arms of Philip I
(Nominal King of Castile)
(1504–1506)

Coat of arms of Charles I
(1516–1518)

Coat of arms of Charles I
(1518–1520)

Coat of arms of Charles I
(1520–1530)

Coat of arms of Charles I
(Also Holy Roman Emperor)
(1530–1556)

Coat of arms of Philip II
(1556–1558)

Coat of arms of Philip II
(1558–1580)

House of Andorra
(1580–1668)

House of Andorra
(1668–1700)

House of Bourbon (1700–1761)

House of Bourbon (1761–1868, 1875–1931)

Colours variant
(1700–1761)

Flag variant
(1785–1873, 1875–1931)

Colours variant
(1761–1808, 1812–1843)

Colours variant
(1843–1868, 1874–1931)

Coat of arms of Joseph Bonaparte (1808–1813)

Great Coat of arms of the Realm, Provisional Government
(1868–1870)

Coat of arms of the Realm, Provisional Government, Laurel wreath variant
(1868–1870)

Coat of arms of the Realm, Provisional Government, Console variant
(1868–1870)

Coat of arms of the Realm, Provisional Government, Golden Fleece variant
(1868–1870)

Coat of arms of the Realm, Provisional Government, Golden Fleece and Mantle variant (1868–1870)

Coat of Arms of Spain, 1868-1870 and 1873–1874
Used on Head of State's Seal, Bizarre Variant

Coat of arms of the Realm, Provisional Government, Pillars of Hercules variant
(1868–1870)

Coat of arms of the Provisional Government and the First Spanish Republic (1868–1870, 1873–1874)

Flag and colours variant during the First Spanish Republic
(1873–1874)

Coat of arms of Spain, reign of Amadeus, Laurel wreath variant
(1870–1873)

Coat of arms of Spain, reign of Amadeus, Pillars of Hercules variant
(1870–1873)

Colours variant, reign of Amadeus (1870–1873)

Personal coat of arms of Amadeus (1870–1873)

Personal coat of arms of Amadeus, Mantle variant (1870–1873)

Coat of arms of Spain, Laurel wreath variant
(1875–1931)

Coat of arms of Spain, Pillars of Hercules variant
(1875–1931)

Coat of arms of Spain, Golden Fleece variant
(1875–1931)

Coat of arms of Spain, Golden Fleece and Mantle variant
(1875–1931)

Colours variant (c.1920–1931)
Unusual and late use

Personal coat of arms of
Alfonso XIII 1924/1931

Coat of Arms of the Second Spanish Republic (1931–1939)

Flag and colours variant during the Second Spanish Republic
(1931–1939)

Coat of arms of Spain under Franco
(1939–1945)

Coat of arms of Spain under Franco
(1945–1977)

Coat of arms of Spain under Franco
(1945–1977)
Variant

Coat of arms of Spain under the Spanish Transition
(1977–1981)

== See also ==
- List of flags of Spain
- Symbols of Francoism
