= Flag of the Second Spanish Republic =

Flag used by the Second Spanish Republic

Second Spanish Republic
- Tricolor
- Use: Small vexillological symbol or pictogram in black and white showing the different uses of the flag
- Proportion: 3:5
- Adopted: 27 April 1931
- Bandera de la marina mercante (Civil Ensign)
- Use: Small vexillological symbol or pictogram in black and white showing the different uses of the flag
- Proportion: 3:5
- Bandera militar (Military Flag)
- Use: Small vexillological symbol or pictogram in black and white showing the different uses of the flag
- Proportion: 2:3

The flag of the Second Spanish Republic, known in Spanish as la tricolor (the tricolour), was the official flag of Spain between 1931 and 1939 and the flag of the Spanish Republican government in exile until 1977. Its present-day use in Spain is associated with the modern republican movement, different trade unions and various left-wing political movements.

== History ==
In the municipal elections of 12 April 1931, the Republicans won the popular vote in the large cities. The situation became increasingly chaotic: the Republic was proclaimed in several cities and the tricolor flag was waving in their town halls. The Spanish republican flag began to be used on 27 April 1931, thirteen days after municipal elections results led to the abolition of the monarchy and the proclamation of the Second Spanish Republic.

This same flag had been previously displayed by certain Republican groups as an alternative to the red-and-yellow flag that they identified with the Bourbon monarchy in Spain. As a result of this previous use, the young republic proclaimed in 1931 eagerly adopted this symbol.

While the events were taking place, a part of the people raised the new flag in the main squares of some large Spanish cities. Éibar, in Guipúzcoa, was the first town to hoist this banner from its Town Hall, on the 13th. Later, important cities, such as Madrid or Barcelona, followed with massive demonstrations.

The Republican flag was adopted on 27 April and presented to the army of the nation on 6 May with the following words: "The national uprising against tyranny, victorious since 14 April, has hoisted a flag that is invested by means of the feelings of the people with the double representation of the hope of freedom and of its irreversible triumph."

El alzamiento nacional contra la tiranía, victorioso desde el 14 de abril, ha enarbolado una enseña investida por el sentir del pueblo con la doble representación de una esperanza de libertad y de su triunfo irrevocable.

The Republican flag was formed by three horizontal bands of the same width, red, yellow, and dark purple. The National Flag would have the Spanish Republican coat of arms at the centre (quarterly of Castile, Leon, Aragon and Navarre, enté en point for Granada, ensigned by a mural crown, between the two Pillars of Hercules). This coat of arms originated in 1868 and had been used then by the Provisional Government and later by the First Spanish Republic. The civil ensign or merchant flag would be a simple tricolour without the coat of arms.

The term "la tricolor" to refer to the flag is reminiscent of the French tricolor which, since the French Revolution of the late 18th Century, has made a flag composed of three equal strips into the symbol of a Republic. However, having horizontal strips rather than vertical ones, as in the French flag, made it possible to preserve many elements of the previous Spanish flag, used during centuries of Monarchial rule.

During the Civil War there was also a military version of the flag with proportion 2:3 and without the coat of arms used by Republican Army units in different locations. Despite not displaying the arms, this plain flag did not correspond to the civil ensign approved in 1931 for the use of merchant ships. The International Brigades added a three-pointed red star to the yellow band of the military Republican flag.

The simplified military flag of the Second Spanish Republic was also used by the Spanish Maquis between the end of the Spanish Civil War and the early 1960s, and later by the Spanish National Liberation Front (FELN). Versions of this flag were used in the 1970s by the radical anti-Francoist groups Revolutionary Antifascist Patriotic Front (FRAP) and First of October Anti-Fascist Resistance Groups (GRAPO).

The Republican flag is now widely used by trade unions and left-wing political organizations, such as United Left, the Marxist-Leninist Party (RC) and some factions of the Spanish Socialist Workers' Party. It is also used by republican platforms.

== Colours ==
Arms of the Kingdom of León

Pendón Morado, also later used and denominated as the "Flag of the Comuneros"

The Spanish Republican Flag has three colours: red, yellow, and dark purple.

The third colour, dark purple (Spanish: morado oscuro), represents Castile and León by recalling the Pendón Morado, the ancient armorial banner of Castile. The colours of red and yellow symbolise the territories of the former Crown of Aragon. These three colours symbolised a new era for Spain in which no part thereof was excluded and all Spaniards were represented.

The flag that the Second Republic adopted as its own was the same that numerous republican groups had been using as an alternative to the rojigualda ensign, which they identified with the Bourbon monarchy in Spain. Due to this previous use, in April 1931 copies of the flag proliferated, which was adopted in a sudden way by the new provisional government. In addition to symbolizing the radical change in the government system, the inclusion of the third colour sought recognition of the people of Castilla as a vital part of a new state, under the assumption that the colours red and yellow represented the peoples of the old Crown of Aragon, and believing -erroneously- that the flag of Castile had been purple.

=== Morado ===
Morado, which is a generic word denoting the colour purple or violet, was previously a familiar colour in Spain because it is one of the Catholic liturgical colours that is displayed on vestments, altar cloths, and other ecclesiastical textile furnishings to signify certain seasons of the Catholic liturgical year, and, being a historically Catholic nation, this colour had annual and public use throughout Spain. Also, it was used during the Middle Ages as the heraldic colour of the Kingdom of Castile. The coat of arms of the Kingdom of León bore a purple lion rampant and the flag reputed to have been used in the Revolt of the Comuneros displayed a yellow castle on a purple background. Morado, however, was and is prone to variations in hue and fading from time and use, which often resulted in "morado" denoting a range of hues of purple, which presently are considered distinct colours/hues, e. g. crimson or maroon. Because it is rarely present on flags, in practice the morado of the lowest band of the Flag was coloured violet, purple (purpure), or even lilac, contingent on available materials and dyes.

In the decree of 27 April 1931 that imposes it, signed by the self-proclaimed and provisional Government of the Republic, the inclusion of the new strip is reasoned as follows:

"Today the flag adopted as national in the mid-19th century is folded. The two colors of it are preserved and a third is added, which tradition admits as the insignia of an illustrious region, the nerve of nationality, with which the emblem of the Republic, thus formed, more aptly summarizes the harmony of a great Spain. [...]"

==== Controversies ====
Spanish monarchists resented the morado of the new tricolored flag and a famous soleá was composed when the Flag began to be used. These verses also indirectly expressed dissatisfaction for the reforms of the new republican government:

Me está jodiendo el morao,
que está junto al amarillo,
debajo del colorao.

Translation:

I am bothered (Note: This translates the term joder in context, without according for its usage as a profanity.) by the morado,
that is next to the yellow,
below the red.

Modern historians, such as Margarita Márquez Padorno or Mirta Núñez Díaz-Balart, suggest that despite popular belief, the Castilian Pendón Morado never existed or that it was actually red, and the morado colour was merely for aesthetic reasons or due to a lack of historical knowledge.

Until 2001, the official badge of the Real Madrid C.F. had a purple band based either on the Castilian or Spanish republican colours which was added after the proclamation of the Second Spanish Republic in 1931. The colour of the band was changed from morado to navy blue in 2001.

== Depictions, derivatives and variants ==
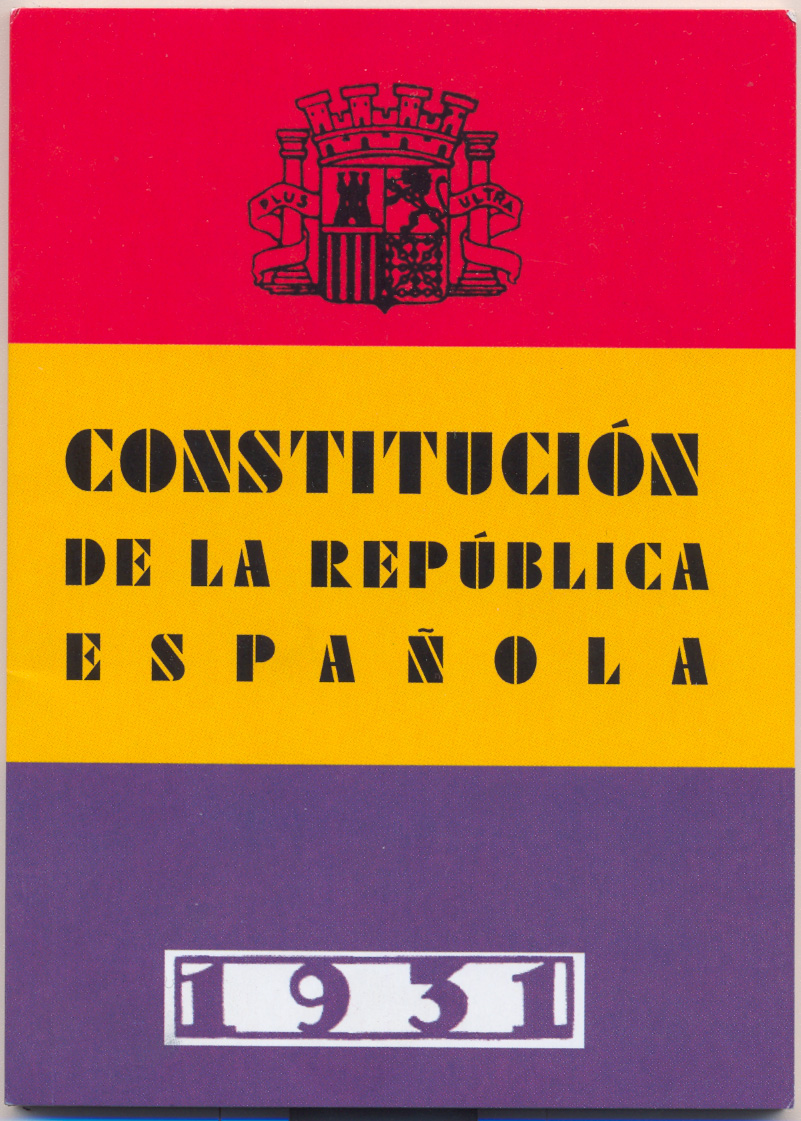
Cover of the Constitution of the Second Spanish Republic

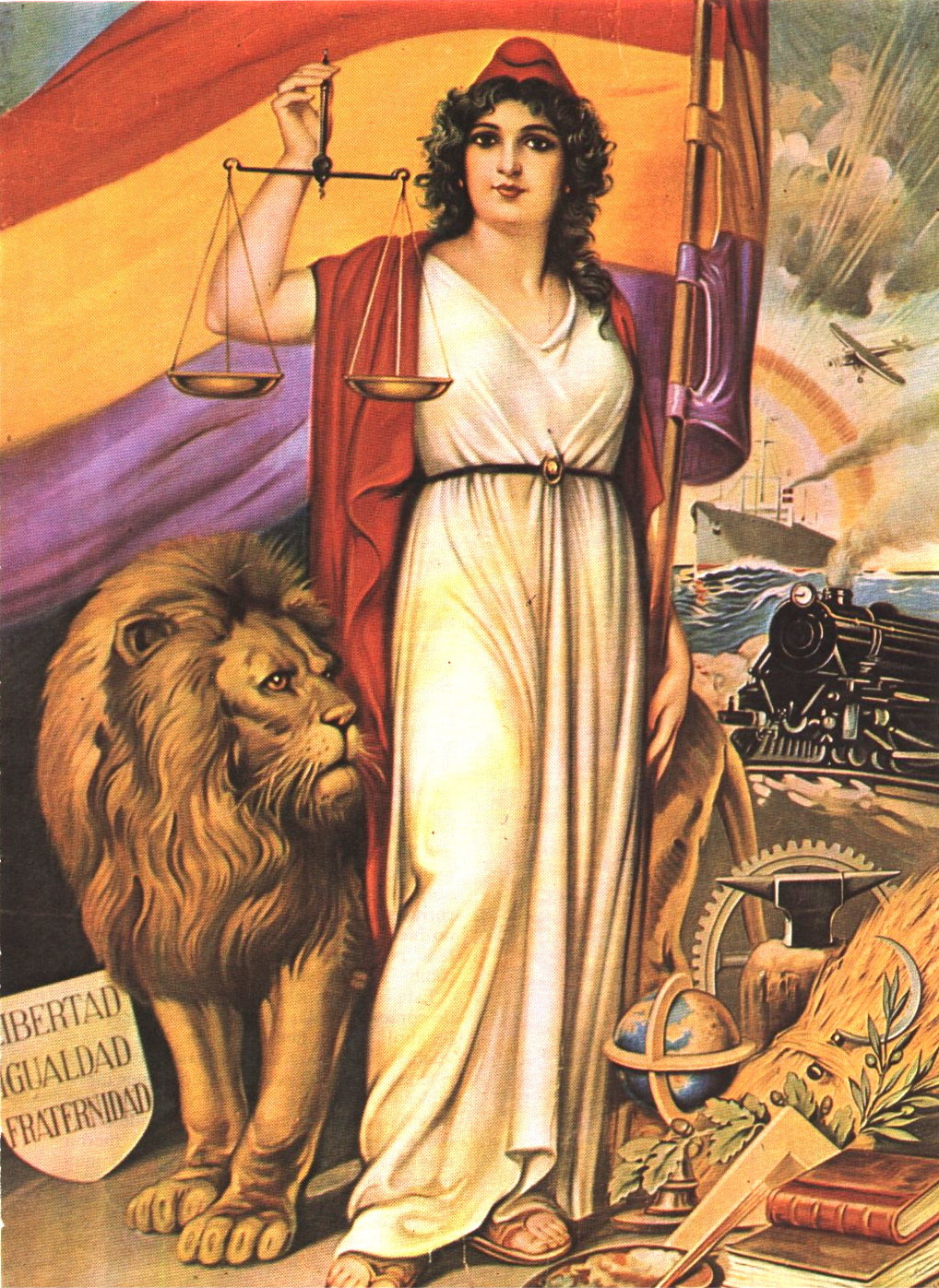
Allegory of the Spanish Republic

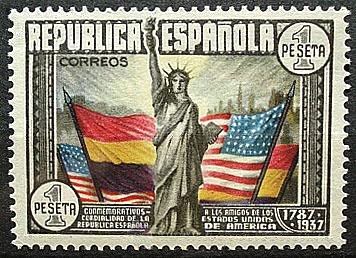
Statue of Liberty Spanish stamp honoring the 150th anniversary of the U.S. Constitution

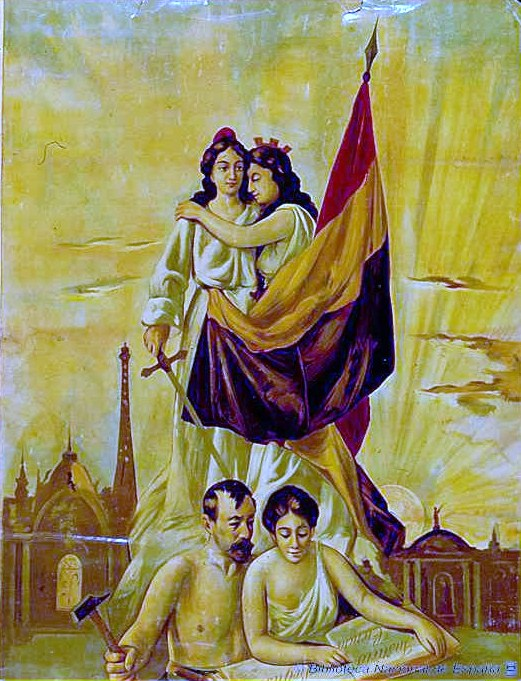
Allegory of the Spanish Republic embracing Marianne, symbolizing the French Republic. 1931

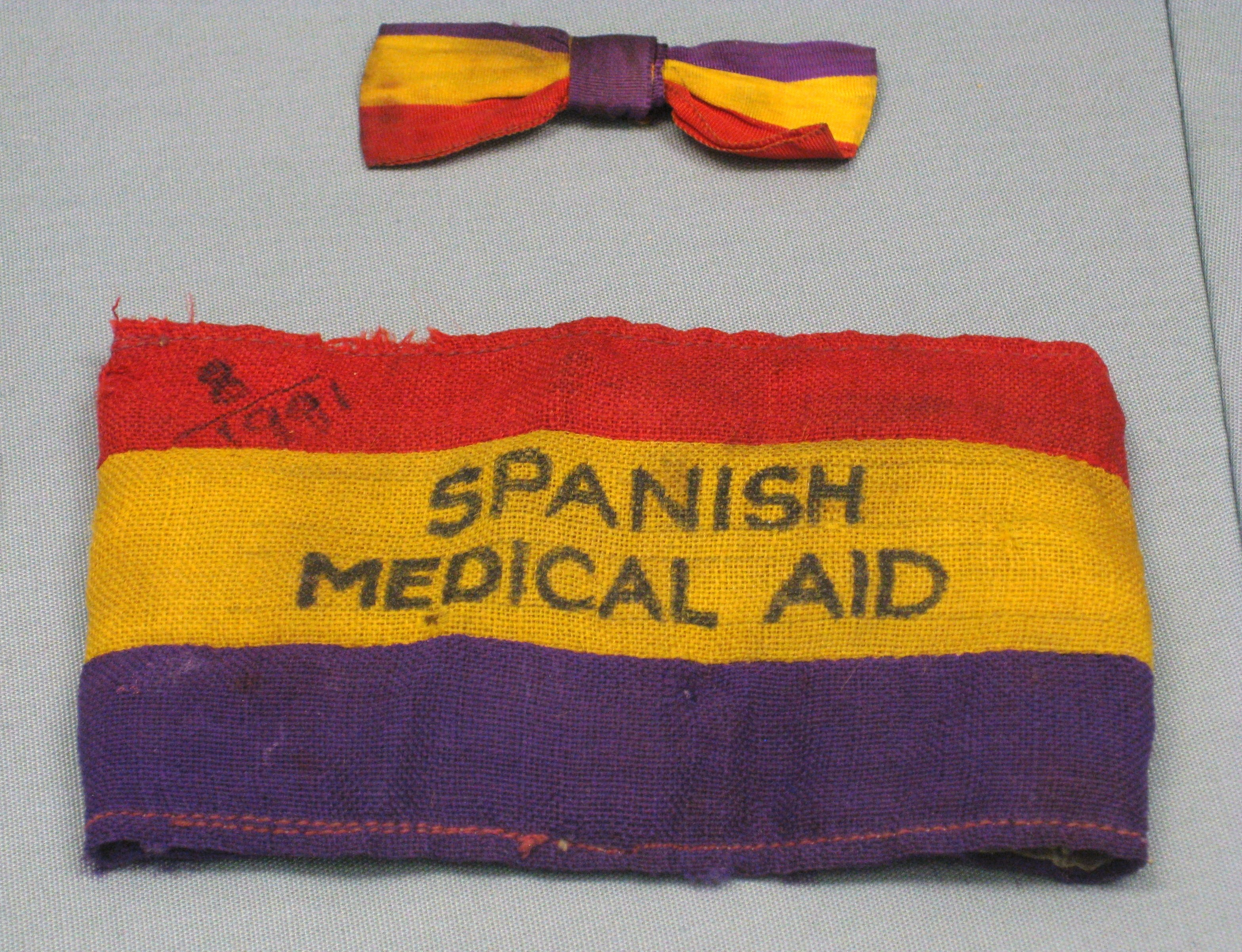
Spanish Medical Aid Committee armband

American Medical Bureau (AMB) armband

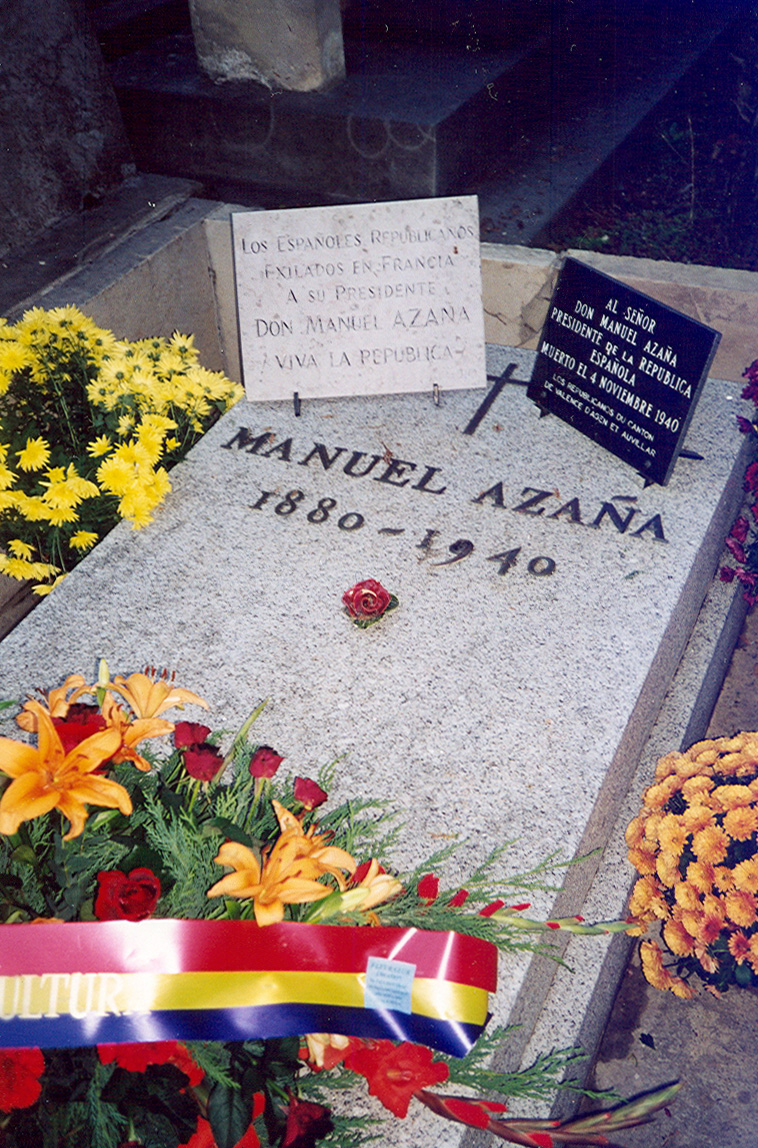
Grave of President Manuel Azaña (1880–1940) in Montauban, France

German Democratic Republic Hans Beimler Medal.

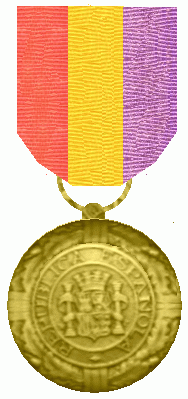
Order of the Spanish Republic in Exile

PCE(r) and GRAPO flag

PML (RC) flag

Communist alternative flag

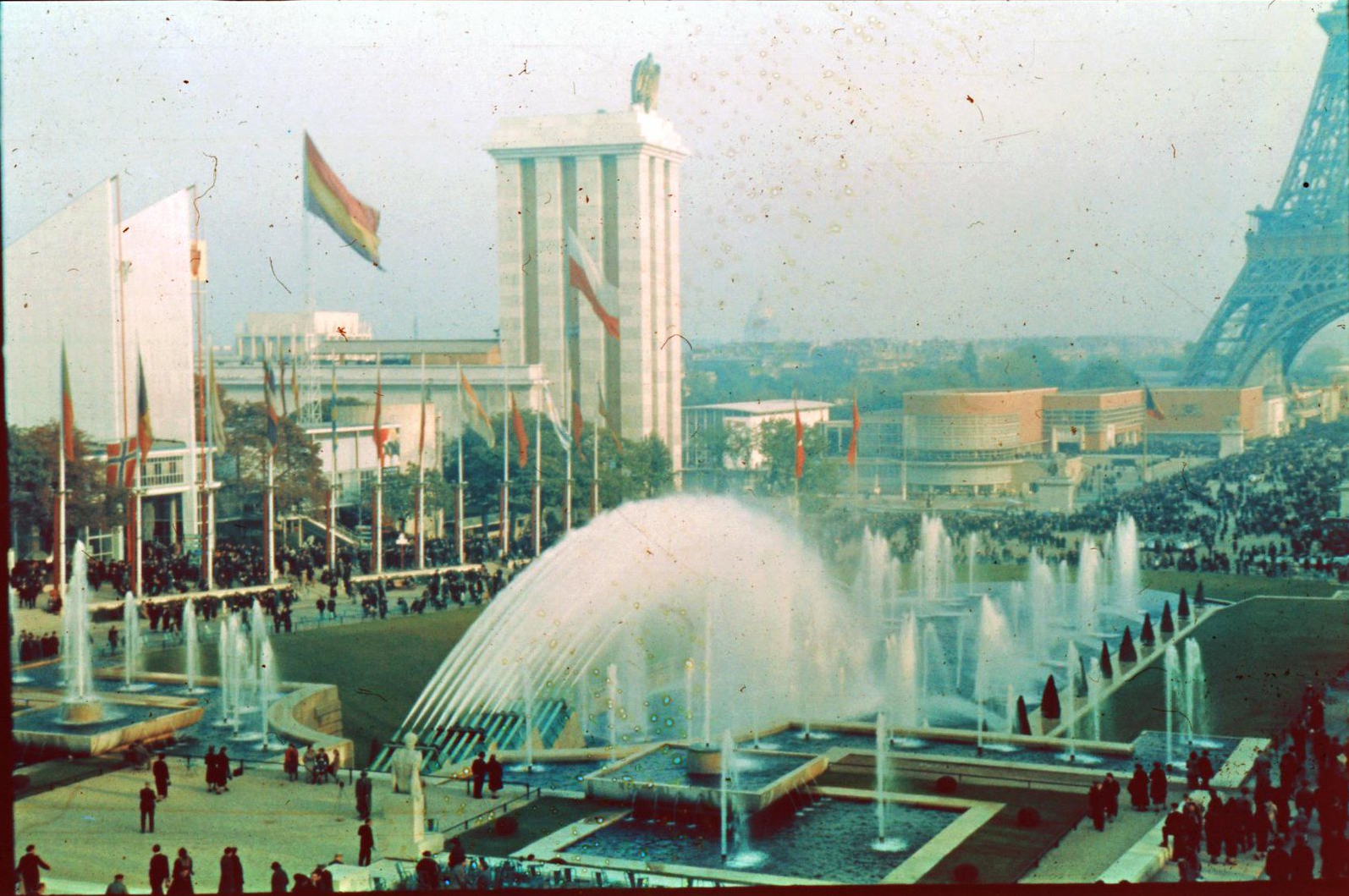
Flag of the Second Spanish Republic during the World Expo in Paris, 1937.

=== Civil use ===
Presidential Standard of Niceto Alcalá-Zamora (1931–1936)

Presidential Standard of Manuel Azaña (1936–1939)

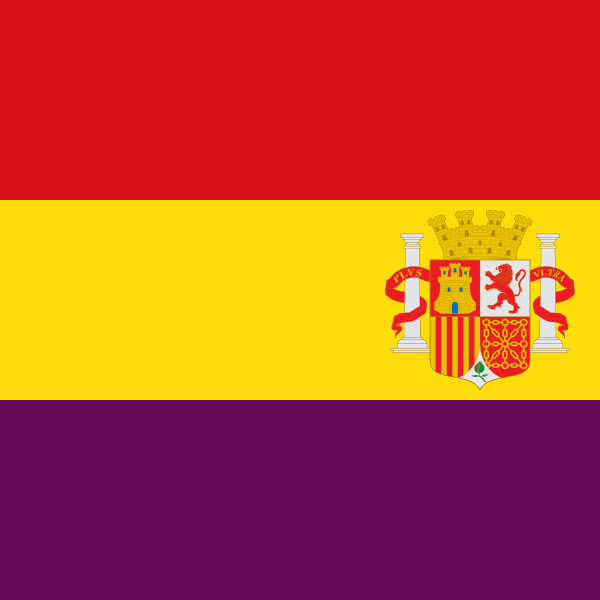
Ministerial Standard

Yacht ensign used on recreational boats or ships (1931–1939)

=== Military use ===
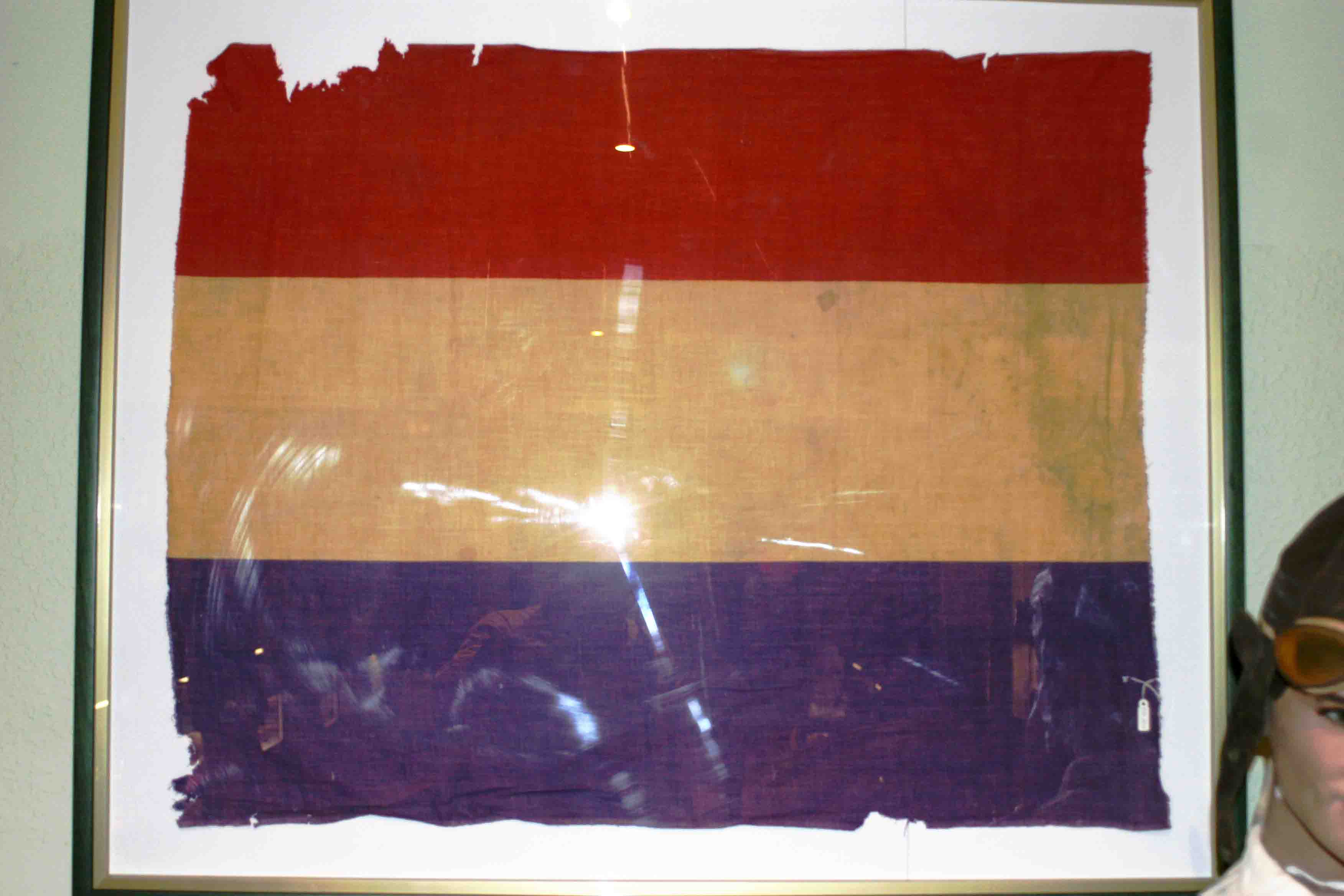
Spanish Republican Army flag used in the Battle of the Ebro

Flag of the 44th Division of the Spanish Popular Army

The flag of the International Brigades

Fin flash of the Spanish Republican Air Force

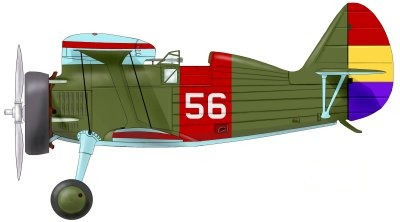
Polikarpov I-15 of the Spanish Republican Air Force

Roundel of the Spanish Republican Air Force

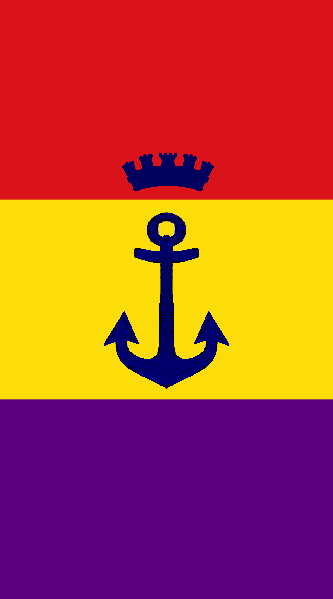
Fin flash of the Aeronáutica Naval, the naval aviation of the Spanish Republican Navy (1931–1936)

Spanish Republican Navy. Ensign of the Viceadmiral of the Fleet

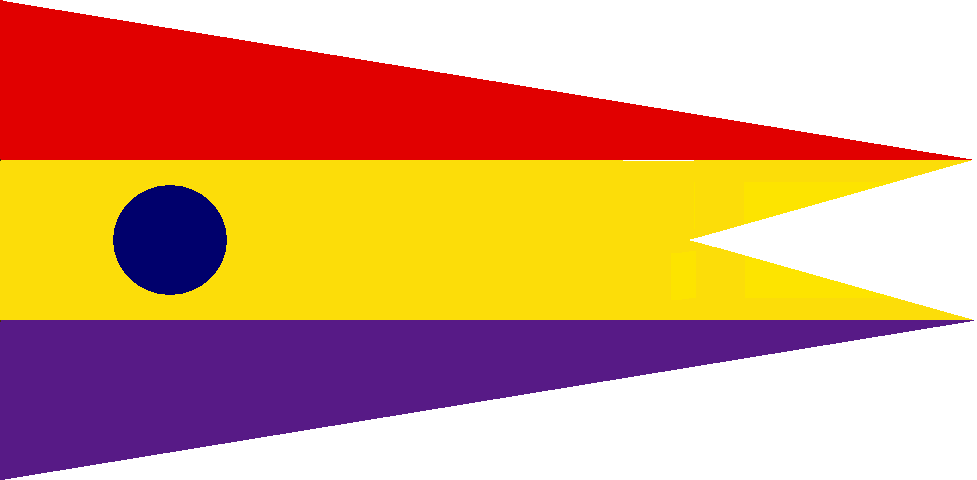
Spanish Republican Navy. Captain at Sea Pennant

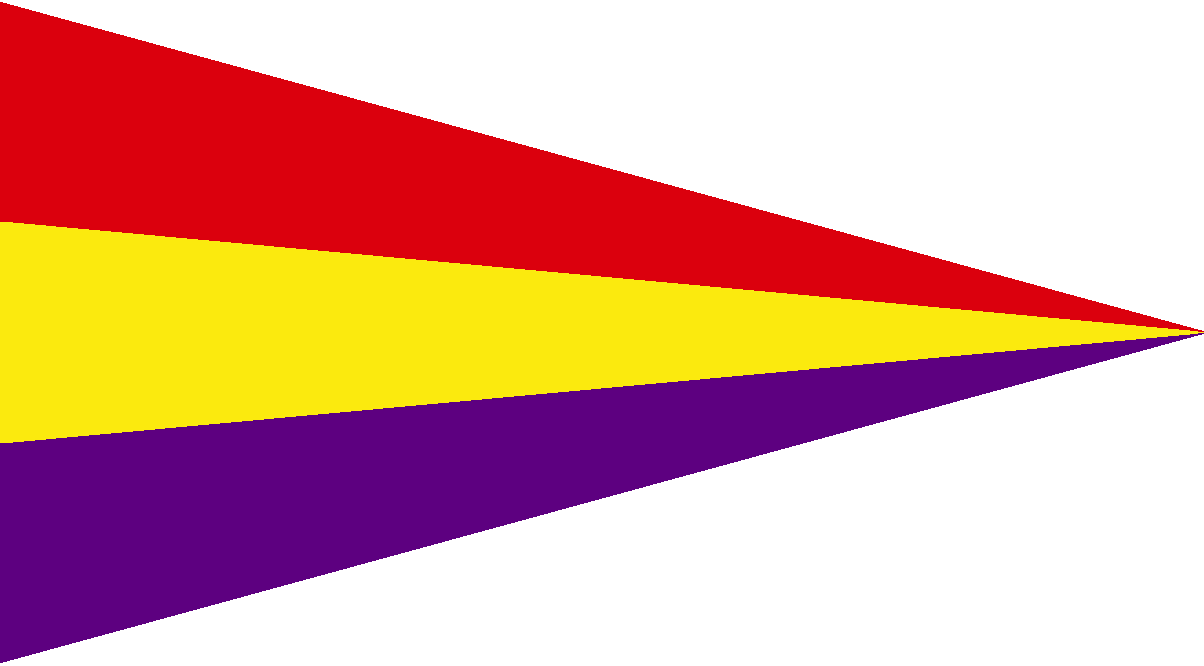
Spanish Republican Navy. Senior Officer Pennant

=== Present-day use ===
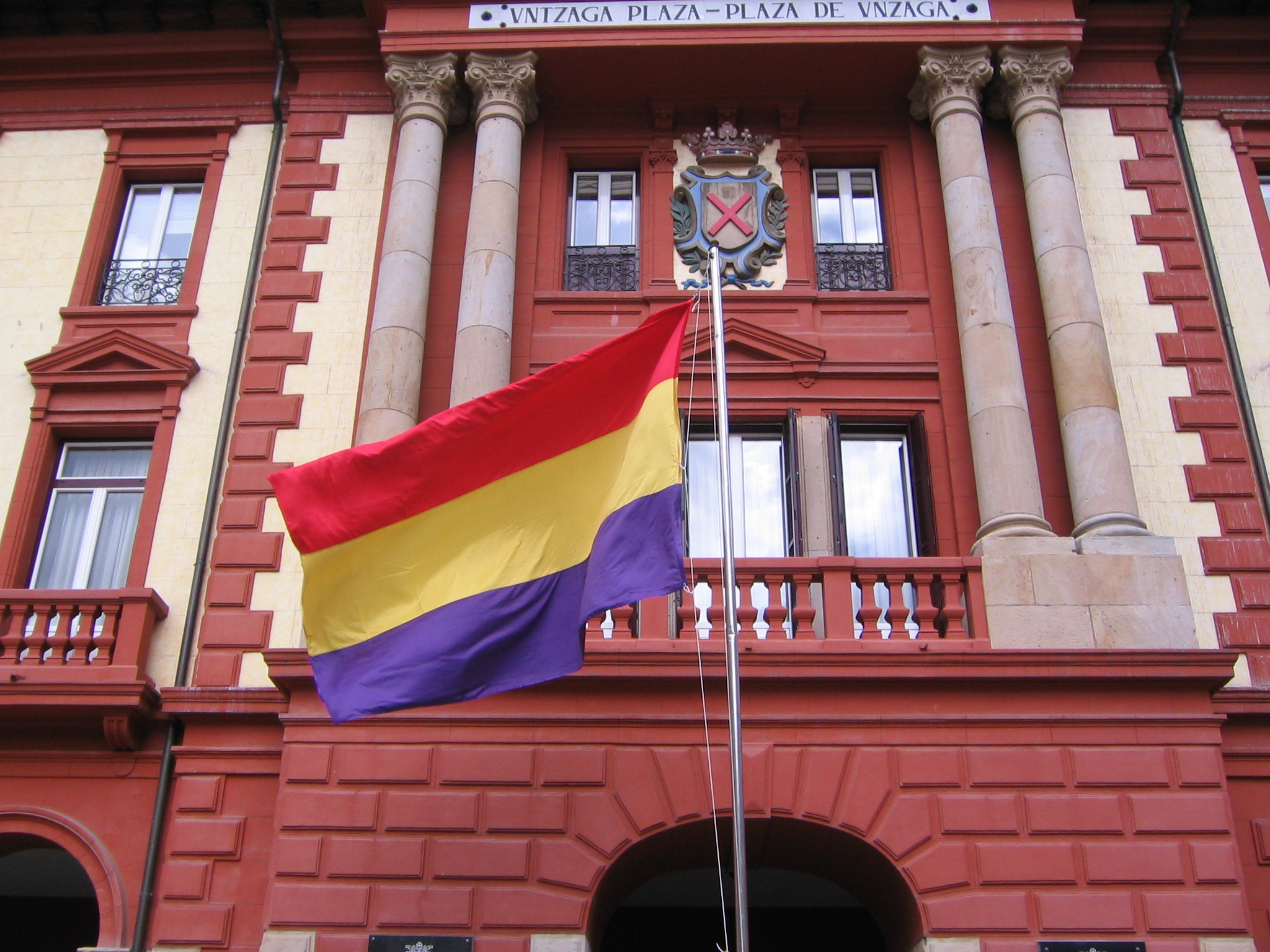
Flag of the Second Spanish Republic in Eibar

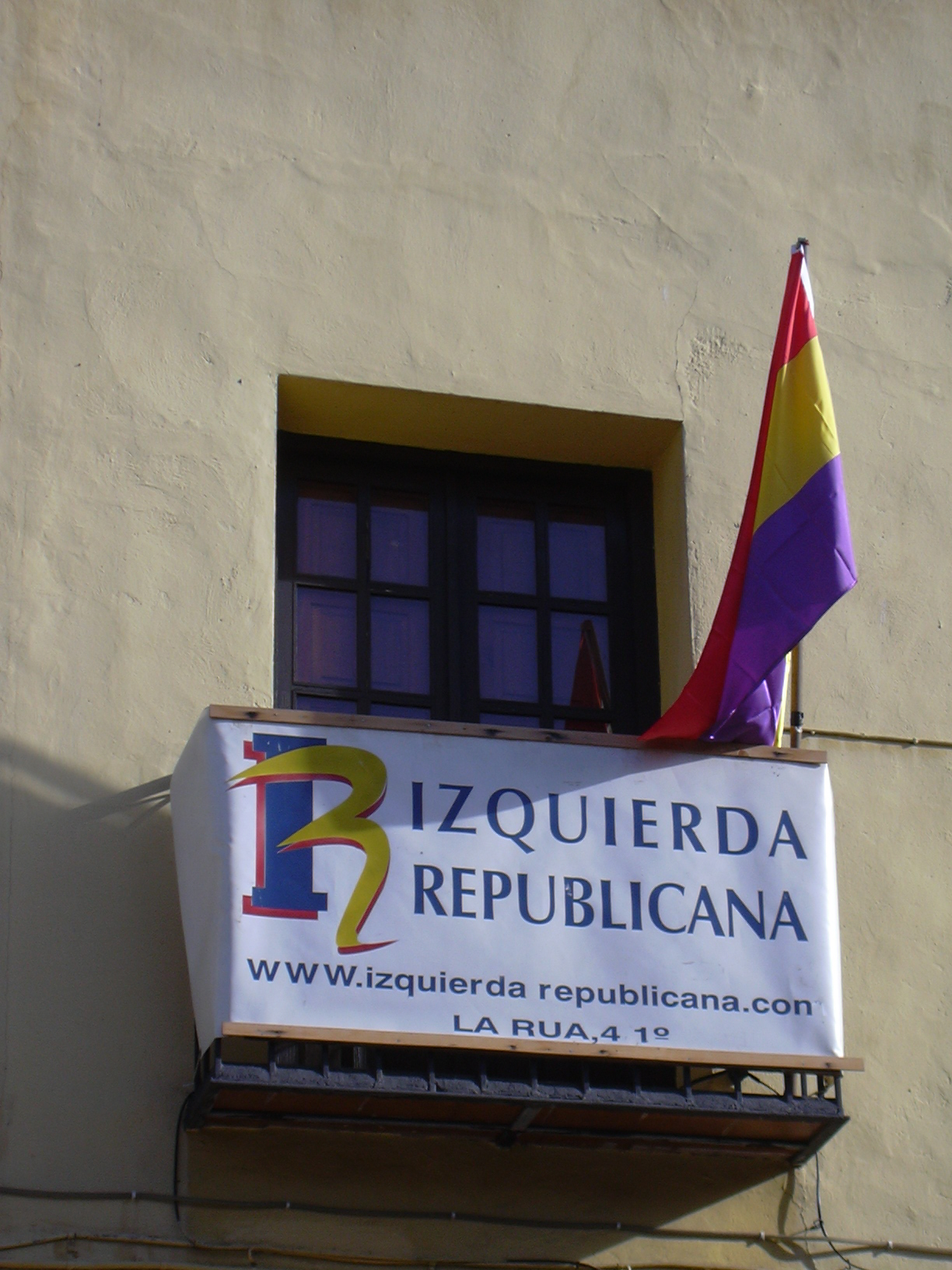
Office of the Izquierda Republicana party in León

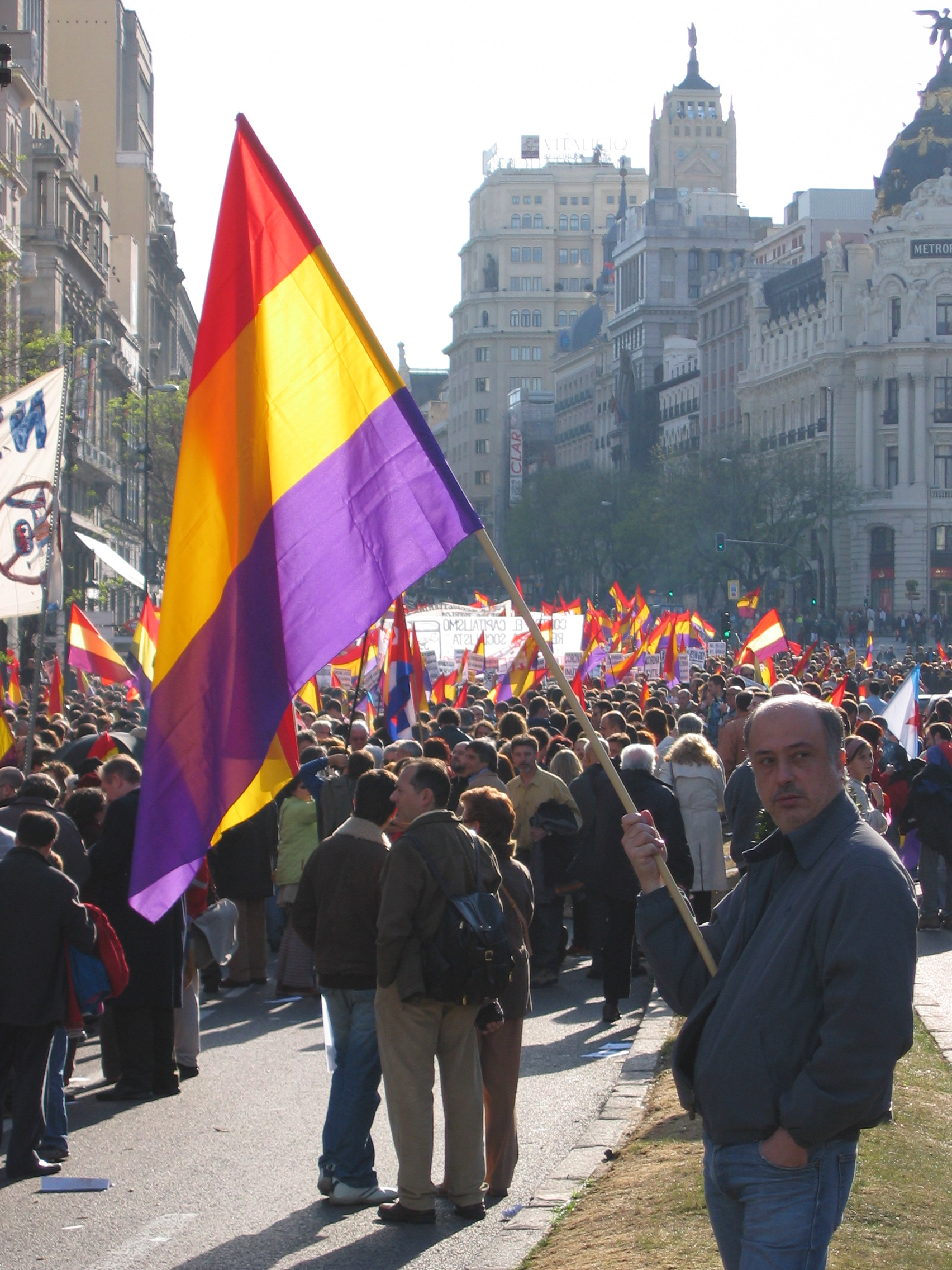
Pro-Republican demonstration; Madrid 2006

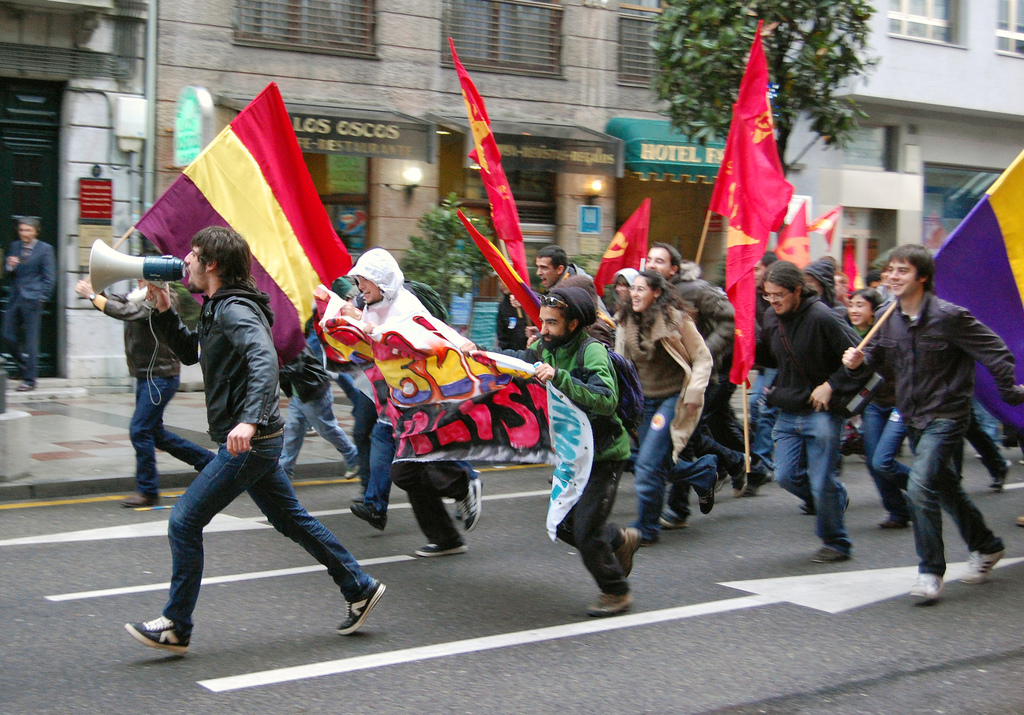
Spanish Republican flags in a demonstration in Oviedo, April 2009

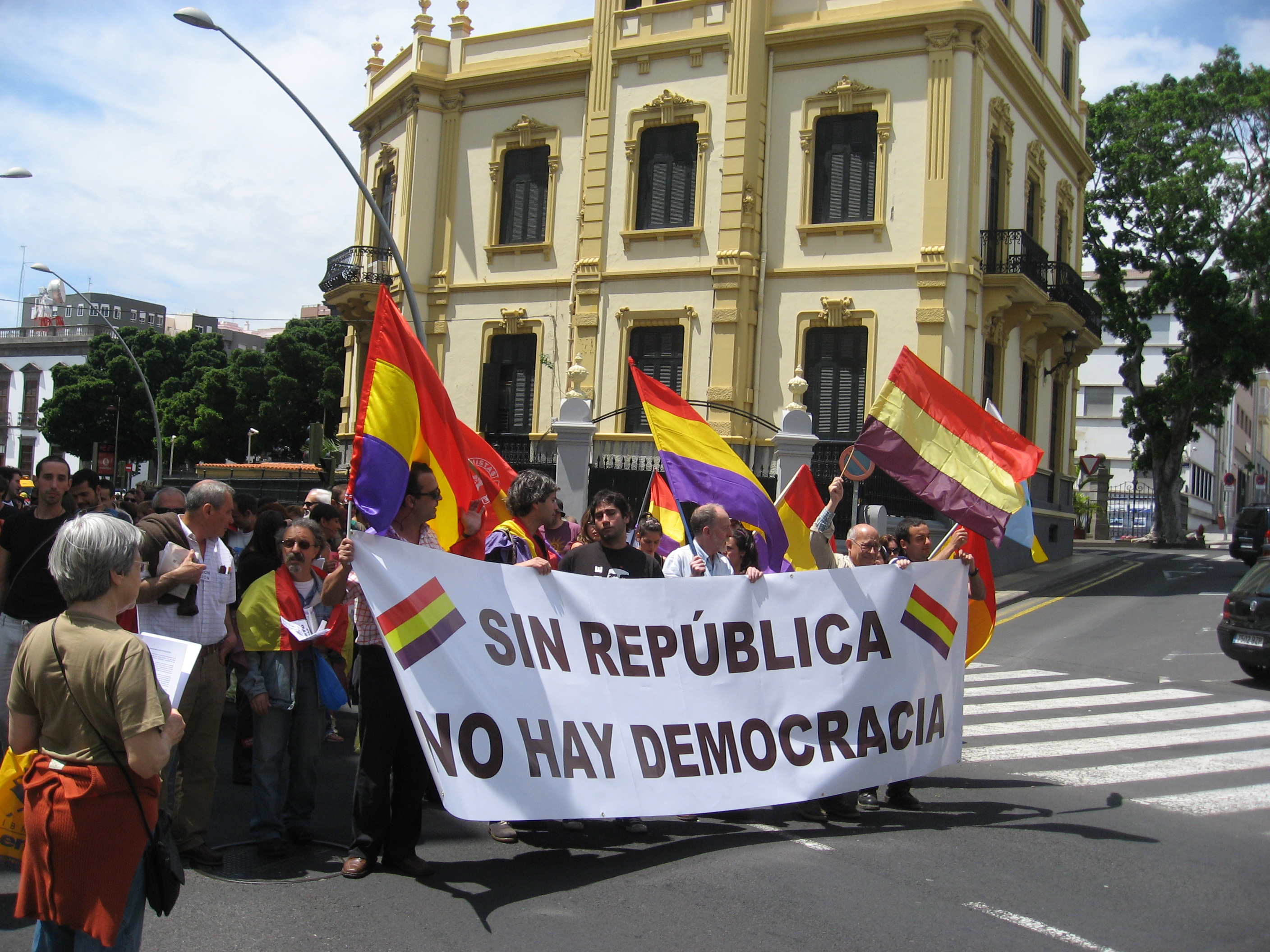
Pro-Republican demonstration in Tenerife, Canary Islands, April 2007

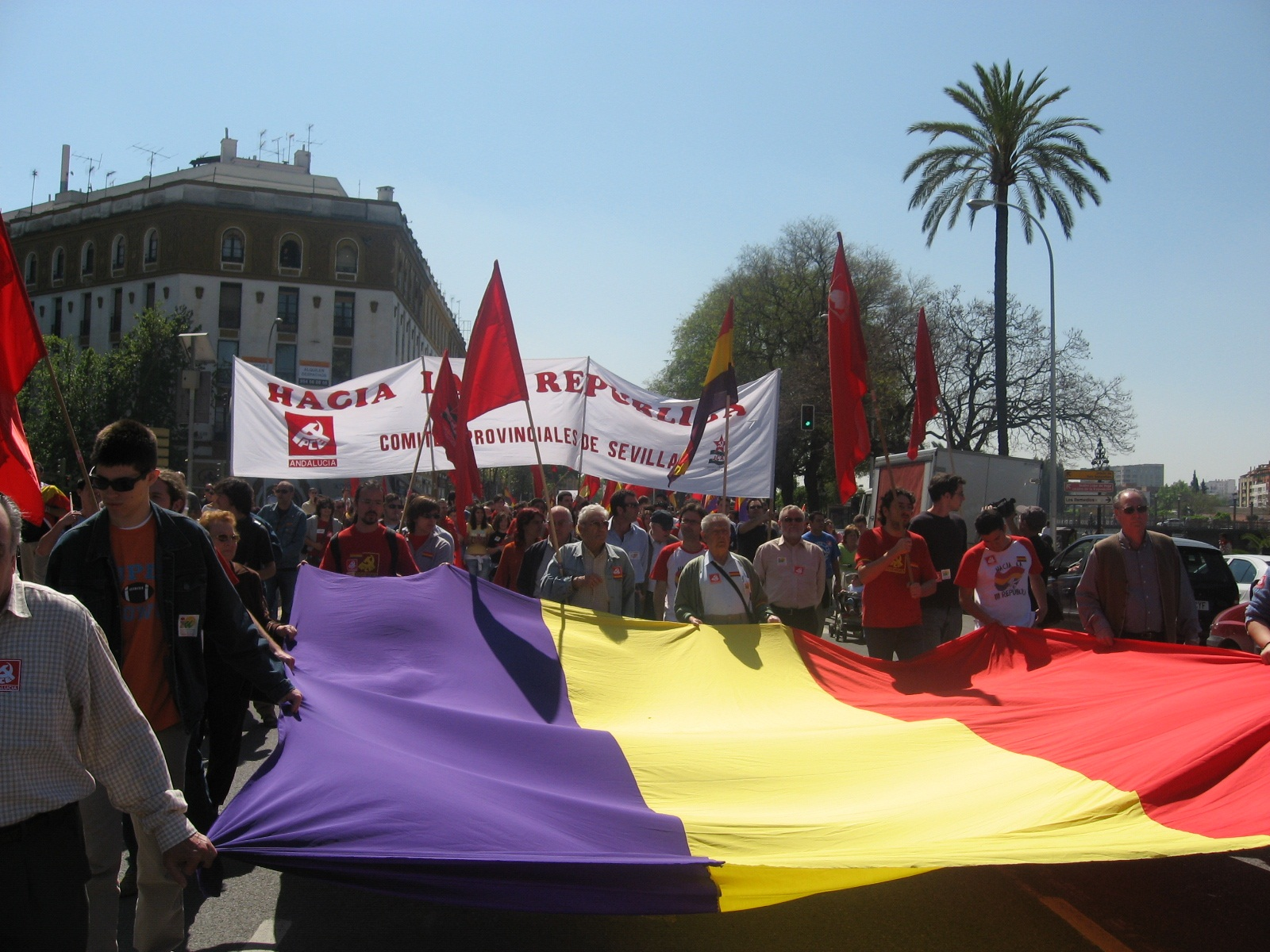
Pro-Republican demonstration in Seville, April 2006

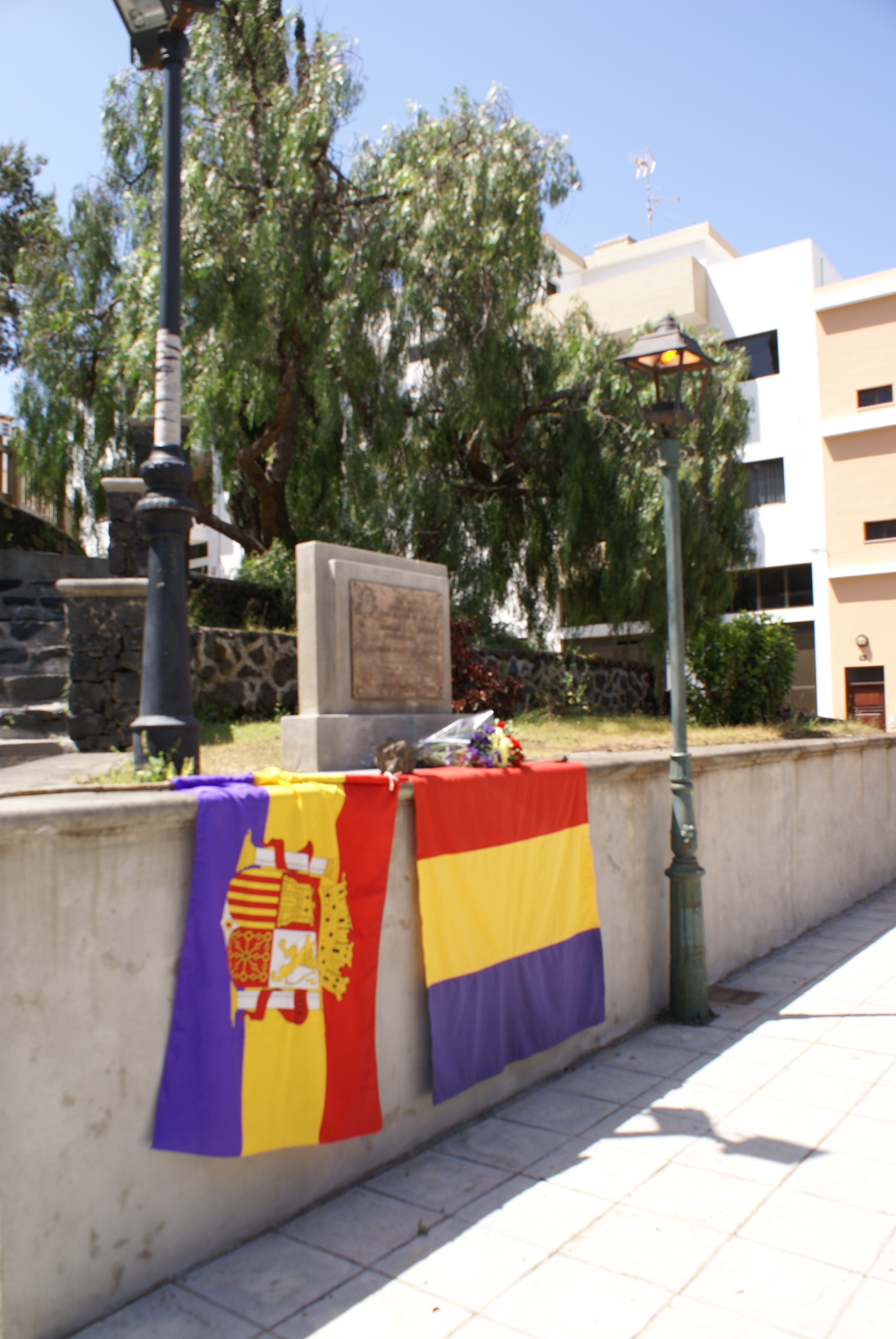
Monument to former Los Llanos de Aridane Republican major Francisco Rodríguez Betancourt. The flag on the left with its oversized coat of arms is a recent commercial version.

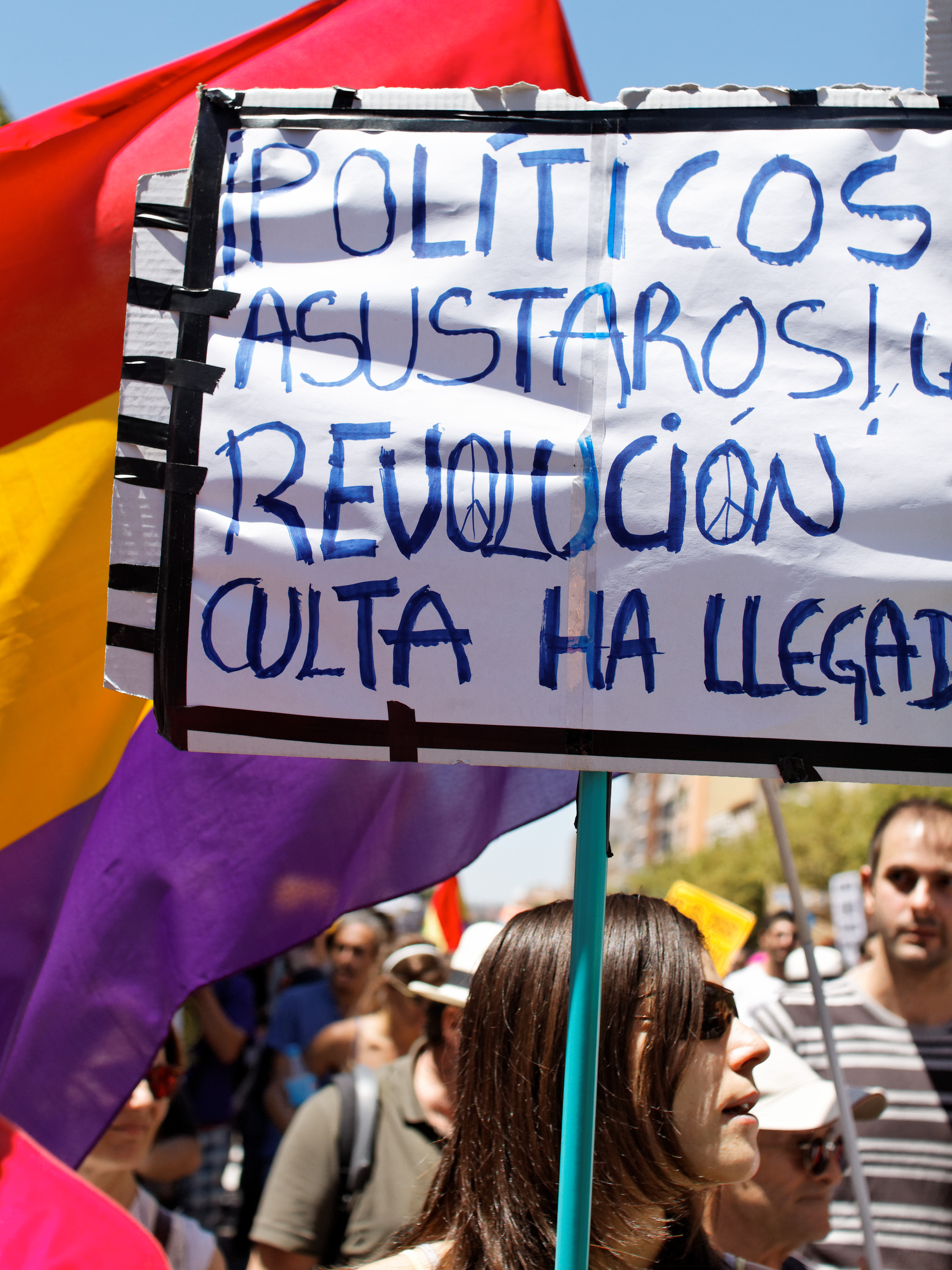
Madrid 19 June 2011 demonstration

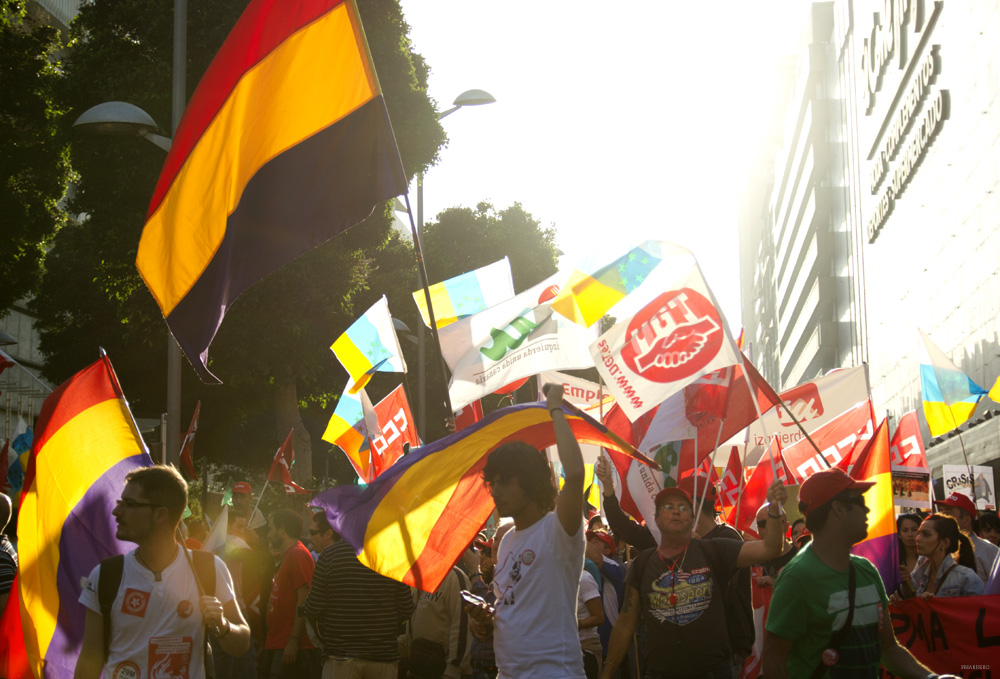
2012 demonstration in Las Palmas

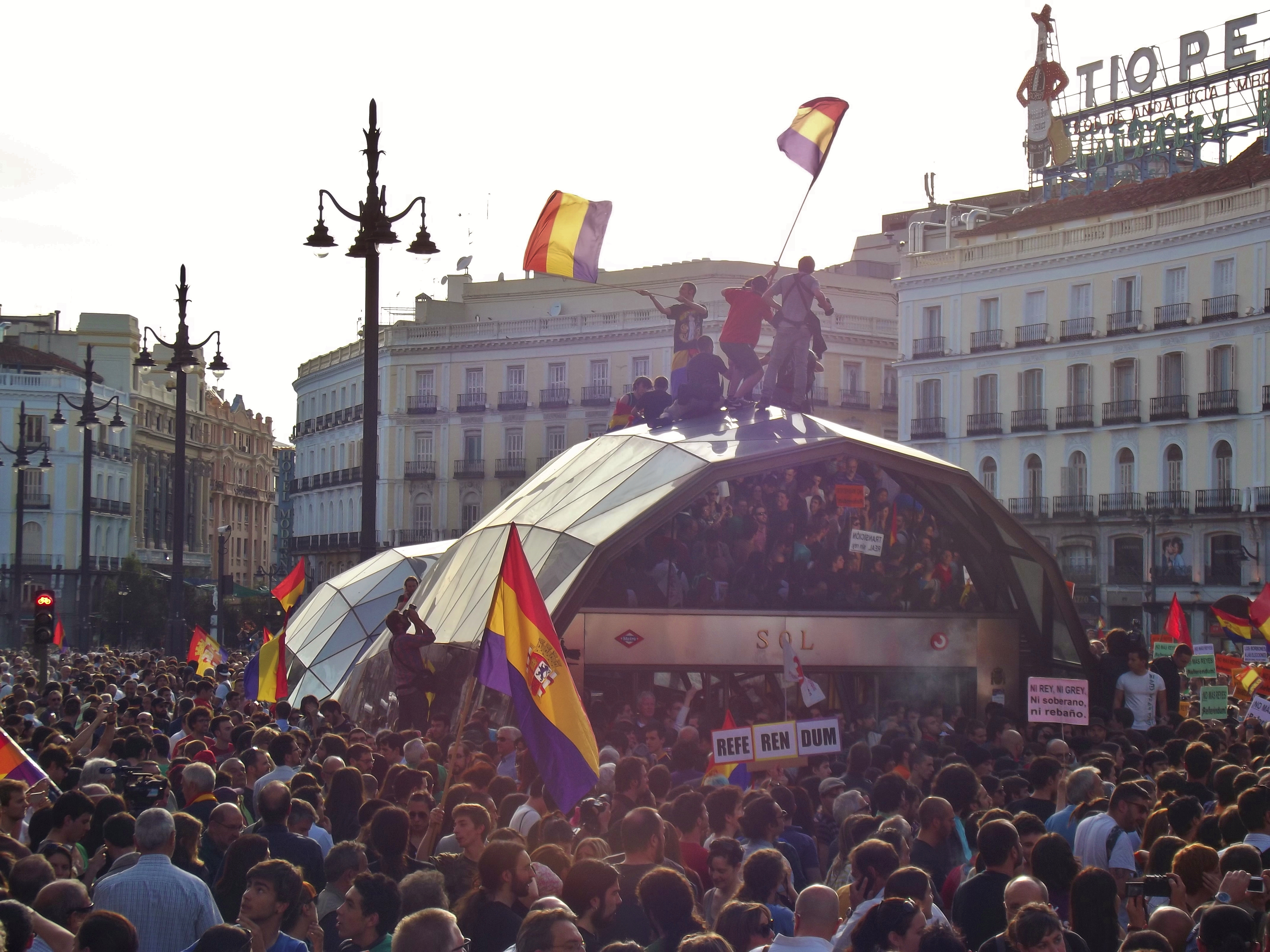
Republican demonstration in the Puerta del Sol on the day that Juan Carlos I announced his decision to abdicate

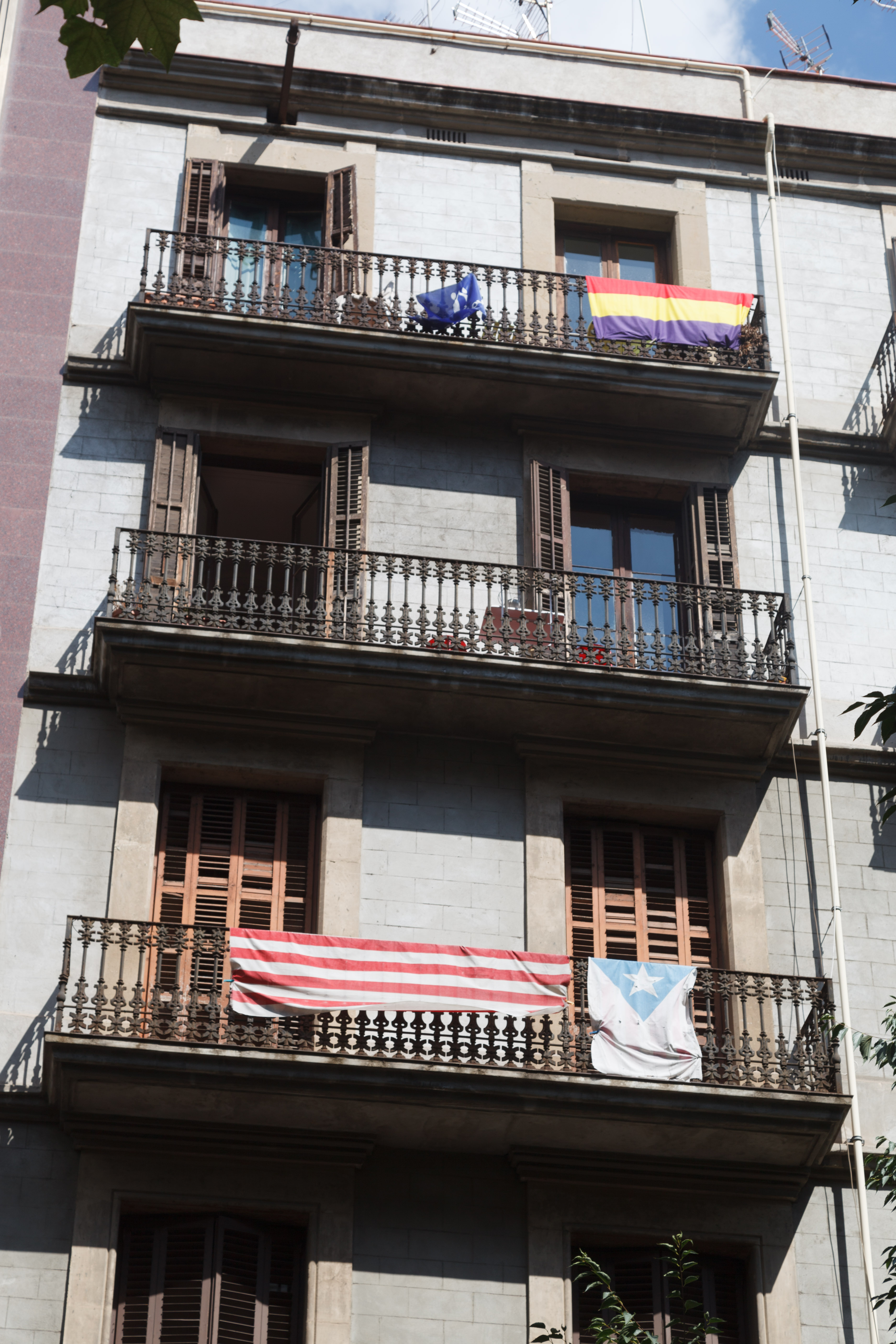
Use as a symbol in Barcelona during the campaign for the 2017 Catalan independence referendum

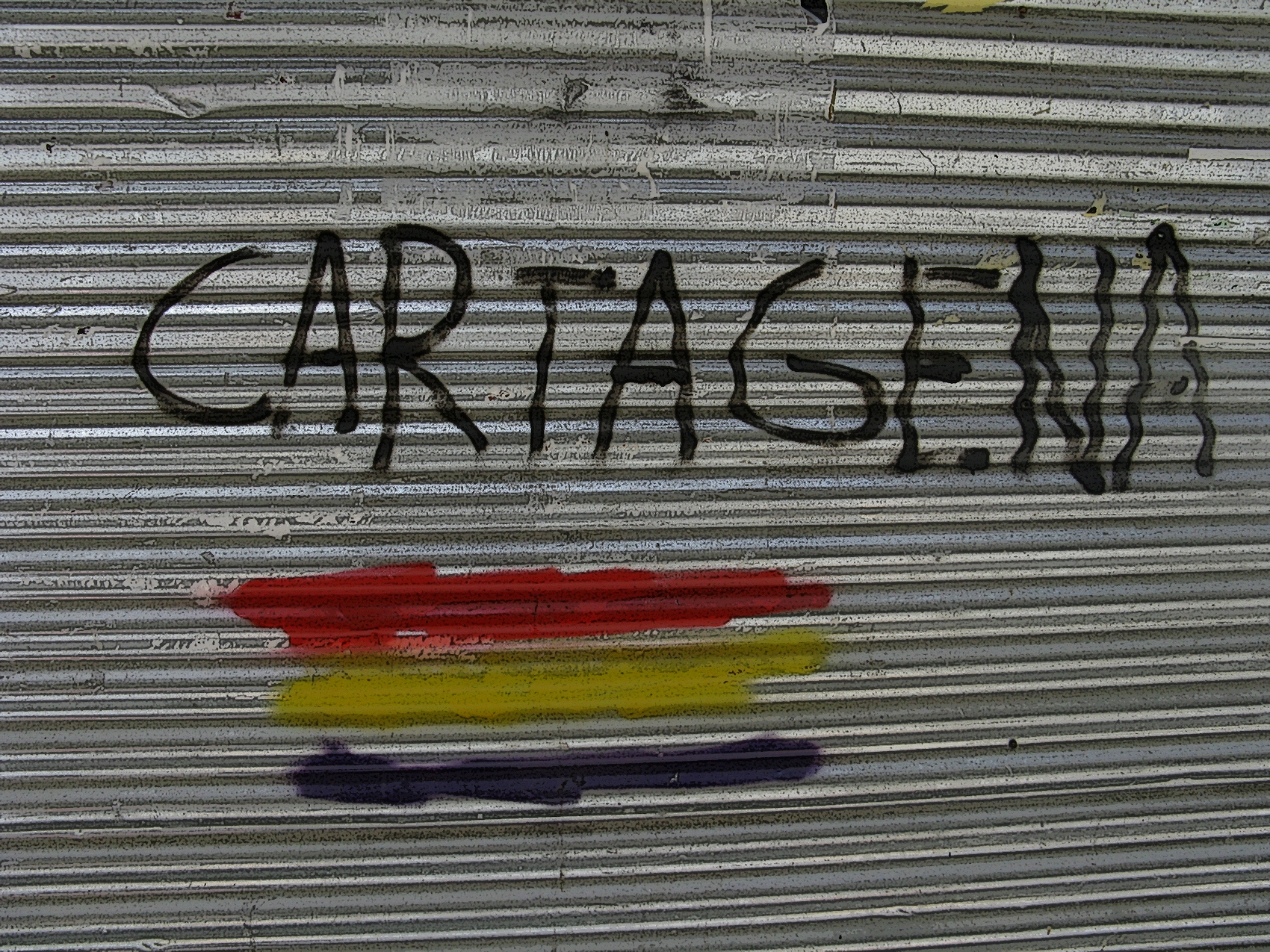
Spray-painted on a garage door in Cartagena

== See also ==
- Flag of Spain
- Coat of arms of the Second Spanish Republic
- Second Spanish Republic
- Himno de Riego
- Madrid Distinction

=== Other opposition flags ===
- White-red-white flag, former flag of Belarus and Belarusian opposition symbol
- White-blue-white flag, Russian anti-war and opposition symbol
- Flag of South Vietnam, often used by Vietnamese diaspora
- Flag of the Republic of Venezuela (1954–2006), used by the Venezuelan opposition and diaspora
- Lion and Sun flag, former flag of Iran and Iranian opposition symbol
