= Coat of arms of the Second Spanish Republic =

Arms of the Spanish Republic
- Armiger: Second Spanish Republic
- Adopted: 1931
- Crest: Mural crown
- Shield: Quarterly of Castile, Leon, Aragon and Navarre enté en point of Granada.
- Supporters: Two Pillars of Hercules
- Motto: PLVS VLTRA

National flag of the Second Spanish Republic

The Coat of arms of the Second Spanish Republic was the emblem of the Second Spanish Republic, the government that existed in Spain between April 14, 1931, when King Alfonso XIII left the country, and April 1, 1939, when the last of the Republican forces surrendered to Francoist forces at the end of the Spanish Civil War.

The national flag of the Second Spanish Republic would have the coat of arms in the middle of the central yellow band. There was no coat of arms in the Spanish Republican Civil Ensign.

== History ==
=== Origin ===
Following the 1868 Revolution that put an end to the unpopular reign of Isabella II the Provisional Government that was subsequently established decided to modify the Spanish symbols, doing away with the monarchic elements of the Bourbon Dynasty that had been up till then part of them. After reviewing a few proposals, one of which included a green civic crown, the following coat of arms was adopted: quarterly of Castile, Leon, Aragon and Navarre enté en point of Granada. The crown was a mural crown instead of the royal crown.

The First Spanish Republic that was instituted in 1873 adopted the coat of arms of the 1868–1871 Provisional Government without changes. The mural crown topped coat of arms was one of the main official symbols of Spain until the 1874 coup d'état by General Arsenio Martínez-Campos initiated the Bourbon Restoration, putting an end to the period known as Democratic Sexennium (Sexenio Democrático).

=== 1931 ===
The Spanish Republic reestablished in 1931 revived the coat of arms of the short-lived First Spanish Republic (1873–1874) which had originated in turn in the revision of Spanish symbols that followed the Revolution of 1868. The only exception was that the lion of the second quarter was depicted uncrowned.

The coat of arms of the Second Spanish Republic was flanked by the two Pillars of Hercules bearing scrolls with the motto Plus Ultra (Latin for further beyond). The colour of the scrolls is usually white or pale golden, but there is a high proportion of official representations displaying the red colour.

== Gallery ==
Proposal of 1868 with a Civic Crown as crest, Provisional Government term, led by Francisco Serrano
(1868–1870)

Coat of arms displaying a crowned lion, used during the Provisional Government term and the First Republic
(1873–1874)

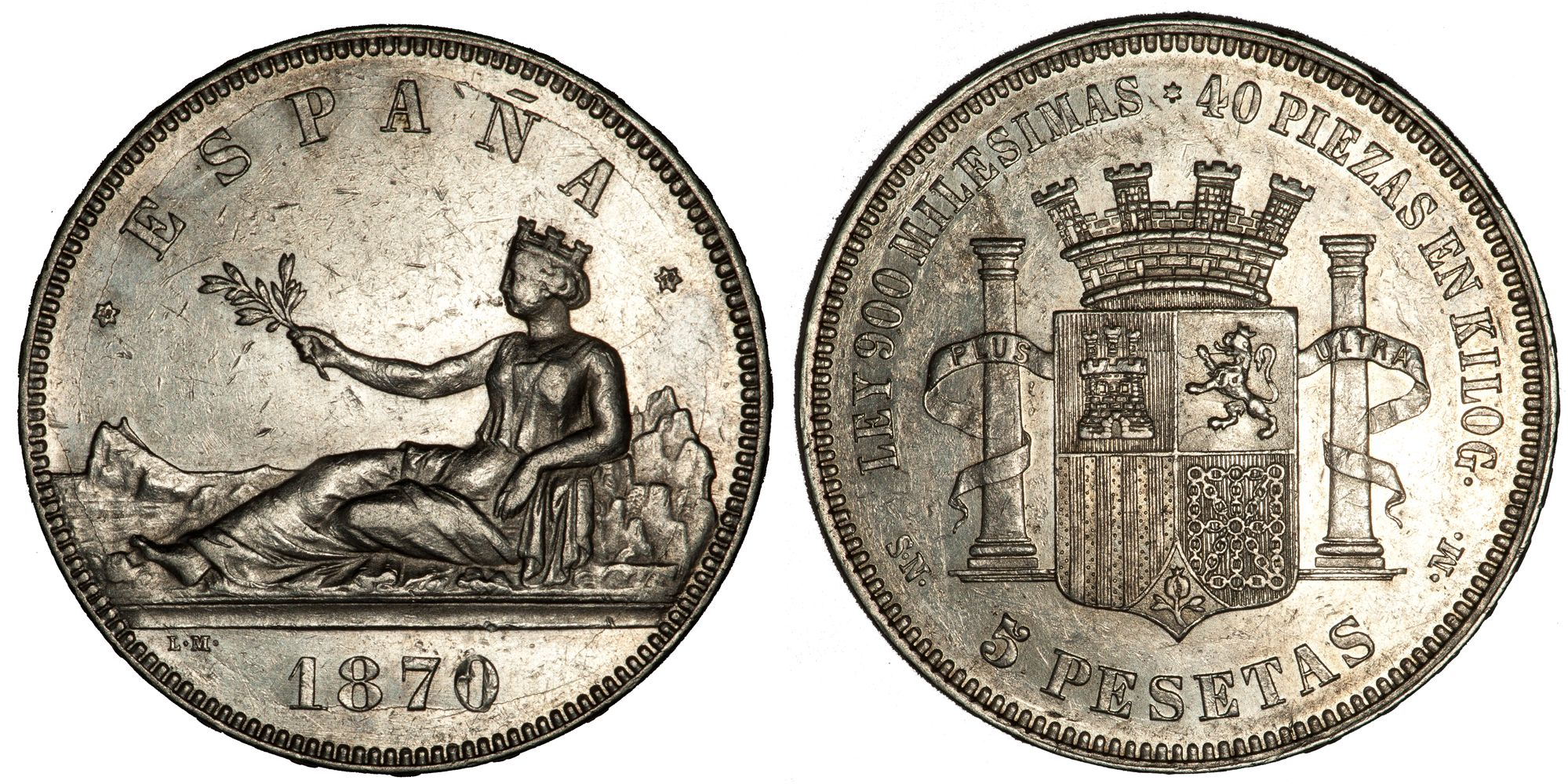
5 Peseta coin with the coat of arms first used by the Provisional Govt.

Variant with white pillars

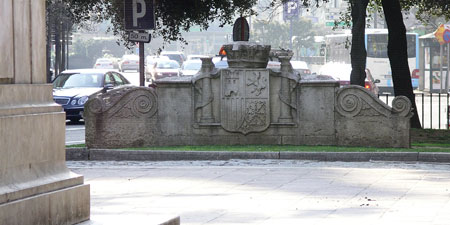
Republican Coat of arms carved in stone. Located at the Town Hall square in Santander, it had quietly survived General Franco's era until it was removed in December 2008

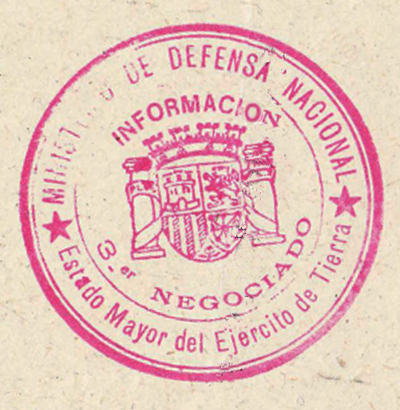
Seal of the 'National Defence Ministry' (Ministerio de la Defensa Nacional)

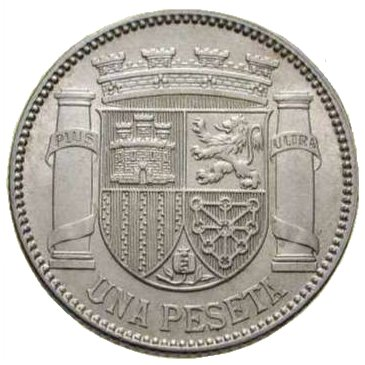
Coat of arms of the Spanish Republic on a 1935 Peseta coin

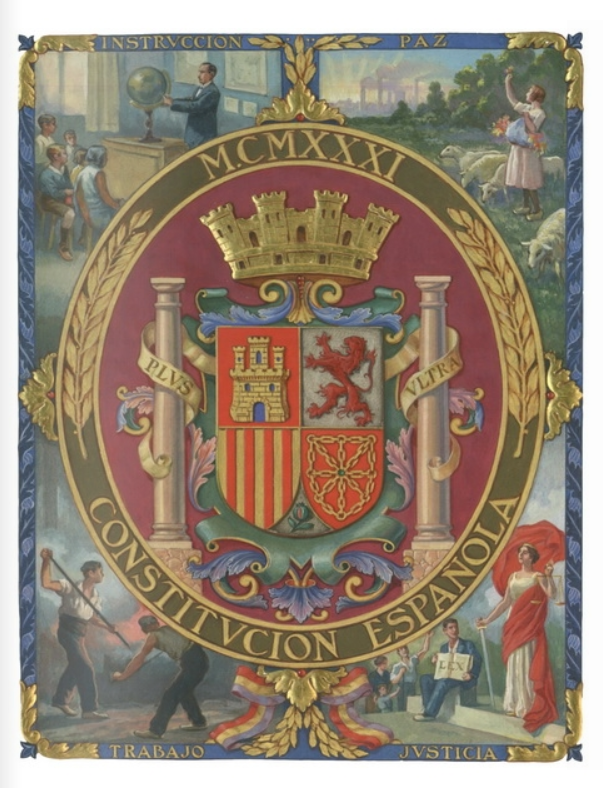
Cover of the 1931 Constitution of the Spanish Republic with cream coloured scrolls

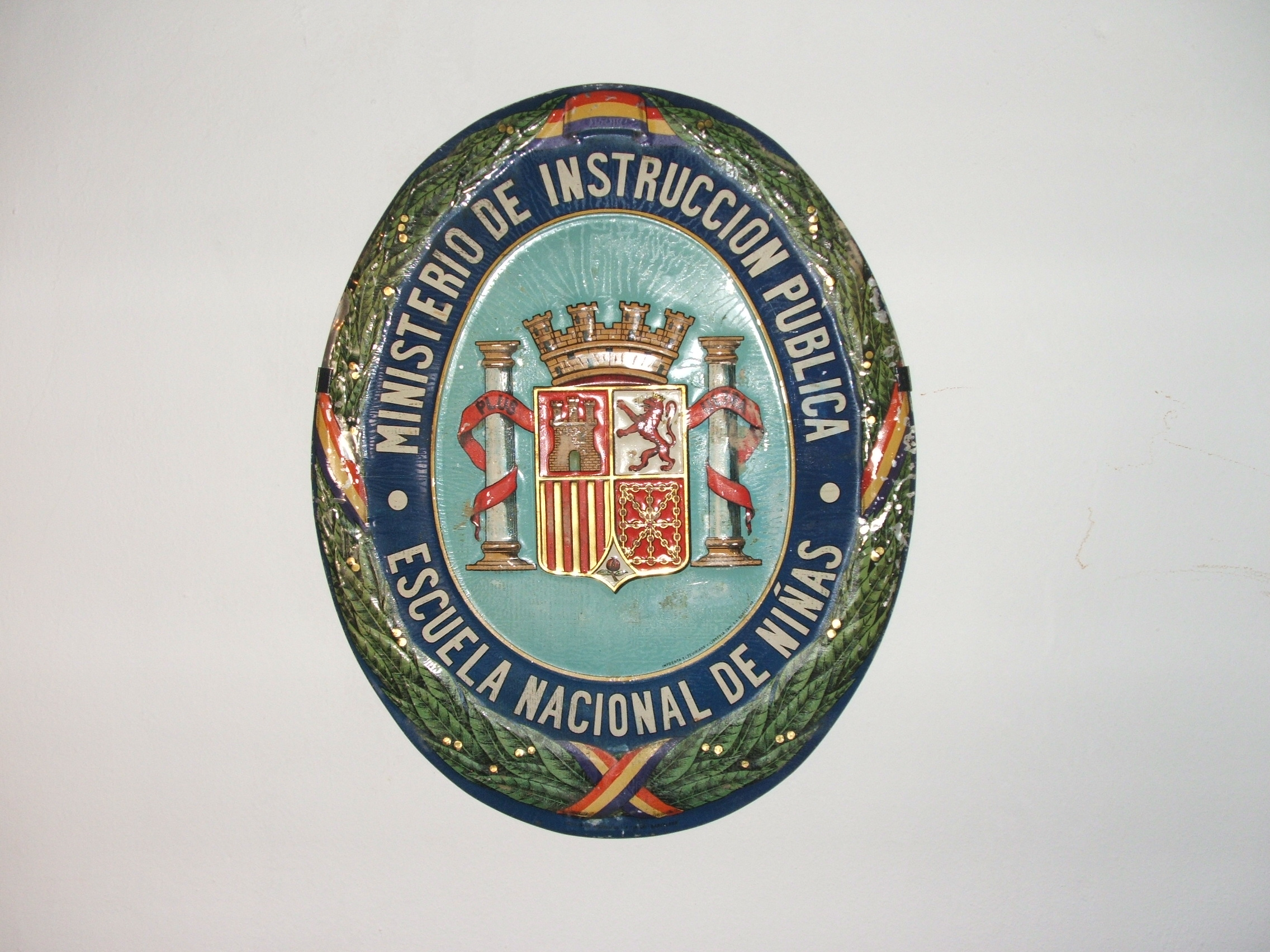
Enameled metal plate of a National Girls' School with red coloured scrolls

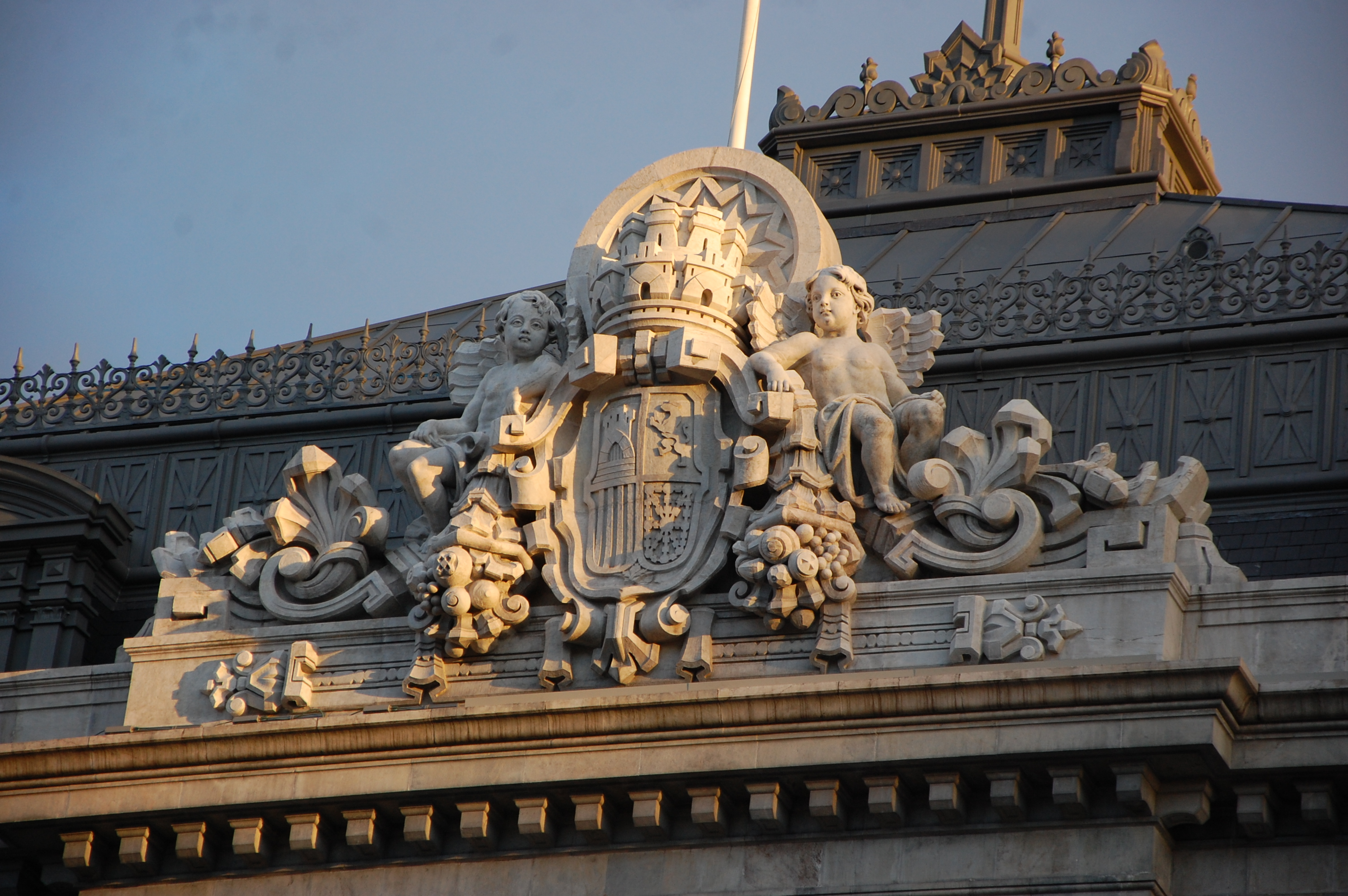
Spanish Republican Coat of arms on the Bank of Spain facade in Madrid

== See also ==
- Coat of arms of Spain
- List of coats of arms of Spain
- Flag of the Second Spanish Republic
- Spanish heraldry
