= Coat of arms of Lleida =

Coat of Arms of Lleida.

The Coat of Arms of the city of Lleida has its origins in the 13th century and has the following heraldic description:

An escutcheon in lozenge. Or, four pallets of Gules. A charge of an Iris in vert with three stems in vert with a Fleur-de-lis in argent on each. Recently, the crest, a Grandee crown of Or and precious stones, with eight rosettes, five visible, and eight pearls interspersed, has been changed and it shows the mural crown which is commonly used in municipal coats of arms of cities in Catalonia.

== Province of Lleida version ==
Coat of Arms of the Province of Lleida.

In October 2002, another version was approved as the Province Coat of Arms.

It consists in an escutcheon in lozenge. Or, four pallets of Gules. An inescutcheon of vert with an Iris in sable with three stems in sable with a Fleur-de-lis in argent on each. A Bordure of Or charged with four roundels of gules. In crest, the Mural crown for provinces in Or
