= Walls of Santiago de Compostela =

Coordinates: 42°52′N 8°33′W

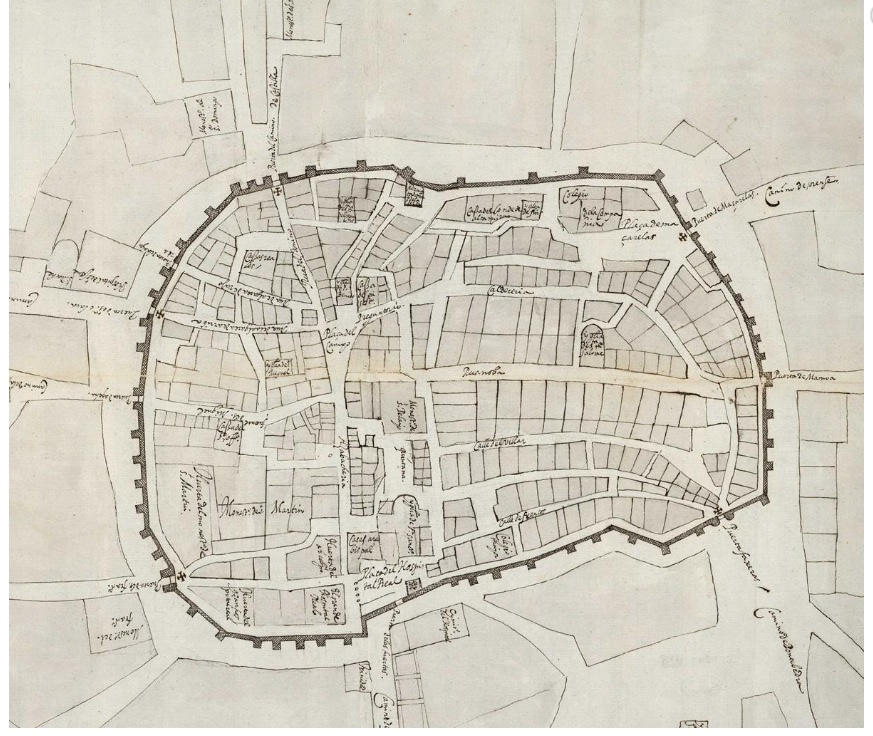
Map of Santiago de Compostela in 1595, with the wall highlighted

The Santiago de Compostela Wall was a medieval defensive wall in Santiago de Compostela, Galicia, Spain. It was mostly demolished towards the end of the 19th century, although some fragments remain today, the largest being the Mazarelos arch.

== History ==
In the year 968 Sisenando II walled the area around the church built before the current cathedral, forming the nucleus known as Locus Sancti Iacobi. This space is now occupied by the cathedral, the Quintana Square and the Monastery of Saint Pelagius of Antealtares, with a few adjacent streets. This wall, which was complemented by a second ring made up of moats and palisades, was almost completely destroyed by the Almanzor expedition in 997.

In the middle of the 11th century, given the rise of the city, which was beginning to be a flourishing place of pilgrimage, together with the fear of a Norman or Muslim incursion, bishop Cresconius built a new, much larger wall over the ring of moats and palisades. This new wall, which was about 2 km in circumference and covered a space of 30 hectares, is essentially the one that remained until the 19th century and protected the new suburbs that were forming around the cathedral.

Of the first wall, which disappeared very soon under the new buildings, there are only a few vestiges that have been found in the Azabachería area. In 2009, during the remodeling works of the old Bank of Spain building to accommodate the new Museum of Pilgrimage, a section of this first fortification was found in fairly good condition.
