= Holy Door (Santiago de Compostela) =

Ceremonial cathedral door in Galicia, Spain

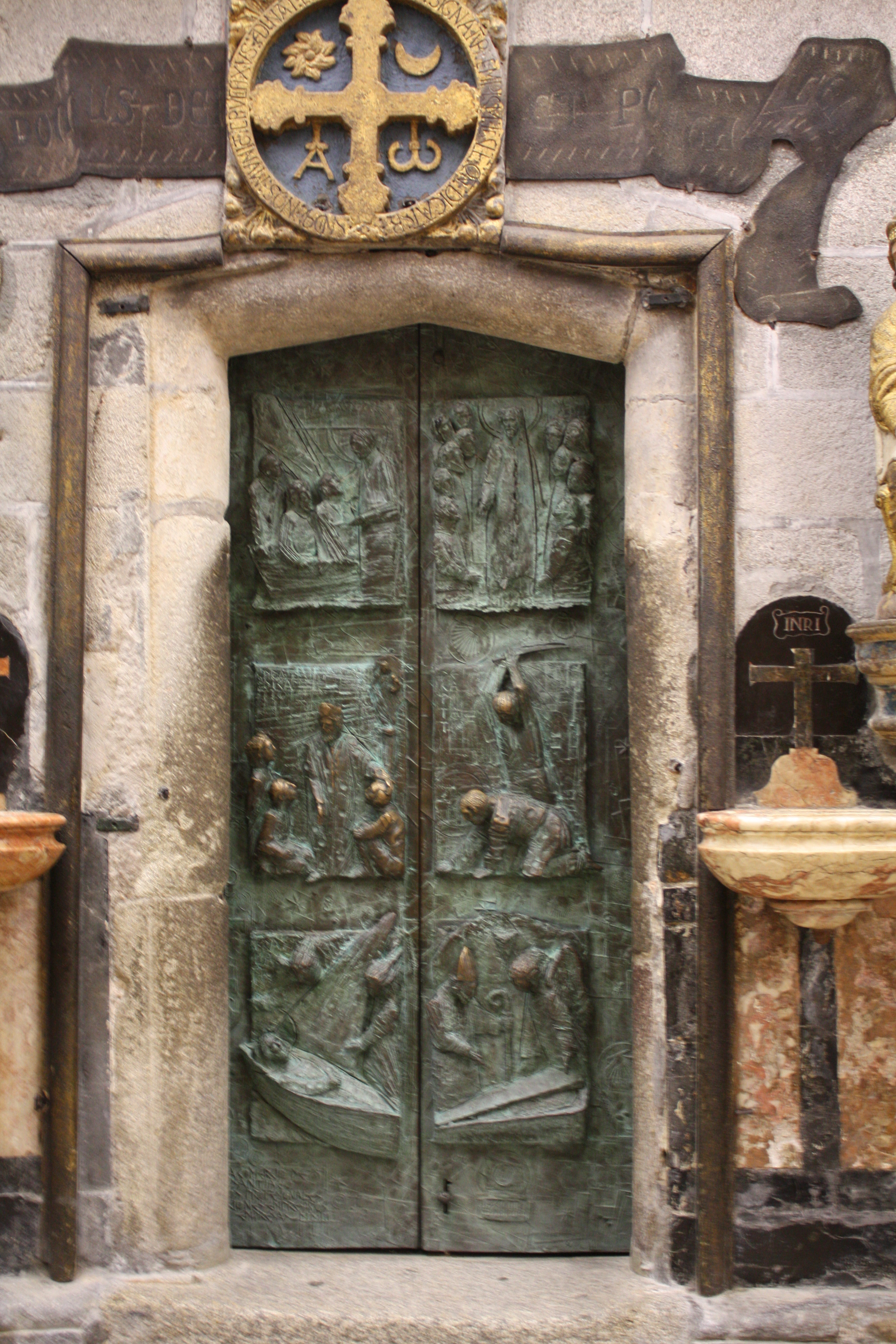
Holy Door of the Cathedral of Santiago de Compostela

The Holy Door (Spanish: Puerta Santa, Galician: Porta Santa), also known as the Door of Forgiveness (Galician: Porta do Perdón), is located at the rear of the Santiago de Compostela Archcathedral Basilica, in Galicia, Spain, and is opened only during a Jacobean Holy Year. During the Holy Year it remains open so that pilgrims, and others, may enter from the Plaza de la Quintana into the apse of the cathedral. Those who do so may earn a plenary indulgence.

== Background ==
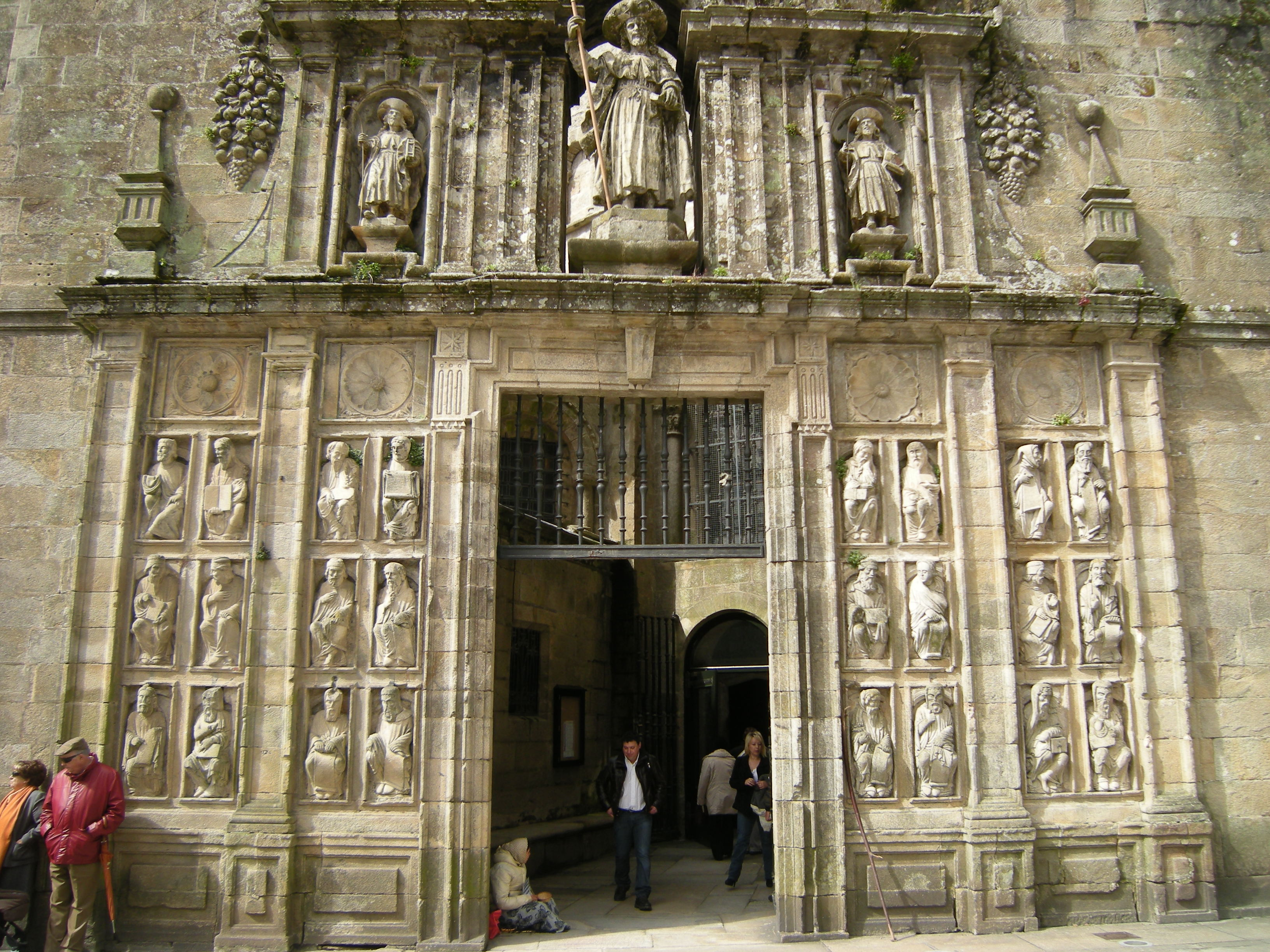
Exterior door facing the Plaza de la Quintana

Initially the door was known as the Porta de San Paio and was dedicated to St. Pelagius, for whom the monastery across the plaza is named.

Aymeric Picaud described the cathedral in Book V of the Codex Calixtinus as having three main porticoes and seven small ones:

Of the seven small porticoes, the first is called Santa Maria [...] the third, from San Paio [...]

The east façade of the cathedral that overlooks the Plaza de la Quintana has two gates: the Porta Real (royal gate) and the Porta Santa (holy gate). The baroque construction of the Porta Real was begun under the direction of José de Vega y Verdugo and by José de la Peña de Toro in 1666. It was completed in 1700 by Domingo de Andrade, who built some of the columns that span two floors of windows, a balustrade with large pinnacles, and an aedicula with an equestrian statue of Saint James (now gone), well adorned with decorative fruit clusters and large-scale military trophies. The kings of Spain entered the cathedral through this door, hence its name and the royal coat of arms on its lintel.

The Porta Santa or Holy Door is also known as the Door of Forgiveness (Galician: Porta do Perdón). During a Jacobean Holy Year (years when Saint James' Day, 25 July, falls on a Sunday), pilgrims who enter the basilica through the door earn a plenary indulgence granted by Pope Alexander III in his 1179 bull, Regis aeterni. The door is usually closed with a fence and opened only during the holy year.

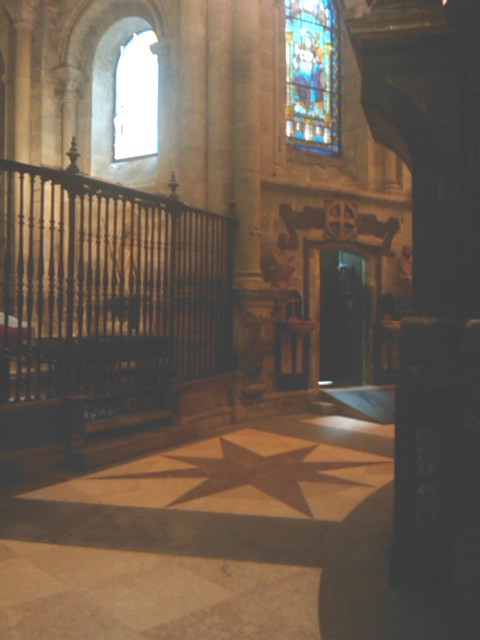
A star on the floor of the ambulatory marks an earlier location of the door.

The door may not be in its original place, nor is it the original door. Its location may have been moved as the church was rebuilt to accommodate the Chapel of the Savior. It is no longer directly accessible from the outside, as an expansion of the cathedral added a room between the apse and the external door to the plaza. The only marker of the original exit is an eight-pointed star on the floor to indicate its location.

Niches above the exterior door to the courtyard contain sculptures of James and his disciples Athanasius and Theodore. At the sides of the door are twenty-four sculpted figures of prophets and apostles (including St. James) some of which had originally been part of the cathedral's stone choir built in the workshop of sculptor Master Mateo. Inside this door, through a small courtyard, is the true Holy Door.

The Holy Door opens into the ambulatory of the apse, between the Chapel of the Azucena or Saint Peter (Galician: Capilla de la Azucena o de San Pedro) and the Chapel of the Savior, where the construction of the cathedral began in 1075. There is a belief that the door was designated as the door for pilgrims because of its placement near the ambulatory. The route the ambulatory makes around the altar, and the descent to the tomb of the Apostle James, mark the end of the pilgrimage. The exit from the tomb represents redemption and a new life, similar to that described in Plato's allegory of the cave.

== Gallery ==
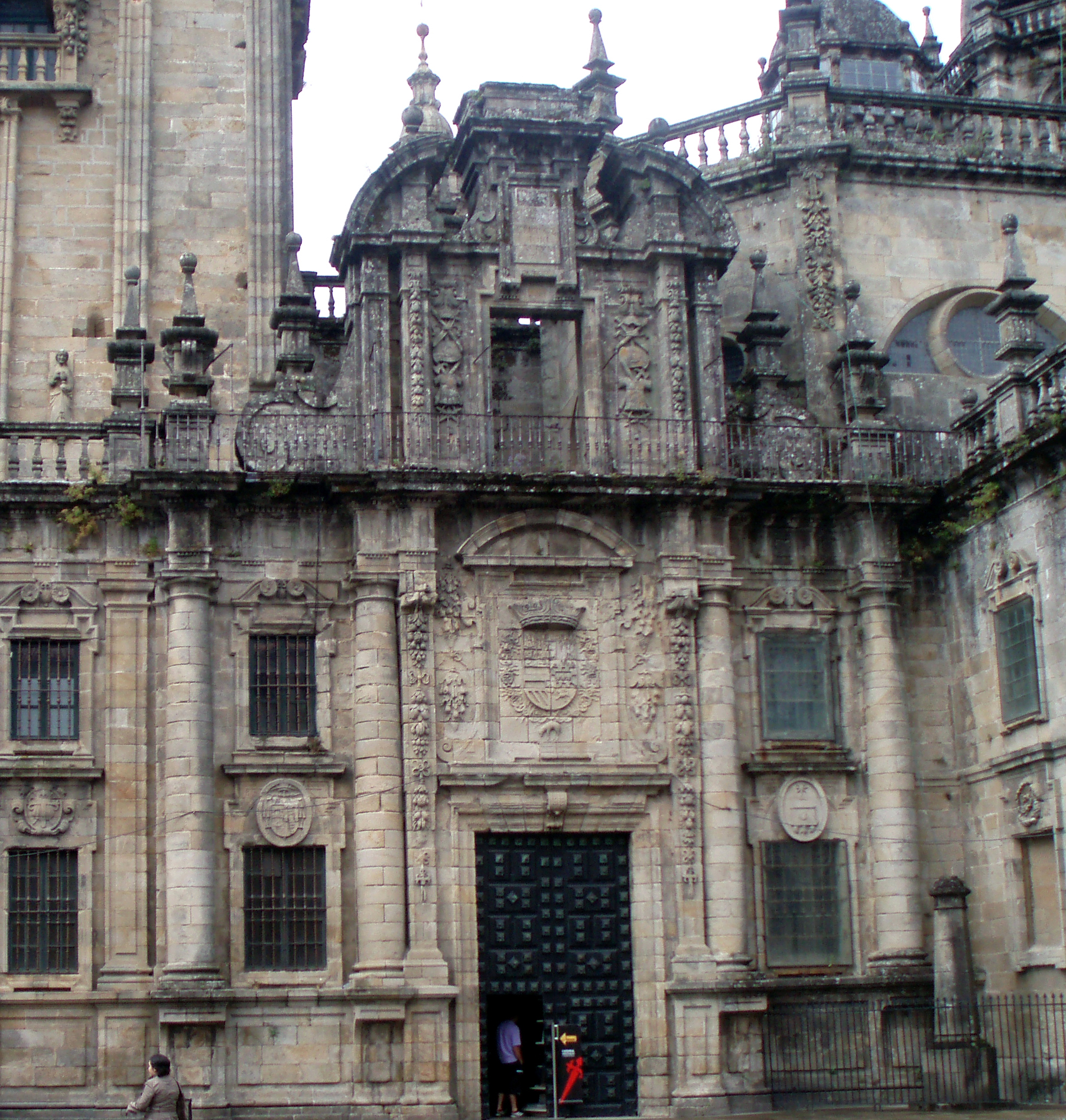
Porta Real

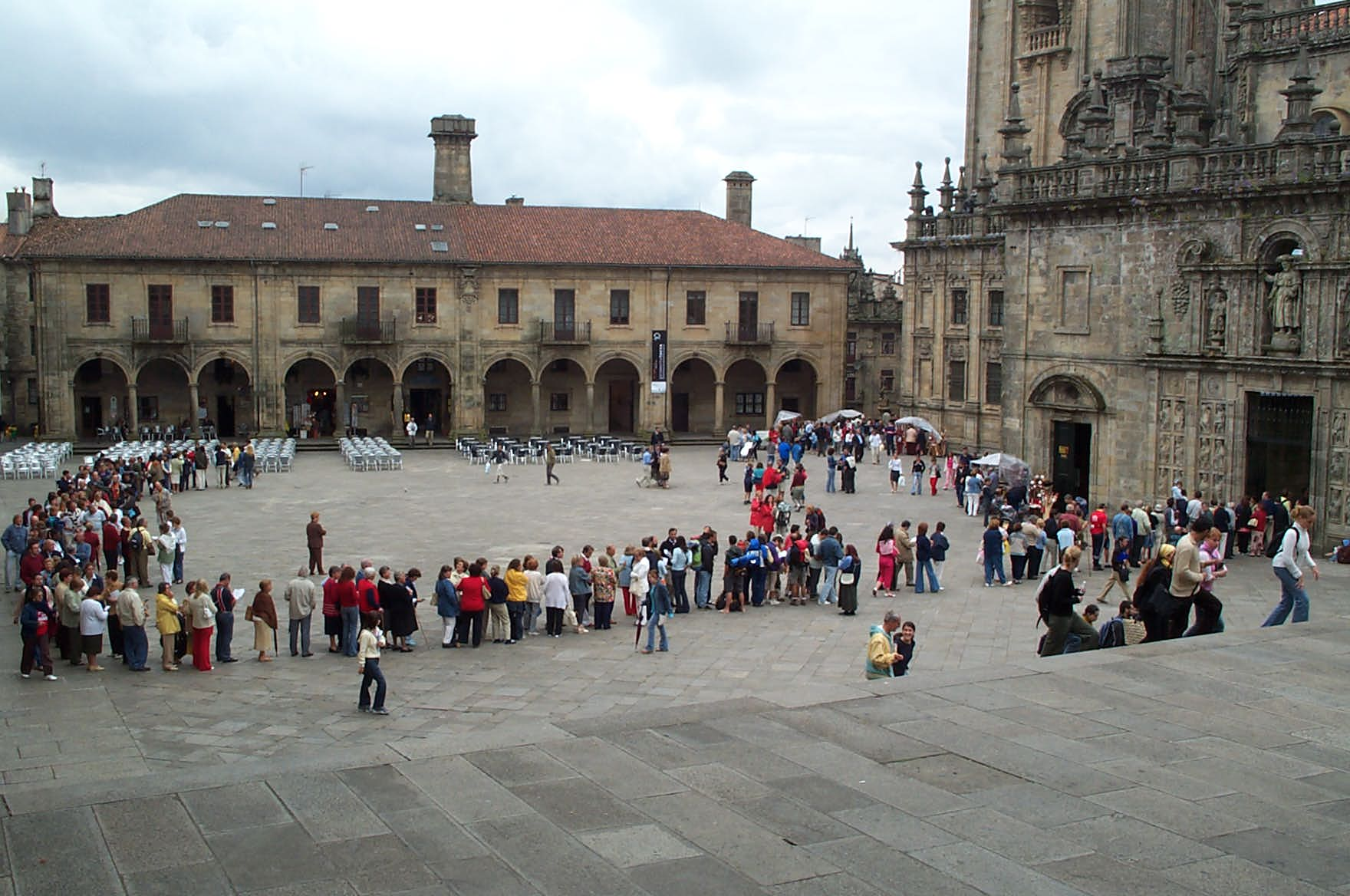
A line of people waiting to enter the exterior door
- Stone choir of Master Mateo
- Holy door

== Bibliography ==
- Hani, Jean (2016). José J. Olañeta (ed.). El simbolismo del templo cristiano (in Spanish). Quingles, Jordi (Translator) (1 ed.). José J. de Olañeta. ISBN 978-8476514481.
- López Pereira, X. Eduardo [in Galician] (1993). Guía medieval do peregrino. Códice Calixtino, libro V (in Spanish). Vigo. ISBN 9788475077239.
- Navascués Palacio, Pedro; Sarthou Carreres, Carlos (1997). Catedrales de España. Madrid: Espasa Calpe. ISBN 84-239-7645-9. OCLC 249825366. "Edición especial para el Banco Bilbao Vizcaya"
- Otero Pedrayo, Ramón (1965). Guía de Galicia (in Spanish) (4 ed.). Galaxia.
- Otero Túñez, Ramón [in Galician]; Yzquierdo Perrín, Ramón [in Galician] (1990). El coro del maestro Mateo. Fundación Pedro Barrié de la Maza. ISBN 9788485728947.
