= Saint James' Day =

Saint James' Day may be:

- Feast of Saint James
- St. James' Day Battle
