= Berenguela Tower =

Bell tower in Santiago de Compostela, Spain

- Torre da Berengela
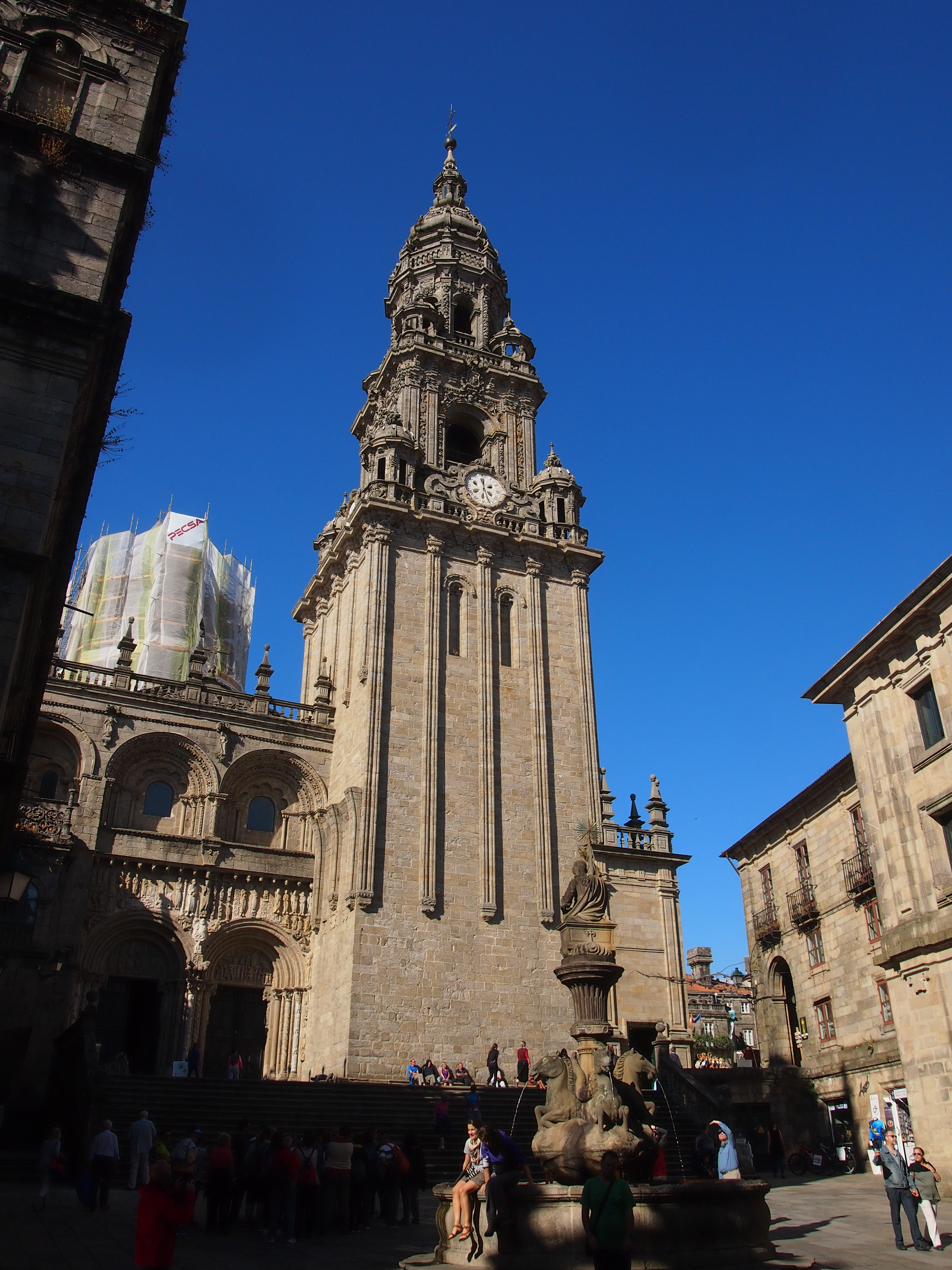
- The tower seen from Praterías square
- Interactive map of the Berenguela Tower area
- Alternative names: Tower of the Clock; Tower of the Trinity

General information
- Type: Defensive tower, later converted into a clock tower
- Architectural style: Romanesque (lower section); Baroque (upper section)
- Location: Santiago de Compostela Cathedral, Santiago de Compostela, Spain
- Coordinates: 42°52′49″N 08°32′39″W
- Construction started: 14th century

Height
- Height: 75 m (246 ft)

Design and construction
- Main contractor: Domingo de Andrade

The Berenguela Tower (Galician: Torre da Berenguela), also known as Tower of the Clock (Torre do Reloxo) or Tower of the Trinity (Torre da Trinidade), is the bell tower of the Santiago de Compostela Cathedral in Galicia, Spain. Tradition states that it was built by Archbishop Rodrigo del Padrón as a defense tower with the work continuing after his death by his successor, Archbishop Bérenger de Landore, after whom the tower is named. Reflecting its original purpose, much of the tower is made of ashlar stone. The tower sits on the southeast side of the cathedral where the Praterias Square and Quintana Square meet. The tower is visible throughout the city.

== Background ==
The upper portion of the 75-metre (246 ft) tower has a pyramid-shaped crown, surrounded by four permanently lit bulbs and topped with a lantern finial. Construction of the tower began circa 1316 at the direction of Archbishop Rodrigo del Padrón as a defense tower. After Padrón's death the work was continued by his successor, Bérenger de Landore. The tower is named after de Landore. In the 15th century several modifications were made and in 1483 Louis XI of France donated the two largest of the thirteen bells.

In 1833, Archbishop Rafael de Vélez commissioned Andrés Antelo to install clocks on each side of the tower. The clock mechanism has two bells, one, sounding the full hour, called Berenguela, and a smaller one marking the quarter hours. The bells were cast in 1729 by Güemes Sampedro. Berenguela has a diameter of 255 cm (100 in) and a height of 215 cm (85 in), weighing approximately 9,600 kg (21,200 lb), while the smaller one weighs in at 1,839 kg (4,054 lb), with a diameter of 147 cm (58 in) and a height of 150 cm (59 in). Both original bells cracked and were replaced by replicas, cast in Asten, Netherlands by the Eijsbouts foundry in 1989, and installed in the cathedral in February 1990.

During a Jacobean Holy Year, Berenguela's lantern is lit throughout the year. otherwise it stays unlit. The light acts as a lighthouse to guide pilgrims to the cathedral during the holy years.

== Bibliography ==
- Navascués Palacio, Pedro; Sarthou Carreres, Carlos (1997). Catedrales de España (in Spanish). Edición especial para el Banco Bilbao Vizcaya. Madrid: Espasa Calpe. ISBN 84-239-7645-9. OCLC 249825366.
