= Thurible =

Metal vessel on chains for burning incense

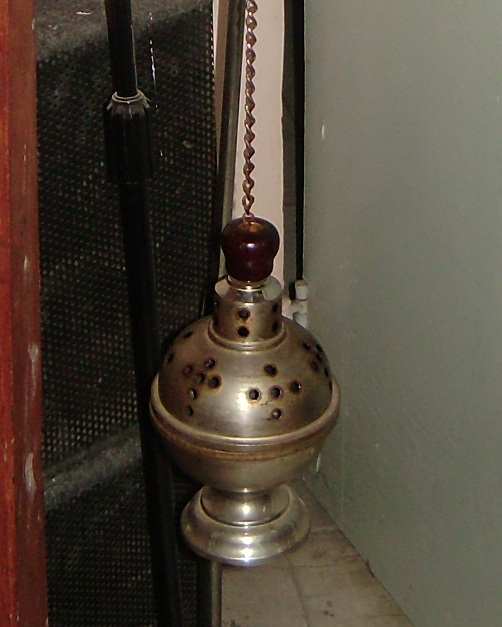
A single chain thurible, as used by some Western churches

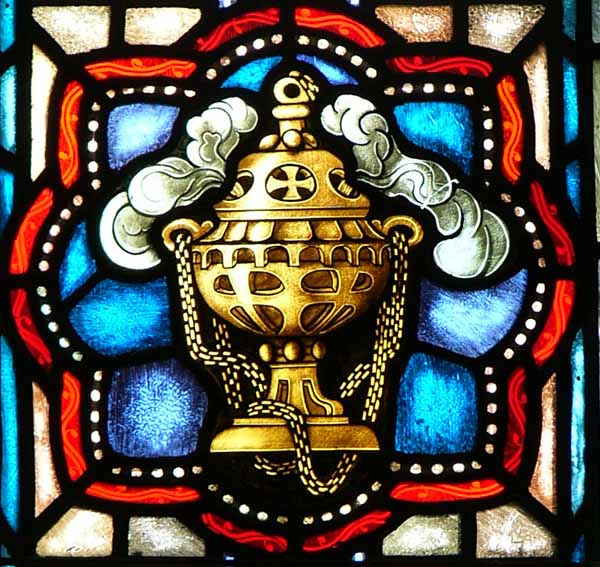
Stained glass window depiction of a thurible, St. Ignatius Church, Chestnut Hill, Massachusetts

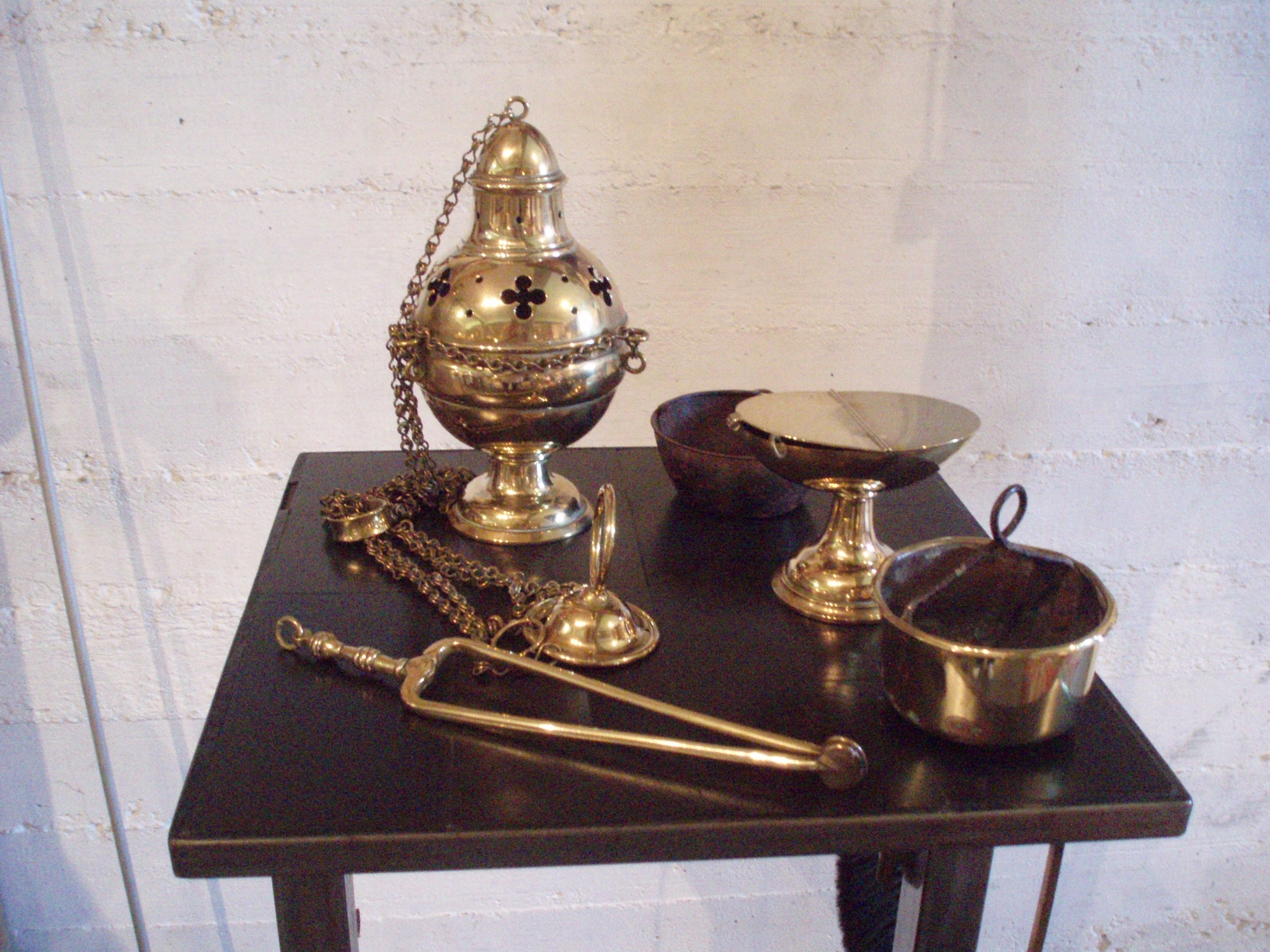
Clockwise from upper left: Thurible, cup from inside thurible, incense boat, charcoal holder, and tongs

A thurible (via Old French from Medieval Latin turibulum) is a metal incense burner suspended from chains, in which incense is burned during worship services. It is used in Christian churches, including those of the Roman Catholic, Eastern Orthodox, Assyrian Church of the East, Oriental Orthodox, Lutheran and Old Catholic denominations, as well as in some Continental Reformed, Presbyterian, Methodist and Anglican churches (with its use almost universal amongst Anglican churches of Anglo Catholic churchmanship). The acolyte or altar server who carries the thurible is called the thurifer. The practice is rooted in the earlier traditions of Judaism dating from the time of the Second Jewish Temple, and is still ceremoniously utilized in some Renewal communities.

In Christianity, the use of incense is symbolic of "cleansing and purification", as well as its fragrance suggesting "Christ’s robe of righteousness" that covers the sin of humankind.

Beyond its ecclesiastical and synagogal use, the thurible is also employed in various other spiritual or ceremonial traditions, including some Gnostic Churches, Freemasonry (especially in the consecration of new lodges), and in Co-Freemasonry. Thuribles are sometimes employed in the practice of ceremonial magic.

The workings of a thurible are quite simple. Each thurible consists of a censer section, chains (typically three or four, although single-chain thuribles also exist), a metal ring around the chains (used to lock the lid of the censer section in place), and usually (although not always) a removable metal crucible in which the burning charcoals are placed. Many thuribles are supplied with a stand, allowing the thurible to be hung safely when still hot, but not in use. Burning charcoal is placed inside the metal censer, either directly into the bowl section, or into a removable crucible if supplied, and incense (of which there are many different varieties) is placed upon the charcoal, where it melts to produce a sweet smelling smoke. This may be done several times during the service as the incense burns quite quickly. Once the incense has been placed on the charcoal the thurible is then closed and used for censing.

A famous thurible is the huge Botafumeiro in Santiago de Compostela Cathedral, Spain.

== Etymology ==
The word thurible comes from the Old French thurible, which in turn is derived from the Latin term thuribulum. The Latin thuribulum is further formed from the root thus, meaning 'incense'. Thus is an alteration of the Ancient Greek word θύος (thuos), which is derived from θύειν (thuein) "to sacrifice".

== Use in the Bible and Early Christianity ==
The use of incense in Christianity is inspired by passages in the Bible; its use in prayer and worship carries with it a Christian symbolism:

Incense is mentioned frequently in the Hebrew Scriptures. The psalmist expresses the symbolism of incense and prayer: "Let my prayer rise like incense before you; the lifting up of my hands as the evening sacrifice." (Psalm 141:1). In the Gospel, Zechariah is in the temple at the time of the incense offering (Luke 1) and the gifts the Magi offered to the Christ Child included gold, frankincense and myrrh. In Second Corinthians the knowledge of Christ is compared to a fragrant odor (2:14-16). The vision of heaven in Revelation includes the elders holding bowls of incense, described as the prayers of the saints (Revelation 5:8). The clouds of incense represent cleansing and purification, and the sweet smell suggests Christ's robe of righteousness that covers our sin. —"Why and how do we use incense in worship?", Evangelical Lutheran Church in America

Archaeological discoveries from early Christian churches have included metal censers and incense burners, providing material evidence that the use of incense formed part of Christian worship by Late Antiquity.

== Use by Christian denomination ==
=== Roman Rite ===
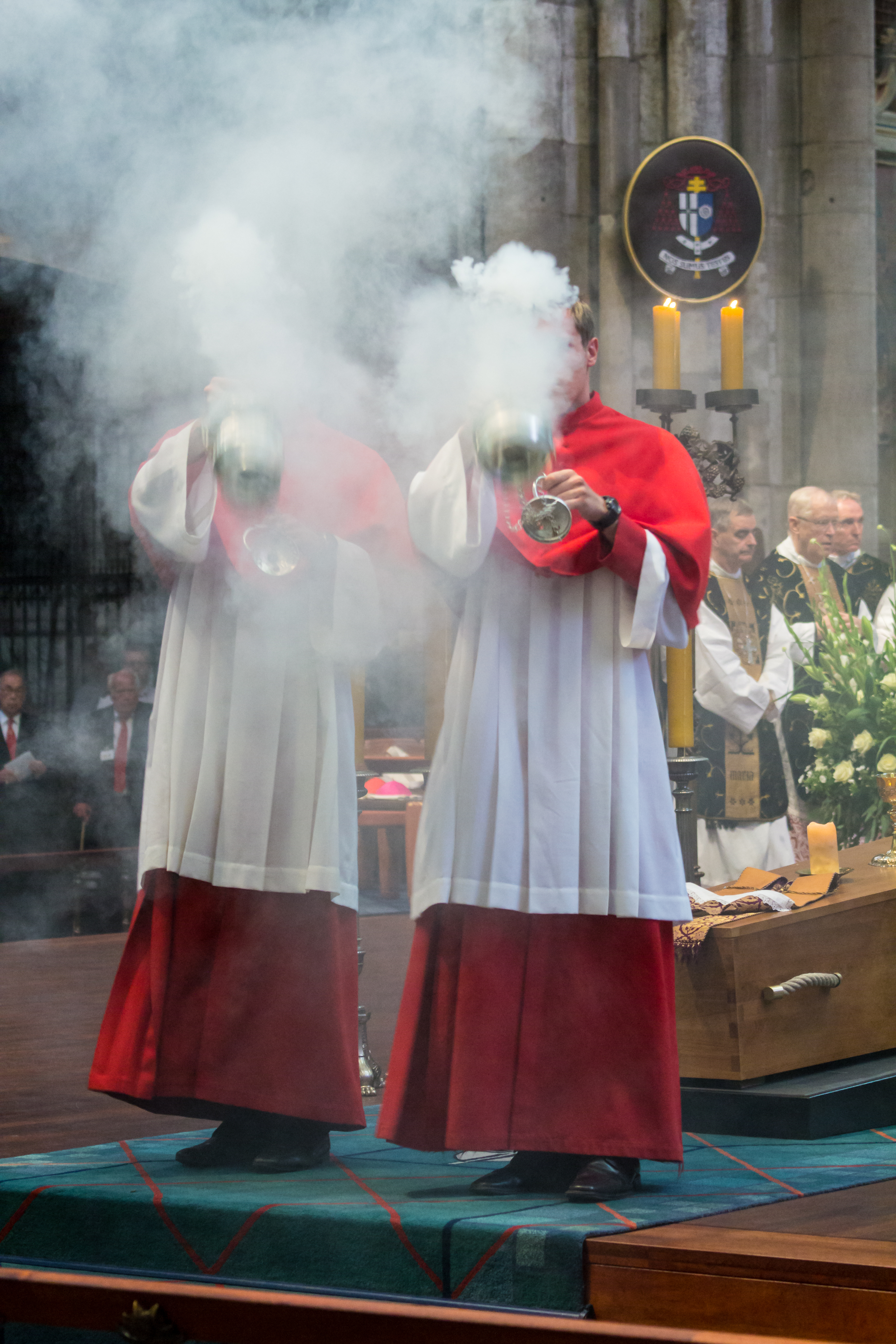
Two servers swing thuribles towards the congregation during a funeral.

The Roman Missal, as revised in 1969, allows the use of incense at any Mass: in the entrance procession; at the beginning of Mass to incense the cross and the altar; at the Gospel procession and proclamation; after the bread and the chalice have been placed upon the altar, to incense the offerings, the cross, and the altar, as well as the priest and the people; at the elevation of the host and the chalice after the consecration. In Benediction of the Blessed Sacrament and Eucharistic Adoration in the Roman Rite, incense is also used, and is required if the Blessed Sacrament is exposed in a monstrance rather than being in a ciborium. Incense is also burnt on the altar during its consecration by a bishop in the Roman Rite of the Catholic Church.

The number of swings of the thurible to be used when incensing persons or objects is specified in the General Instruction of the Roman Missal:

- Three double swings: the Most Blessed Sacrament, a relic of the Holy Cross and images of the Lord exposed for public veneration, the offerings for the sacrifice of the Mass, the altar cross, the Book of the Gospels, the Paschal Candle, the priest, and the people.
- Two double swings (and only at the beginning of the celebration, after the incensing of the altar): relics and images of the Saints exposed for public veneration.
- A series of single swings: the altar.
- The priest may incense the offerings for Mass by tracing a cross over them with the thurible instead of using three swings of the thurible.

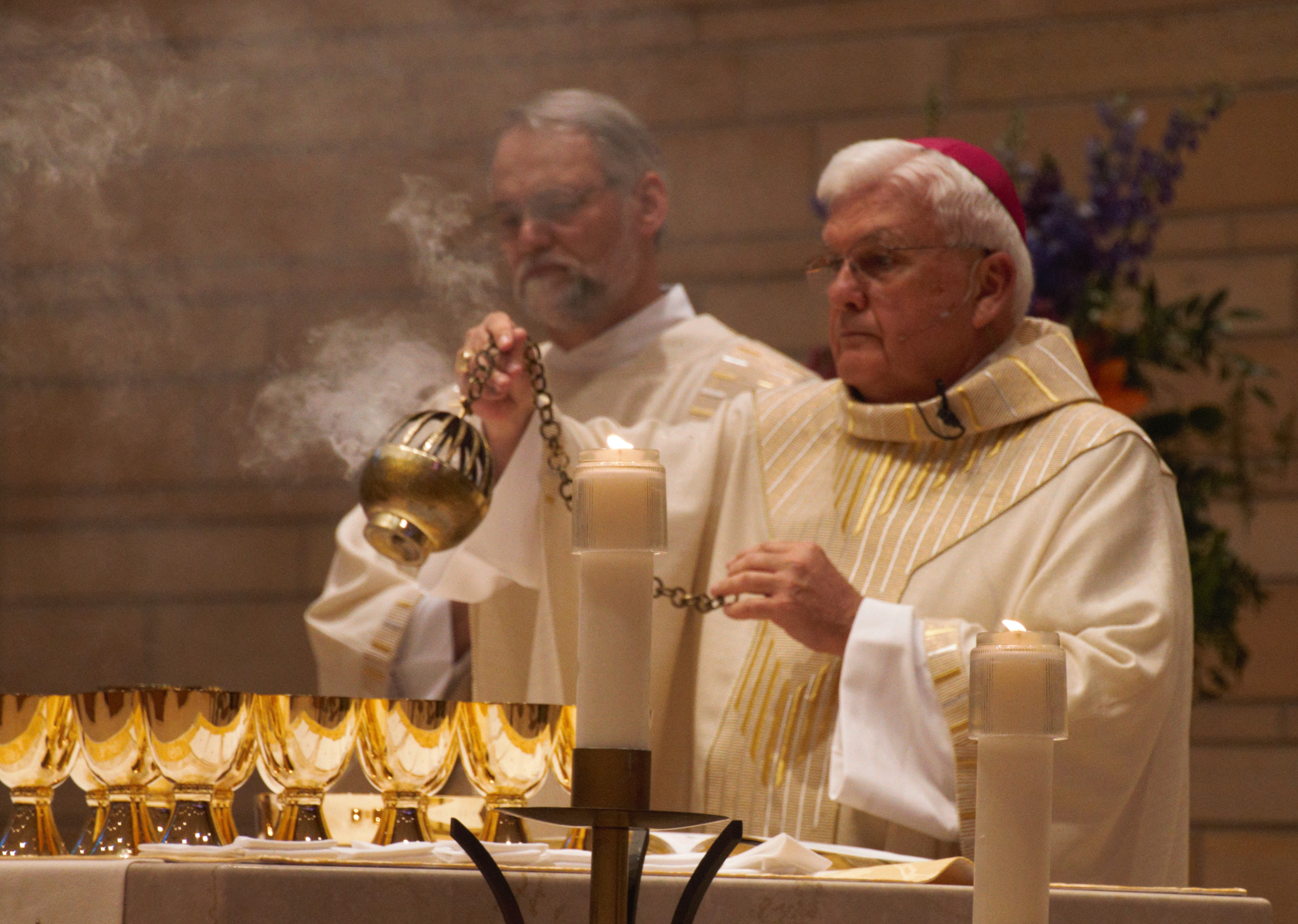
John Michael Quinn, Bishop of Winona-Rochester, swinging a thurible over the offering at Mass

The responsibilities of a thurifer include:

- Holding the thurible open to enable the priest to put incense in it, after which he blesses it with the Sign of the Cross without using any formula of words.
- Carrying the thurible in procession (gently swinging if needed to keep the charcoal burning).
- Presenting the thurible to the priest or deacon when they need to use it.
- Incensing (in the absence of a deacon) the priest and the people after the priest has incensed the offering at Mass.

Another server, previously called a boat boy and now more commonly a boat bearer, may carry a boat or container of incense with a small spoon to add grains as the thurible burns low.

These rules, except for the manner of incensing the offerings at Mass, applied also before 1969. Earlier editions of the Roman Missal prescribe that the offerings be incensed by forming over them with the thurible three crosses and then three circles, the first two anticlockwise and last clockwise, while also saying a prescribed prayer with the words matching the strokes. They also direct that incensing the altar be done with single swings at 29 designated points of an altar attached to the rear wall of the sanctuary, and at 22 points of a freestanding altar.

The 1960 Code of Rubrics, incorporated into the 1962 Roman Missal, envisaged the use of incense at Solemn Mass and Missa cantata, but not at Low Mass.

=== Ambrosian Rite ===
In the Ambrosian Rite, the thurible has no top cover, and is swung clockwise before censing a person or object.

=== Lutheran Rite ===
In the Lutheran Churches, the thurible is carried by an acolyte known as the thurifer.

Its use is normative during the celebration of the Mass, during "the entrance procession (marking the space and the gathered people of God), the gospel procession (marking the highpoint of the Word portion of the service), at the offertory to cense the bread and wine (marking the Meal portion), and at sending (heightening the importance of our ministry in the world)." The Book of the Gospels, the altar, the Eucharistic elements, as well as the priest and faithful are incensed during various portions of the Divine Service.

It is additionally used during the praying of the canonical hours in Lutheran churches: "During Morning Prayer and Evening Prayer the altar is often censed during the Gospel Canticle, connecting daily prayer with its central foundation, the weekly celebration of Holy Communion."

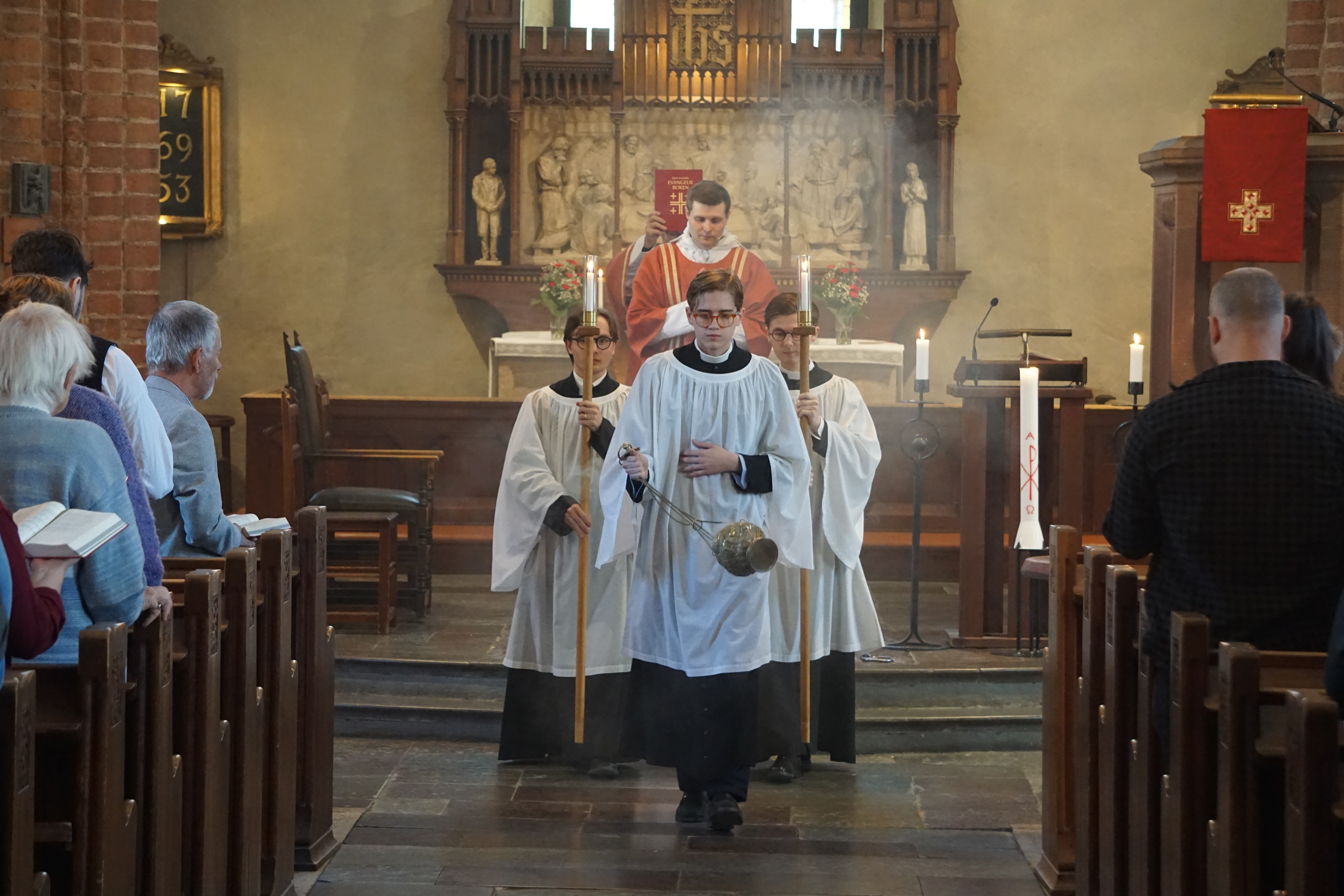
Evangelical-Lutheran acolytes (with the thurifer and torchbearers in the center) during the recessional of the High Mass at Holy Trinity Church in Uppsala on the Feast Day of the Apostles Philip and James the Less

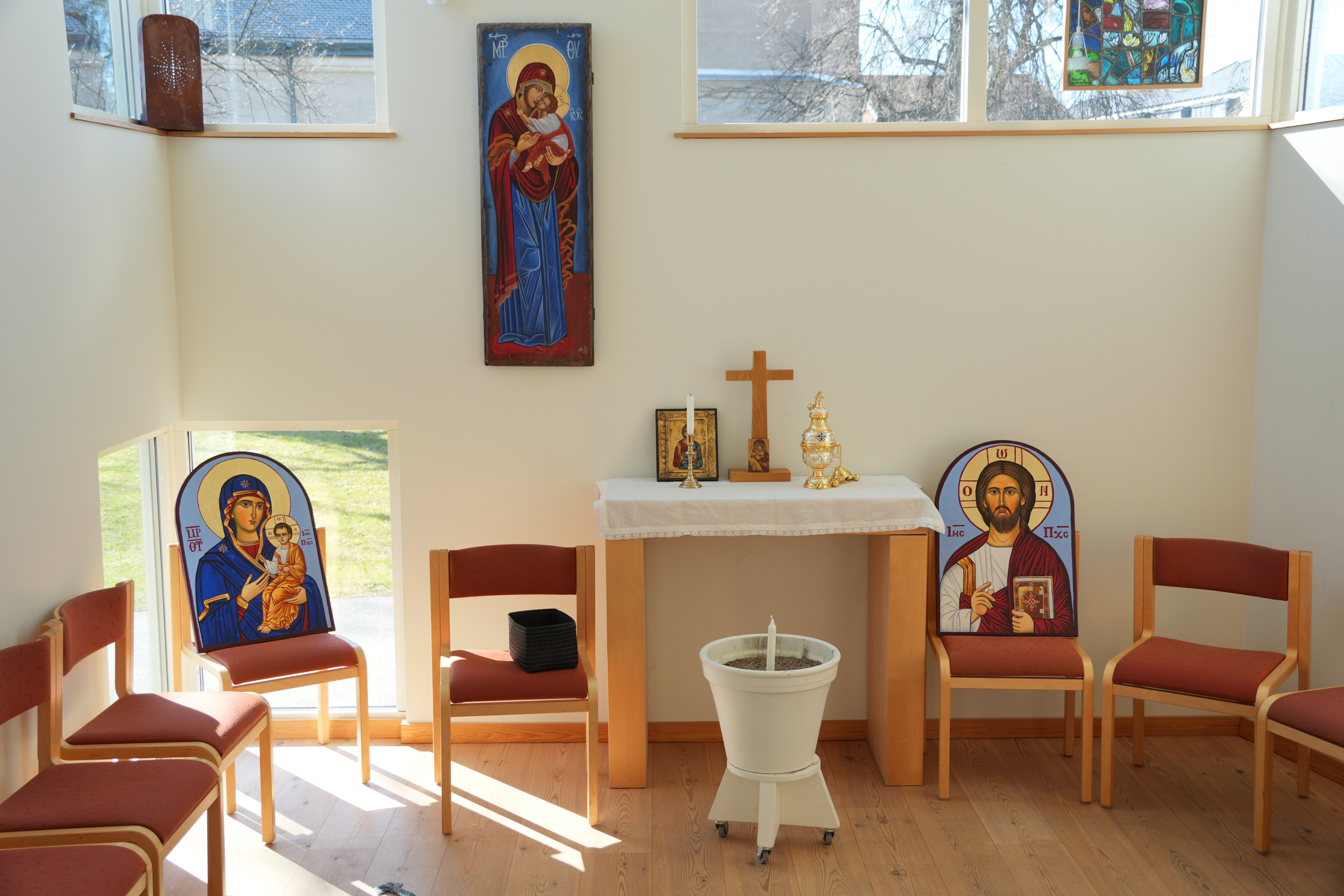
A thurible sits atop the altar of the Lady Chapel of Norrtälje Evangelical-Lutheran Church in Sweden

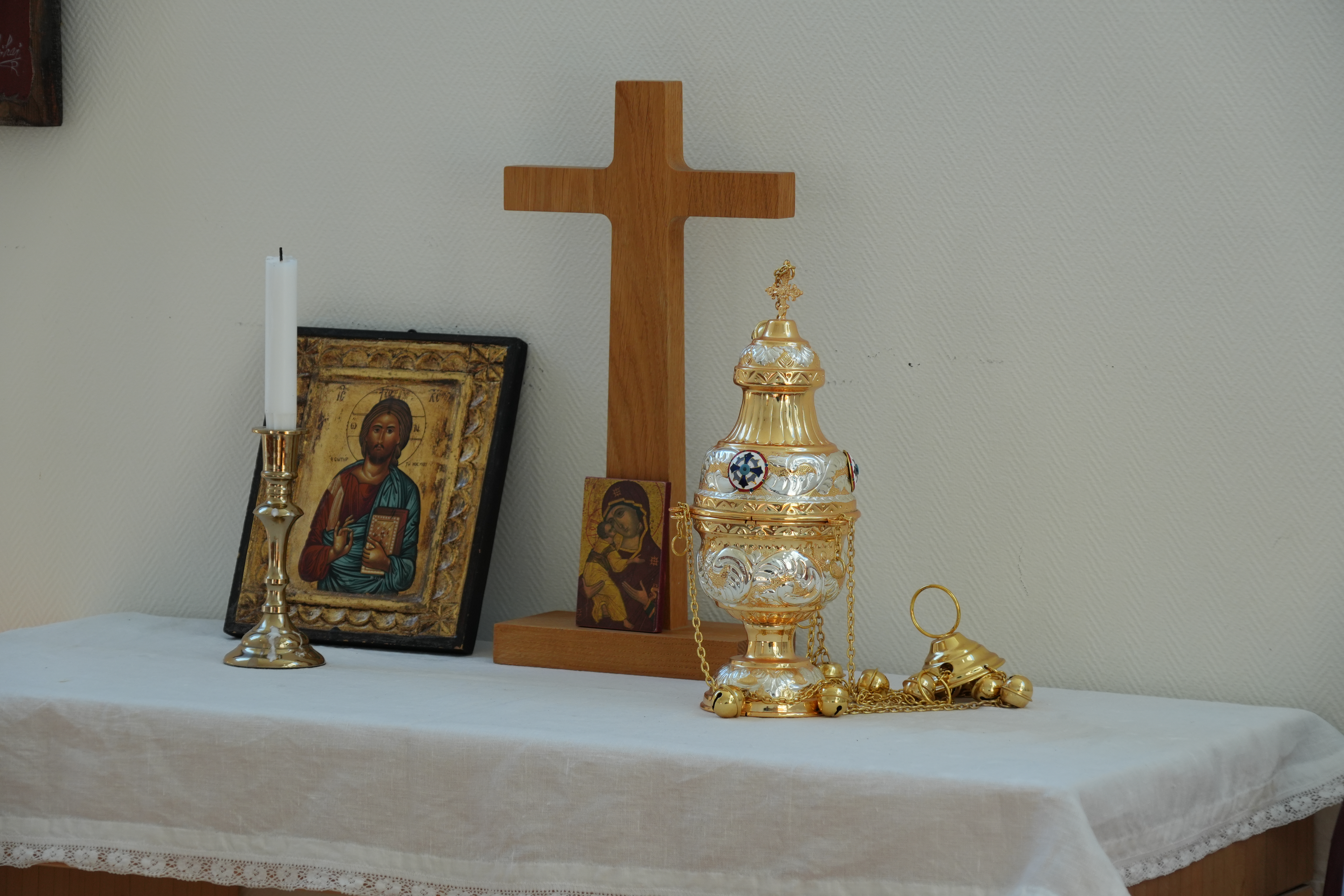
A thurible adjacent to the altar cross of the Marian Chapel of Norrtälje Evangelical-Lutheran Church, part of the Archdiocese of Uppsala

=== Anglican Rite ===
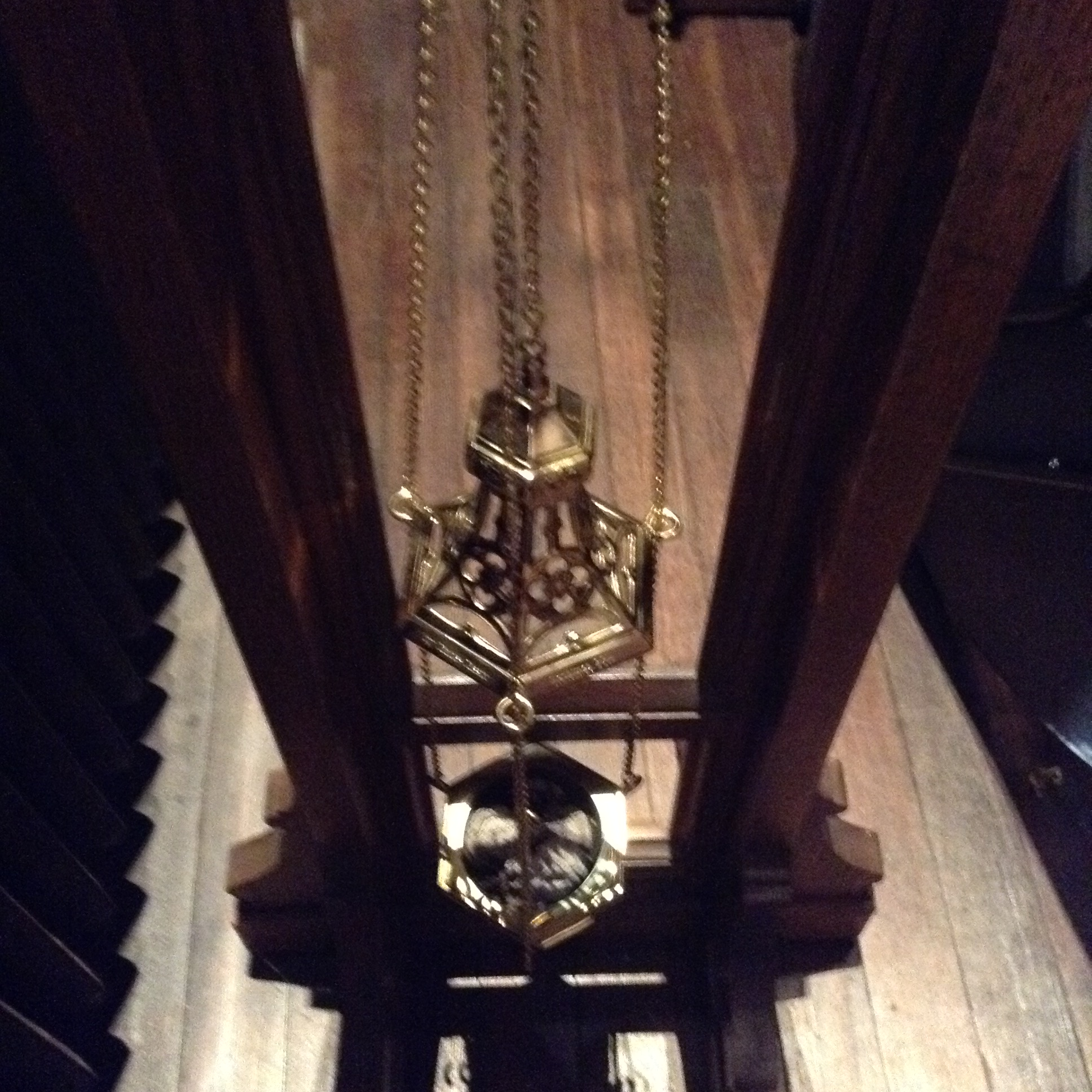
A thurible used in an Anglican church, cover open and hanging from a wooden holder

Use of incense was abandoned in the Church of England by the turn of the 19th century and was later thought to be illegal. Today, the use of incense in an Anglican church is a fairly reliable guide to churchmanship, that is, how 'high' (more Catholic in liturgical style) or how 'low' (more Reformed) the individual church is. Anglo-Catholic churches may use generous quantities of incense. In recent years, some middle-of-the-road Anglican churches have taken to using incense a few times a year for special occasions. The use of incense and chimes is colloquially called "smells and bells" by members of high church parishes, some as an inside joke, while others see it as a pejorative.

The number of points within the liturgy at which an Anglican church may use incense varies. If incense is used at the entrance procession, a thurifer holding the smoking thurible leads the procession and on arrival at the altar the bishop or priest presiding censes it either immediately after the introit or during the Gloria in excelsis Deo, if this is sung. Incense may also be used at the reading of the gospel: after the announcement of the gospel, the book is censed left, centre and right.

If an Anglican church uses incense at only one point of the service, it does so at the offertory. The gifts and the altar are first censed; then follows censing of the priest (three swings of the thurible), of the other clergy (single swing to the gospel side and another to the epistle side), the choir (single or triple swing to either side) and the congregation (a swing to the gospel side, another to the epistle side and another to the middle).

Incense is also used at Solemn Evensong, which by definition is a sung celebration of vespers with use of incense.

=== Byzantine Rite ===
The Eastern Orthodox Church, as well as the Byzantine Rite Eastern Catholic Churches and Eastern Lutheran Churches, make frequent use of incense, not only at the Divine Liturgy (Eucharist), but also at Vespers, Matins and a number of other occasional services (see Euchologion). During funeral services and memorial services (Panikhida), the censer is swung almost continuously.

Incense is understood as symbolizing the sanctifying grace of the Holy Spirit and the prayers of the Saints rising to heaven. Incense is offered by the priest or deacon during the services. In some traditions, the ecclesiarch (sacristan) and his assistant (paraecclesiarch) performs the censing at specific moments of the service.

The thurible (Greek: Θυμιατο, Thymiato; Church Slavonic: Кадило, Кадильница, kadilnitsa) is usually silver, brass or gold plated (combining in itself at the offering of incense the three gifts of the Biblical Magi: gold, frankincense, and myrrh). The thurible consists of a metal bowl (usually with a base so it can stand upright) into which the charcoal and incense are placed, and a lid (often topped with a cross), pierced by holes to allow the fragrance from the incense to escape. The censer usually has three outer chains (for the Holy Trinity) attached to the bowl, and a fourth inner chain (for the Oneness of God) attached to the lid. The three outer chains are gathered together and attached to a round conical plate attached to a ring; the inner chain passes through a hole in the conical plate and is attached to another ring to make it easier to lift the lid. In the Greek and some Russian practice twelve bells are attached to the chains (their ringing symbolizes the teaching of the twelve Apostles). Sometimes the bowl and lid of the thurible are decorated with crosses or icons in repousse, and may even be decorated with semi-precious stones. When not in use the thurible is usually hung from a hook in the sanctuary.

When censing, the priest or deacon holds the censer below the conical plate with only the right hand, allowing it to swing freely. He makes the Sign of the Cross with the censer by making two vertical swings and a third horizontal swing (the three swings together symbolizing the Holy Trinity).

When the temple (church building) is censed, the deacon or priest proceeds in a clockwise direction, moving to his right as he censes in order the Holy Table (altar), sanctuary, Iconostasis, walls of the temple, clergy and faithful. There are two types of censing: a Greater Censing (which encompasses the entire temple and all of the people therein), and a Lesser Censing (which, depending upon the liturgical context, consists of censing only a portion of the temple and the people).

During some censings, especially the Greater Censing, the clergyman who is performing the censing often carries a candle in his left hand. During Bright Week (the week which begins on Easter Sunday) the priest and the deacon carries special Paschal candles at every censing, even the Lesser Censing. While carrying the Paschal candles, the priest or deacon greets the members of the congregation with the Paschal greeting while censing them. Simple tapers are carried while censing during funerals and memorial services.

During the Eastern Roman Empire (Byzantine Empire) the emperor used to be permitted to offer incense on the Feast of the Nativity (no doubt as a memorial of the gifts of the Magi), but was permitted to perform no other priestly function.

If no priest is available, incense may be offered by a reader or senior layman, but with a hand censer which has no chains on it, but rather a handle (it often has bells as well, suspended from the handle or around the rim). The hand censer is also used in some monasteries even when a priest is present for certain censings which are done by a monastic other than a vested priest or deacon.

During Holy Week it is customary in some places for even the priest and deacon to use the hand censer for all of the censings, as a sign of humility and mourning at the Passion of Christ.

The faithful often burn incense, using a hand censer, in the home during Morning and Evening Prayers, and it is not unusual for the head of the household to bless the Holy Icons and all of the members of the household with a hand censer.

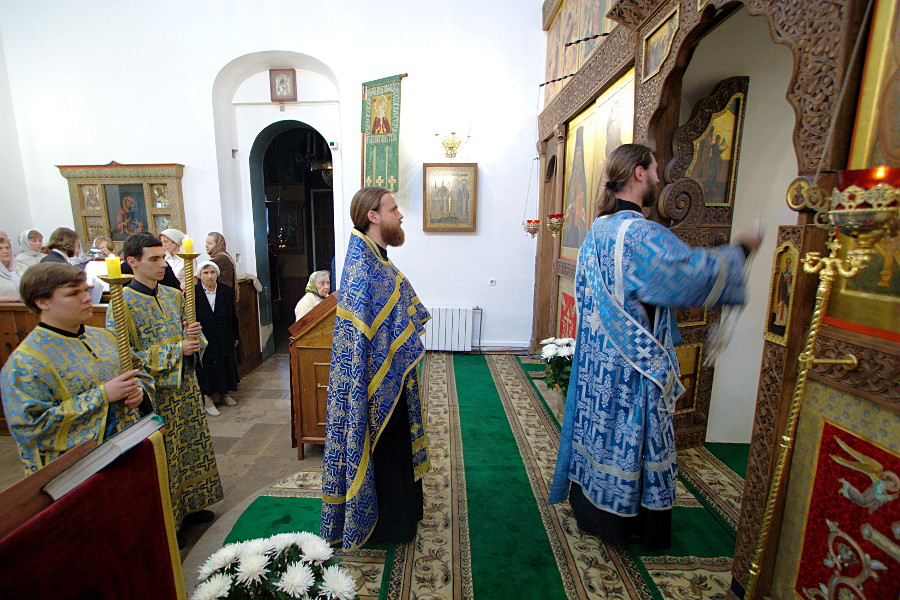
Orthodox priest and deacon making the Entrance with the censer at Great Vespers

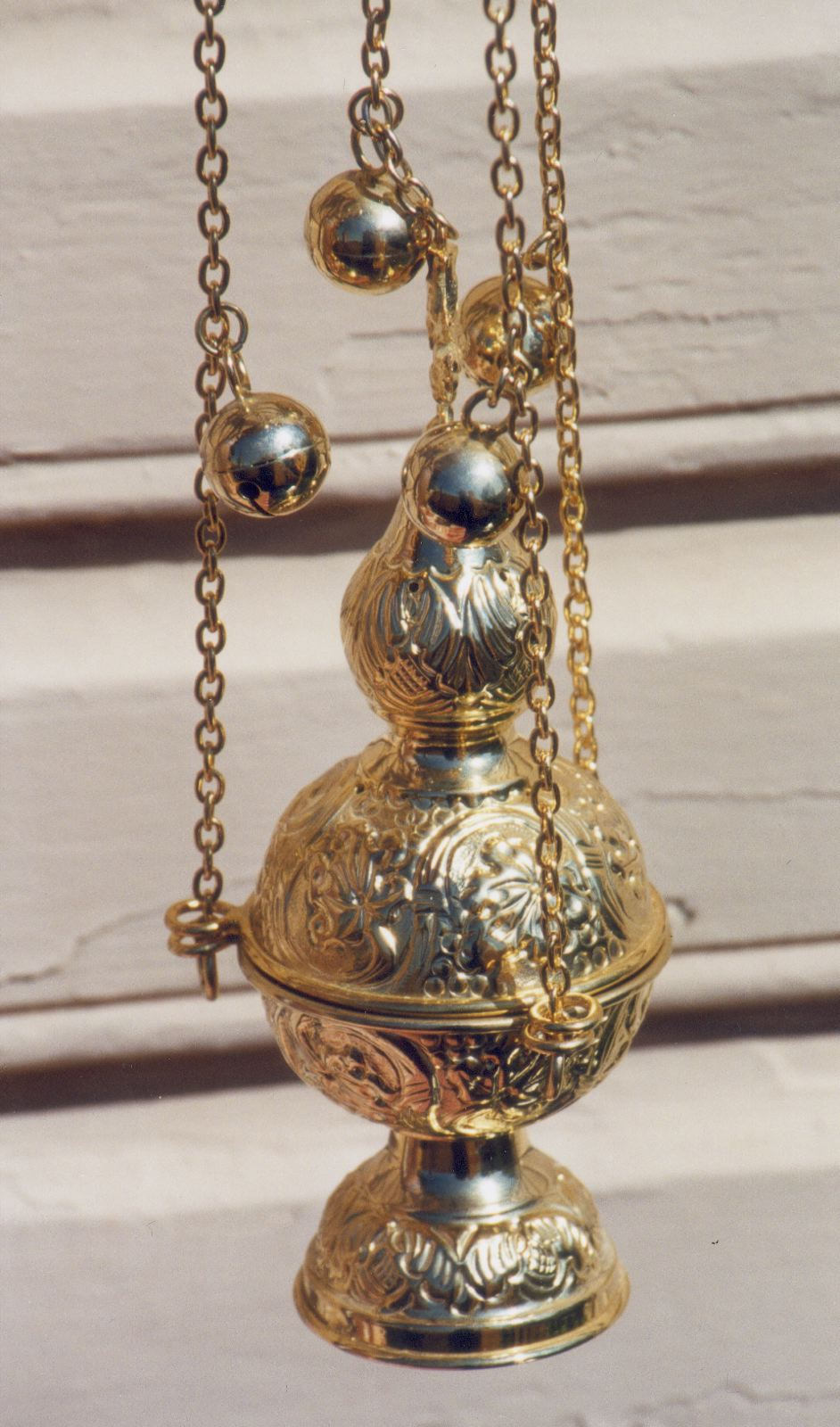
An Eastern Orthodox censer, gold with four chains and bells

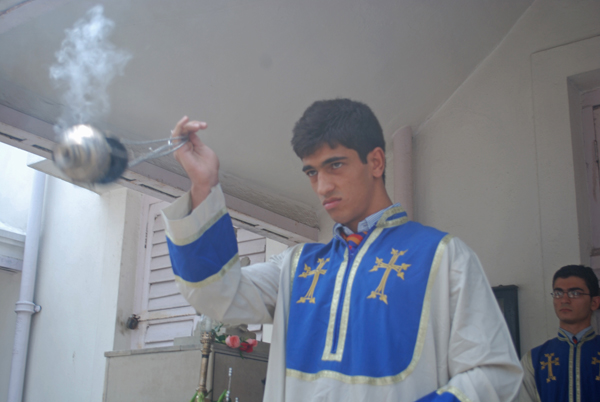
Armenian Church, Kolkata

== Boat bearer ==
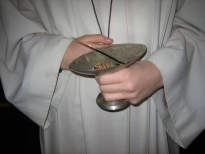
An incense boat, held by a boat bearer

The boat boy or boat bearer is a junior altar server position found in Catholic, Lutheran and Anglican churches. The role of a boat boy is to assist the thurifer, the senior altar server who carries the thurible. The boat bearer carries the incense boat, a small metal container, Latin navicula, which holds the supplies of incense. The boat has a small spoon inside, Latin cochlearium, which is used to transfer the grains of incense onto the red-hot charcoals in the thurible. Although at times the boat bearer transfers the incense himself, more usually he simply holds the boat open as the priest performs this task.

== References in culture and literature ==
In "The Miller's Tale" of Geoffrey Chaucer's The Canterbury Tales, it is noted that Absolon, "Gooth with a sencer [Middle English spelling of censer] on the haliday, / Sensynge the wyves of the parisshe faste; / And many a lovely look on hem he caste" (lines 3340–3342).

== See also ==
- Botafumeiro
- Censer
- Incense offering
- Religious use of incense
