= Quintana Square =

Square in Santiago de Compostela, Spain

Plaza de la Quintana
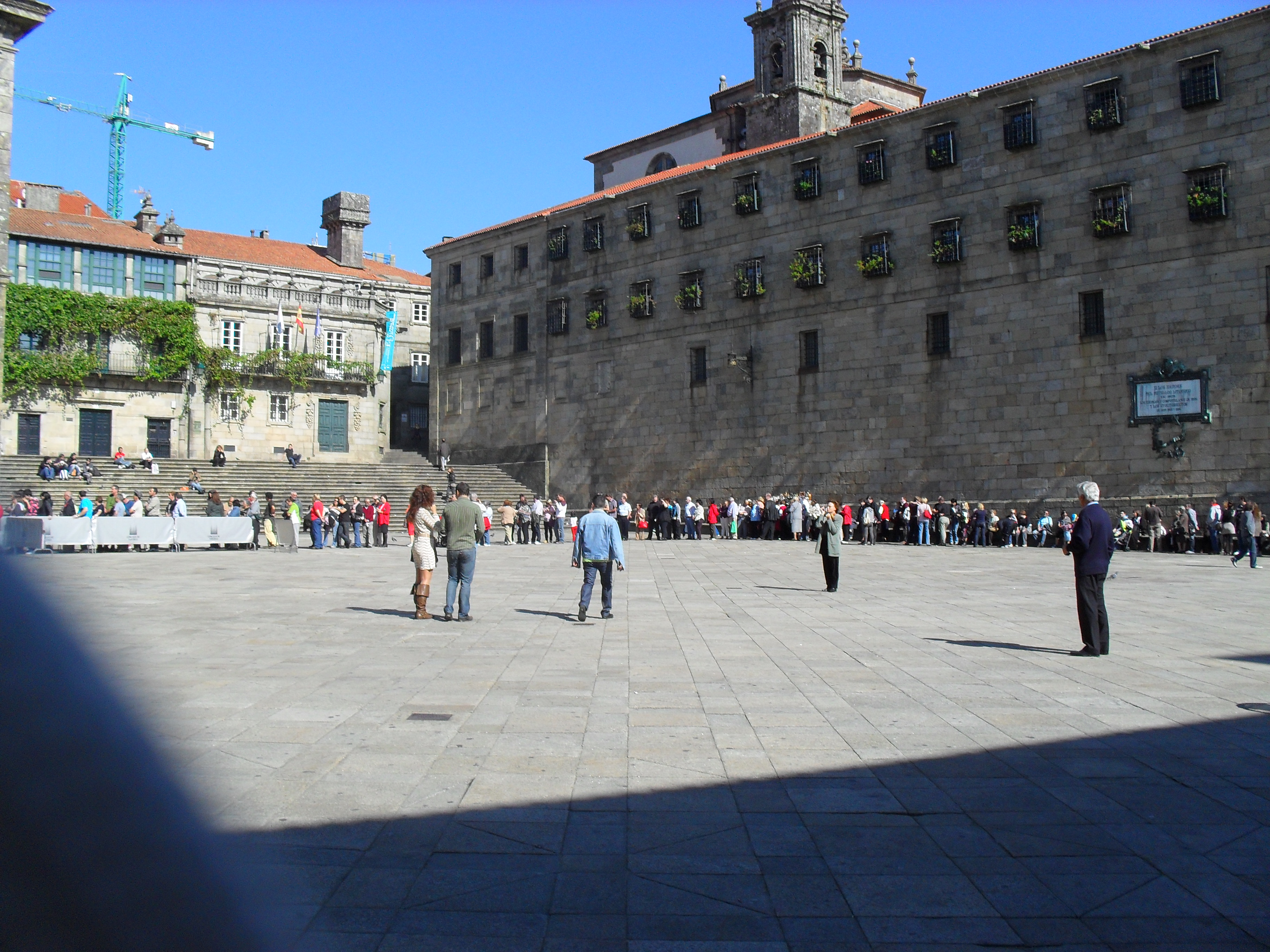
- View of the plaza
- Interactive map of Plaza de la Quintana
- Native name: Praza da Quintana (Galician)
- Type: Plaza
- Location: Santiago de Compostela, Spain
- Coordinates: 42°52′50″N 08°32′37″W

Construction
- Completion: 1611

Quintana Square (Spanish: Plaza de la Quintana; Galician: Praza da Quintana) is the main square of Santiago de Compostela, Galicia, Spain. It is formed by the meeting of the south facade of Santiago de Compostela Cathedral, Casa da Parra, Monastery of Saint Pelagius of Antealtares and Casa da Conga.

== History ==
A "quintana" is a street in a Roman camp, that separates the fifth and sixth maniples and contains the marketplace. The area of Quintana Square was once a cemetery. The square was built around 1611, following the decision of the Mayor of Compostela to convert the medieval cemetery known as Quintana de Mortos into a public square. This is now the "Quintana de Mortos" (English: Quintana of the dead) on the lower level of the square. The cemetery's remains were first moved to the Convent of San Domingos de Bonaval and then to Boisaca cemetery. Masters Francisco Fernández de Araújo and José de la Peña de Toro were commissioned by the Santiago de Compostela Cathedral's canon José Vega y Verdugo. At the same time, the construction closed the eastern facade of the cathedral with a running wall, like a screen, that covered the main and the apse chapels.

== Description ==
The plaza is divided by a staircase, which separates the so-called "Quintana de Vivos" (English: Quintana of the living) at the higher level from the "Quintana de Mortos" on the level below.

During a Jacobean Holy Year (years when Saint James' Day, 25 July, falls on a Sunday), pilgrims cross the plaza to enter the basilica through the Holy Door to efarn a plenary indulgence granted by Pope Alexander III in his 1179 bull, Regis aeterni.

It is a widely used public space for events: gatherings for Galician Literature Day, National Day of Galicia, demonstrations or commemorations (i.e., Plataforma Nunca Máis. Artists such as Susana Seivane use the space for musical concerts and performances. In the "canzorros" at the top of Casa da Parra there is a CRTVG webcam, that updates its image every two seconds and covers approximately a 90º viewing angle of the plaza.

== Literary Battalion ==
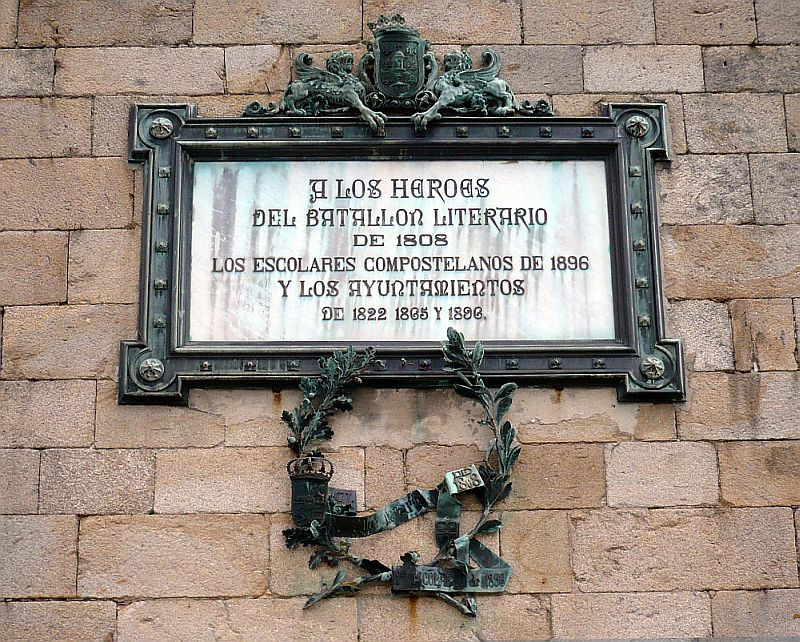
The plaque in Quintana Plaza

A plaque in the plaza commemorates the work of the Literary Battalion during the Spanish War of Independence with the inscription:

A LOS HEROES DEL BATALLON LITERARIO DE 1808
LOS ESCOLARES COMPOSTELANOS DE 1896 Y LOS AYUNTAMIENTOS DE 1822 1865 Y 1896

(To the heroes of the Literary Battalion of 1808
The Compostela scholars of 1896 and the city councils of 1822 1865 and 1896)

== See also ==
- Praza de Cervantes
- Praza do Paraíso
- Plaza del Obradoiro
- Berenguela tower
