= Botafumeiro =

Giant thurible in Santiago de Compostela Cathedral

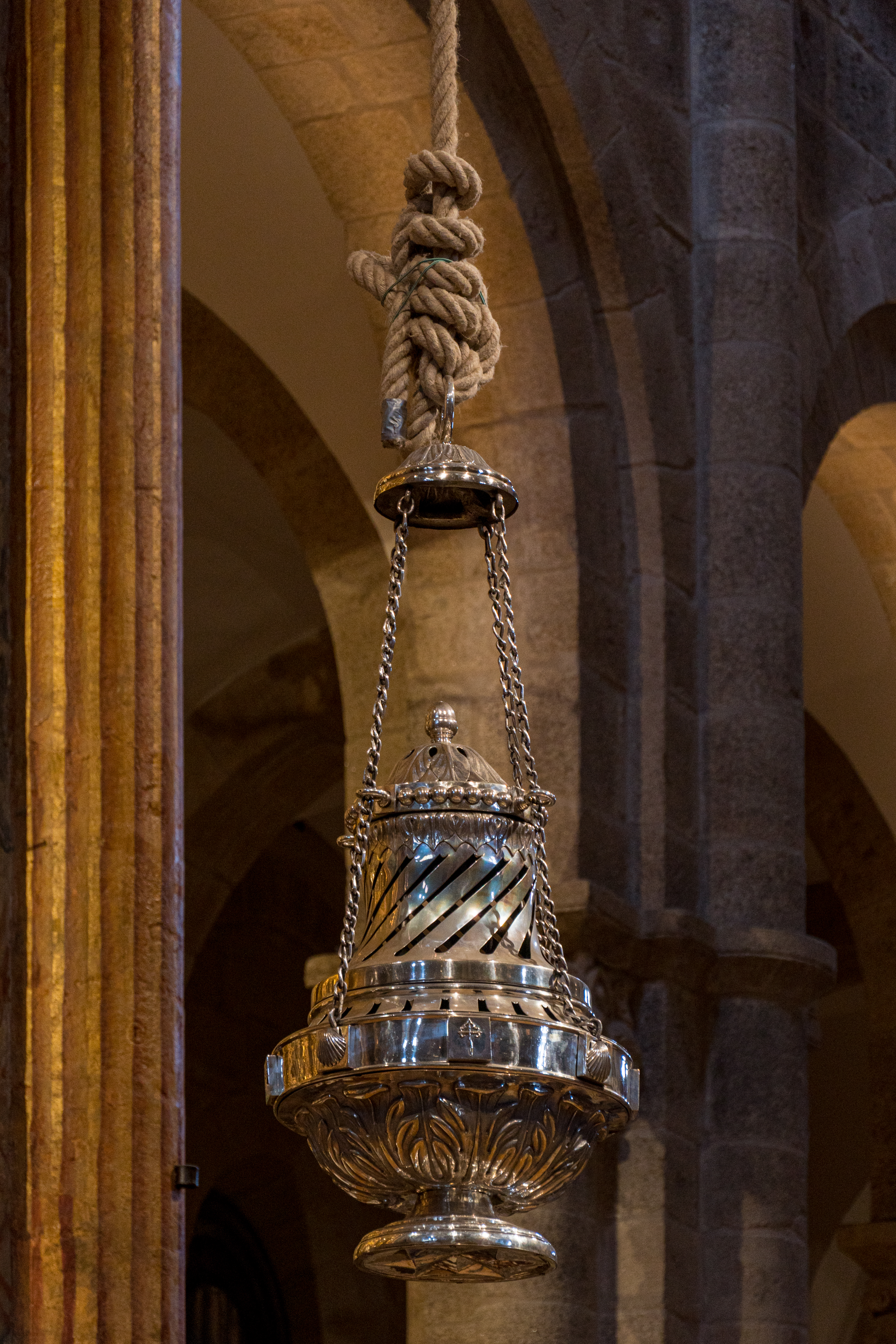
The currently used Botafumeiro, made in 2013.

The Botafumeiro is a famous thurible used at the Santiago de Compostela Cathedral, in Spain. Its name comes from the Galician language, where botar means "to eject, to throw away, to expel", and the Latin fume, meaning "smoke".

It is considered a symbol of both the cathedral and the city. The Botafumeiro is especially celebrated for its swinging motion during the Pilgrim's Mass and other solemn dates, where it can reach speeds of about 68 km/h. This ritual has been taking place since at least the 12th century.

== Description ==
The current Botafumeiro is made of an alloy of brass and bronze and is plated by a very thin 20-micrometre layer of silver. It was created by the gold and silversmith José Losada in 1851 and has a golden sheen.

The Santiago de Compostela Botafumeiro is one of the largest censers in the world, weighing 80 kg and measuring 1.93 m in height. It is normally on display in the library of the cathedral, but for certain important religious occasions, like the Feast of Saint James, it is brought to the floor of the cathedral and attached to a rope hung from the pulley mechanism.

There is another large thurible used in the other masses carried out in the cathedral, called La Alcachofa (literally, 'the Artichoke') or La Repollo (literally, 'the Cabbage'). La Alcachofa is a silver-colored metal censer. It was created in 2013 by the sacred art artisans working under the craftsman Luis Molina Acedo.

The Botafumeiro is suspended 20 m from a pulley mechanism under the dome on the roof of the church. The current pulley mechanism was installed in 1604, and may be the world's oldest parametric amplifier.

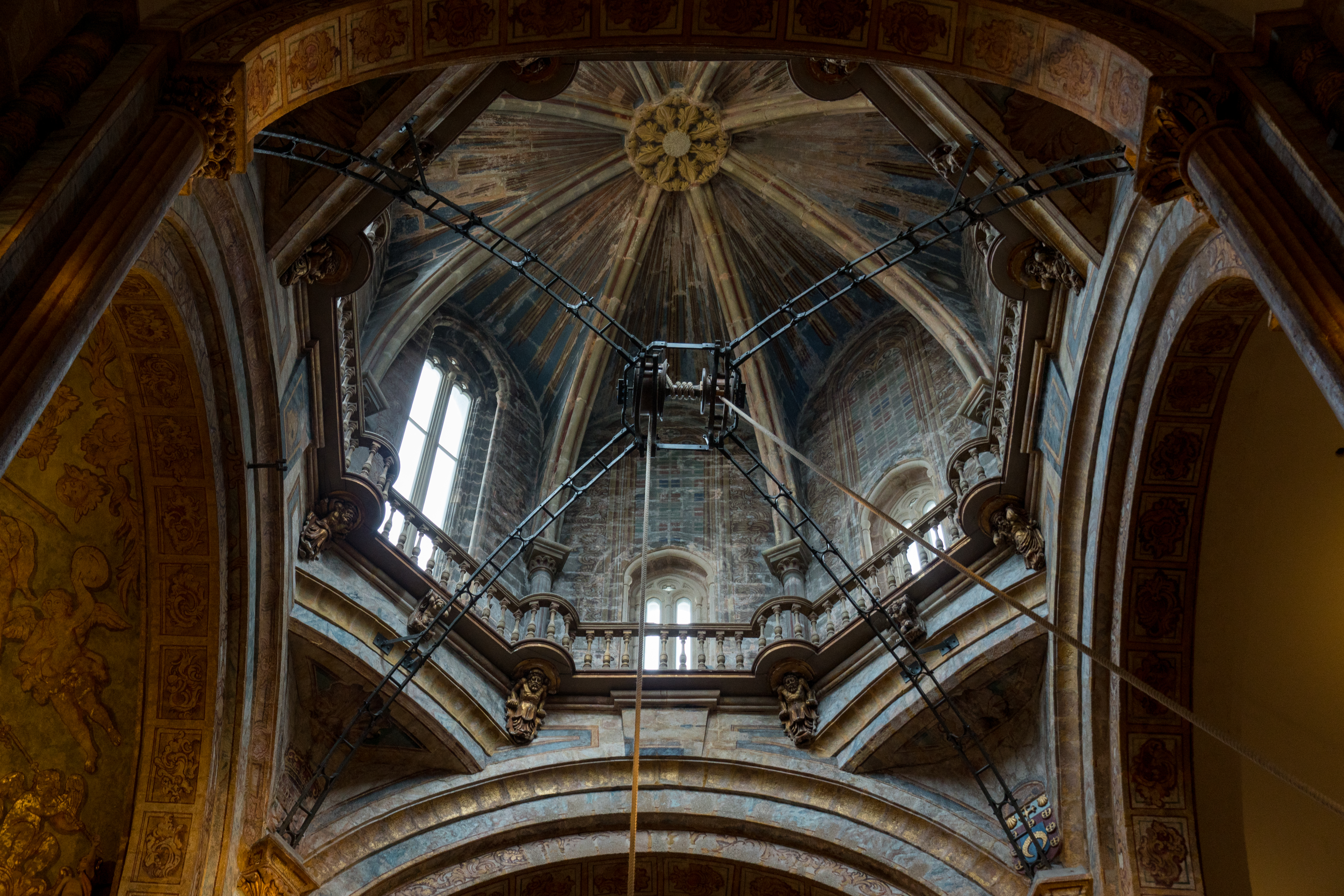
The pulley mechanism under the transept's dome.

The ropes typically last about 20 years before they have to be replaced. However, recently a thicker rope than usual was used, and the extra rubbing produced premature wear of the rope. Therefore, this thicker rope had to be replaced sooner than had been expected, in 2004. Before 2004, the ropes were woven from hemp, or a type of grass called esparto, and made in Vigo, Spain. Since 2004, a rope made of synthetic material has been used.

The censer is pushed initially to start its motion. Eight mauve-robed tiraboleiros pull the ropes, producing increasingly large oscillations of the censer. The thurible's swings almost reach the ceiling of the transept. The incensory can reach speeds of 68 km/h as it dispenses thick clouds of incense.

At the top of the swing, the Botafumeiro reaches heights of 21 meters. It swings in a 65-meter arc between the Azabachería and Praterias doorways at the ends of the transept. The maximum angle achieved is about 82°. The maximum can be reached after about 17 cycles, and requires about 80 seconds of swinging.

Numerous sources report different weights of the Botafumeiro ranging from 50 kilograms to 160 kilograms.

== Operating dates ==
The Botafumeiro officially operates during these solemn dates:

- 6 January: Epiphany
- Between 22 March and 25 April in the Gregorian calendar: Easter
- Between 30 April and 3 June in the Gregorian calendar: Feast of the Ascension (39 days after Easter)
- 23 May: The Apparition of the Apostle-Clavijo
- Between 10 May and 13 June in the Gregorian calendar: Pentecost (50 days after Easter)
- 25 July: The Feast of Saint James
- 15 August: Assumption of Mary
- 1 November: All Saints' Day
- 20–26 November: Feast of Christ the King (Last Sunday of the liturgical year)
- 8 December: Immaculate Conception
- 25 December: Christmas
- 30 December: Transfer of the Body of James the Apostle to Galicia

A private thurible "performance" is available for about €450.

== Tiraboleiros ==
The Botafumeiro is carried and swung by eight men in mauve capes called roupóns, known as tiraboleiros. The term tiraboleiro derives from the Latin turibularium (incensary), from which comes thuribularii, meaning 'incense carrier or smoke spreader'. The English equivalent is thurifer. There is a comparable term in Spanish, turiferario.

== History ==
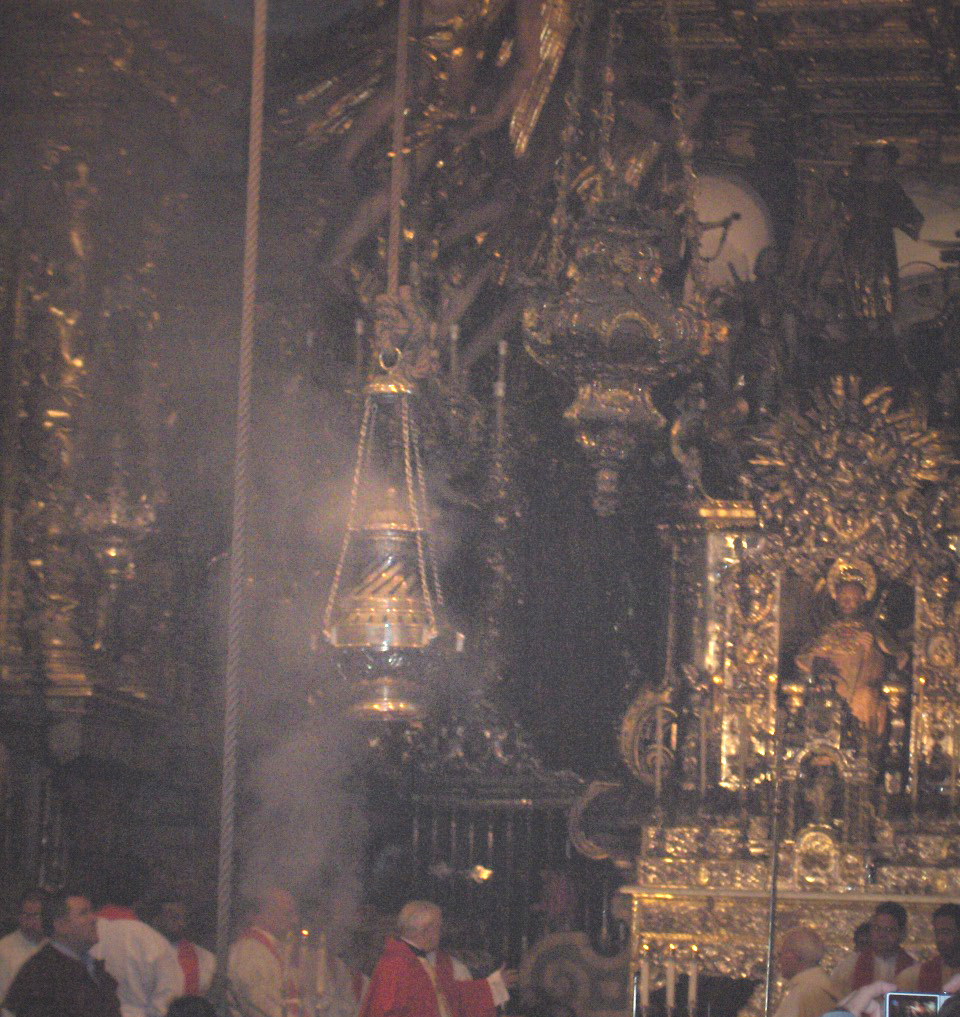
The swinging Botafumeiro dispensing clouds of incense.

One tradition has it that the use of a swinging censer in the Santiago de Compostela Cathedral began in the 11th century, though the earliest documented reference is an annotation in the Codex Calixtinus, where it is referred to as Turibulum Magnum, placing it firmly in the 12th century. Arriving pilgrims were tired and unwashed. It was also believed that incense smoke had a prophylactic effect at the time of plagues and epidemics. Incense burning is also an important part of the liturgy, being an "oration to God", or form of prayer.

In the 13th century, the pulley mechanism was changed to incorporate a set of coaxial drums of different diameters. Without this innovation, the largest excursion of the Botafumeiro would be about 1.5 meters, the length of the rope pulled by the tiraboleiros.

In the 15th century, France's King Louis XI (1423–1483) donated money to the cathedral to replace their medieval thurible, which was made of silver. A new silver thurible was put into service in 1554. Unfortunately, this ornate vessel was stolen by Napoleon's troops in April, 1809, during an episode in the Spanish War of Independence (1808–1814). Therefore, the Louis XI censer was replaced by the present less-ostentatious Losada thurible in 1851.

After 155 years of use, the Botafumeiro was restored in early 2006 by artisans and craftsmen working under Luis Molina Acedo. They repaired the dents and cracks in the Botafumeiro and reapplied a 20 micrometre thick plating of silver to the vessel.

Many other cathedrals had similar large thuribles at one time. However, most of the other cathedrals discontinued the use of their swinging censers over the years.

== Accidents ==
Over the years, a number of accidents have occurred during the swinging of the Botafumeiro. Apparently at one time, the Botafumeiro was attached to the rope with a hook which sometimes became disconnected.

One of the most renowned accidents took place during a visit of Princess Catherine of Aragon. The incident occurred on 25 July 1499, during the Feast of Saint James, when a mass was held in her honor. While it was being swung, the Botafumeiro flew out of the cathedral through the Platerias high window. No one was reported to have been injured on this occasion.

The ropes and other devices securing the Botafumeiro have also failed; on May 23, 1622, and more recently in 1925 and July 1937. In 1622, the Botafumeiro fell at the feet of the tiraboleiros. In July 1937, the cords holding the Botafumeiro failed again, and hot coals were spilled onto the floor.

Current procedure is to attach the rope to the Botafumeiro with a set of sailor's knots.

== Footnotes and references ==
- Sanmartín, Juan R. (October 1984). "O Botafumeiro: Parametric pumping in the Middle Age". American Journal of Physics. 52 (10): 937–945. Bibcode:1984AmJPh..52..937S. doi:10.1119/1.13798.
