= Jacobean Holy Year =

Catholic celebration in Galicia, Spain

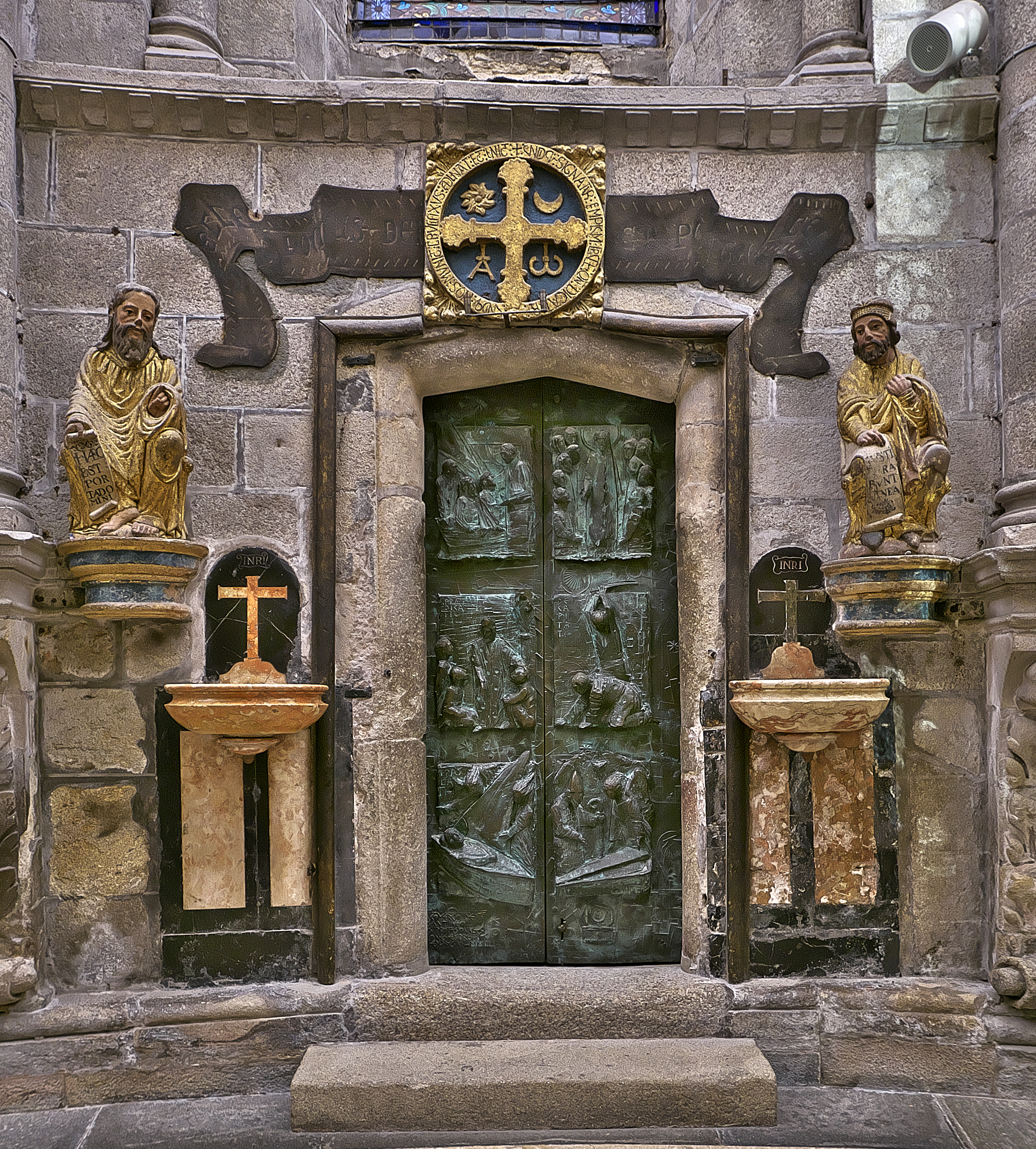
Holy door (Cathedral of Santiago de Compostela)

A Jacobean Holy Year (Galician: Ano Santo Xacobeo), also known as the Compostela Holy Year, is a Catholic celebration that takes place in the Spanish city of Santiago de Compostela, Galicia. It occurs in the years in which 25 July, the Feast of Saint James, falls on a Sunday. This occurs with a regular cadence of (6, 5, 6, 11) years, so that fourteen Jacobean Holy Years are celebrated every century (except when the last year of a century is not a leap year, resulting in a lapse of 7 or 12 years).

The celebration of each holy year grants a plenary indulgence to all those faithful who: visit the Santiago de Compostela Cathedral, say a prayer (at least the Apostles' Creed or the Our Father), and pray for the intentions of the Pope. It is also recommended to attend Holy Mass and receive the sacraments of penance and communion; that is, to confess and take communion (in the fifteen days before or after the visit to the cathedral). It is customary, moreover, to access the cathedral through the Holy Door, which is opened only on the occasion of the Holy Year.

== Background ==
The Holy Year of Compostela was established in 1122 (to first occur in 1126) by Pope Callixtus II, who had completed a pilgrimage to Santiago de Compostela when he was Archbishop of Vienne, France.

On 27 February 1120, Callixtus' bull Omnipotentis Dispositione elevated Santiago de Compostela to archiepiscopal dignity, transferring the metropolitan see of Mérida to this city, in accordance with the wishes of Diego Gelmírez, the first archbishop of the Archdiocese of Santiago de Compostela, and with the consent of King Alfonso VII of León. (Callixtus was the king's uncle, by the marriage of his brother Raymond of Burgundy with the Infanta Urraca of León, daughter of Alfonso VI of León.)

In 1122, coinciding with the laying of the last stone of the Santiago de Compostela Cathedral, Calixtus granted the privilege of regularly celebrating the Jacobean Holy Year from 1126, provided that the Feast of Saint James (25 July) fell on a Sunday so that the same graces that were granted in Rome in the jubilee years (which were then held every 25 years) could be earned in Compostela.

This privilege was confirmed and extended by later pontiffs including Pope Eugene III, and Pope Anastasius IV. Alexander III, in the bull Regis aeterni of 25 July 1178, declared the perpetual character of the privilege and equated it to those of Rome and Jerusalem. Such provisions extraordinarily boosted during the Middle Ages the rise of pilgrimages from all over Europe through the Camino de Santiago.

Recent celebrations have been observed in 1993, 1999, 2004 and 2010. The most recent, 2021, was extended one year due to the COVID-19 pandemic in Spain. This was the second time that the Jacobean Holy Year had been celebrated for two consecutive years. The first was during the Spanish Civil War, in which the holy year of 1937 was also extended throughout 1938, as granted by Pope Pius XI at the request of the Compostela prelate Tomás Muniz de Pablos.

During a Jacobean holy year, pilgrims may enter the cathedral through the holy door (Porta Santa) to gain a plenary indulgence. During a holy year, the lantern of the Berenguela Tower is lit throughout the year, otherwise it stays unlit. The light acts as a lighthouse to guide pilgrims to the cathedral during the holy years.

== Calendar calculations ==
The cadence (6, 5, 6, 11) of the Jacobean years during the 19th and 20th centuries can be explained by the rhythm of leap years and the fact that the week has seven days. If there were no leap years, there would be a Jacobean year every seven years. Because years divisible by 100 are only leap years when they are also divisible by 400, at the turn of a century a gap of seven or twelve years can be given between two consecutive holy years.

If there is any alteration in the leap sequence, the cadence of the Jacobean years will also be altered. This happened with the Gregorian reform of the year 1582 and, consequently, also happens in centenary years that are not multiples of 400.

Table of the Jacobean Holy Years
28 Jacobean Holy Years in XX and XXI Centuries
	+6	+5	+6	+11
+28	1909 (+12)	1915	1920	1926
+28	1937–1938	1943	1948	1954
+28	1965	1971	1976	1982
+28	1993	1999	2004	2010
+28	2021–2022	2027	2032	2038
+28	2049	2055	2060	2066
+28	2077	2083	2088	2094

This table is correct for the 20th and 21st centuries, since the year 2000 was a leap year. The cadence will change in the following centuries, since the years 2100, 2200 and 2300 will not be leap years (they are evenly divisible by one hundred, but not by four hundred). The last holy year of the 21st century will be 2094; the first of the 22nd century will be 2106 (12 years later), and the following will be 2117 (11 years later), resuming the (6, 5, 6, 11) cadence.

A year is a Jacobean Holy Year if and only if it is either a common year starting on Friday or a leap year starting on Thursday (except for special circumstances, such as for 1938 and for 2022, as noted earlier in this article). In terms of dominical letters, the year must have dominical letter C or DC.

== Other celebrations ==
Apart from being celebrated in Santiago de Compostela, the Jacobean Holy Year is also celebrated in other Spanish towns, such as in Gáldar, Canary Islands. Gáldar was granted the privilege by a papal bull issued by Pope Paul VI in 1965, and in 1993 John Paul II granted it in perpetuity.

== See also ==
- Mother Parish of the Apostle Santiago (Los Realejos)
