= Monastery of Saint Pelagius of Antealtares =

Monastery in Santiago de Compostela, Spain

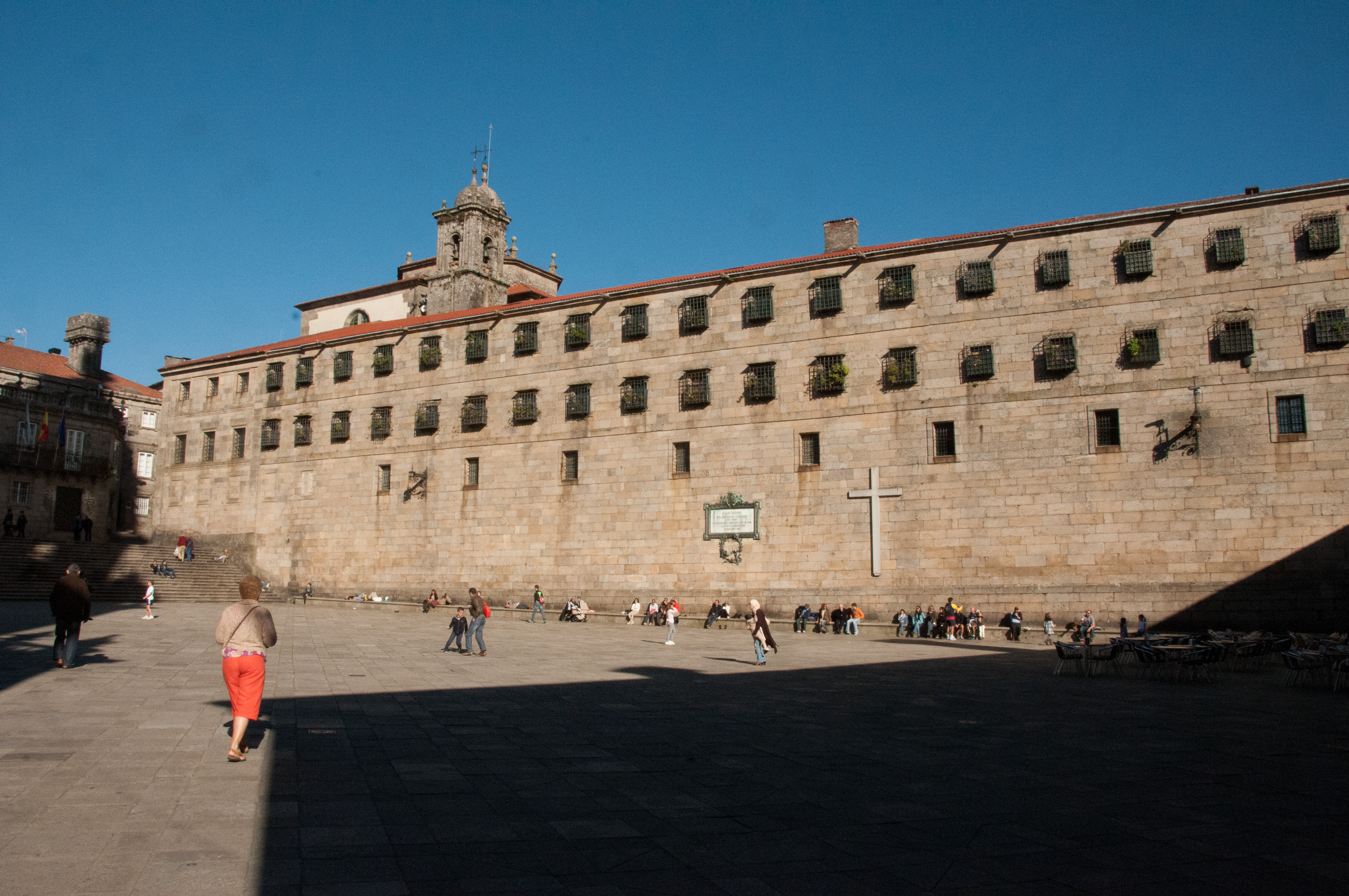
- Facade of San Paio de Antealtares in Quintana Square

Religion
- Affiliation: Roman Catholic
- Ecclesiastical or organizational status: Monastery

Location
- Location: Santiago de Compostela, Galicia, Spain
- Interactive map of Monastery of Saint Pelagius of Antealtares
- Coordinates: 42°52′50″N 8°32′35″W

Architecture
- Style: Baroque, Neoclassical

The Monastery of Saint Pelagius of Antealtares (Galician: Mosteiro de San Paio de Antealtares) is a monastery in Santiago de Compostela, Galicia, Spain.

== Background ==
The monastery was founded in the 11th century by Alfonso II of Asturias as a Benedictine monastery originally staffed by twelve monks. It was initially aimed to look after and render worship to the newly discovered tomb of the Apostle James, which brought a pilgrimage status to the city.

Once the Benedictine monks left the monastery in 1499, it was occupied by cloistered nuns and dedicated to Pelagius of Córdoba, a 10th-century Galician child captured, martyred by order of the Caliph Abd-ar-Rahman III of al-Andalus after his refusal to renounce of his Christian faith. The present-day construction is almost entirely from the 17th and 18th centuries.

== See also ==
- Plaza de la Quintana
- Casa da Parra
