= Feast of Saint James =

Festival commemorating Christian apostle

Saint James' Day
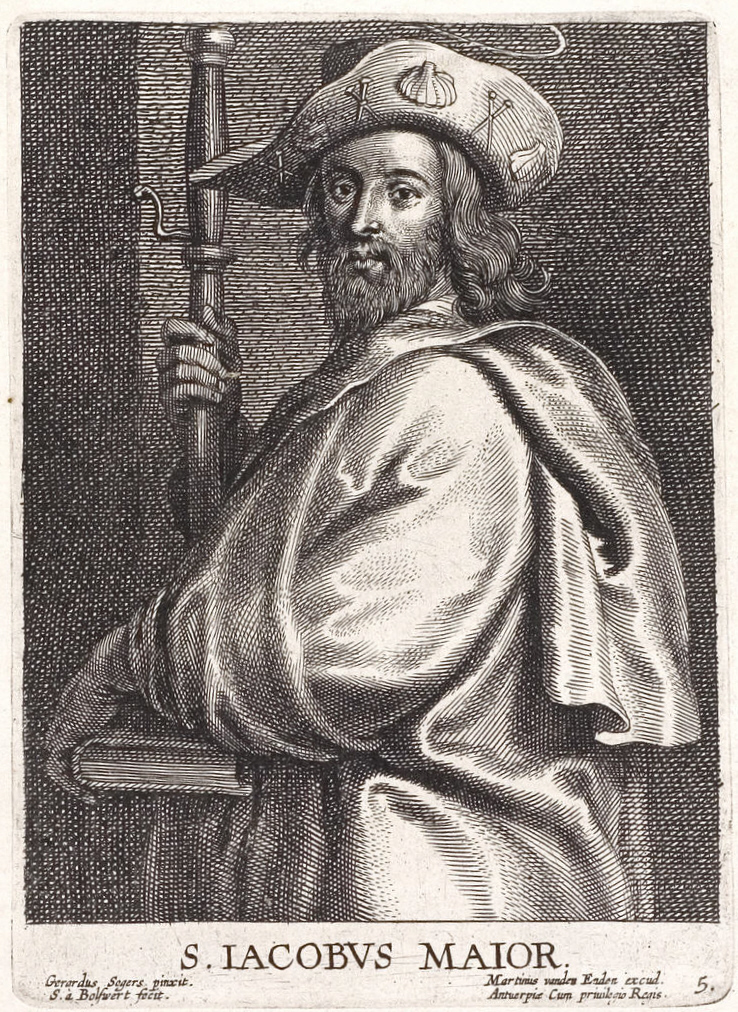
- Etching of Saint James
- Observed by: Catholic Church; Lutheran Churches; Church of England; Eastern Orthodox Church
- Type: National
- Date: July 25
- Frequency: Annual
- Related to: James the Great

The Feast of Saint James, also known as Saint James' Day, is a commemoration of the apostle James the Great celebrated on July 25 of the liturgical calendars of the Catholic Church and the Church of England. The Eastern Orthodox liturgical calendar commemorates James on April 30.

July 25 is also the National Day of Galicia of which James is its patron saint (Galician: Festas do Apóstolo).

== Legends and observances ==
According to the legends surrounding his life, it is said that James preached the gospel in Hispania as well as in the Holy Land. After his martyrdom at the hands of Herod Agrippa, his followers transported his body by sea to Galicia, where they landed at Iria Flavia, and then carried his remains to Santiago de Compostela for burial. The location of the grave was lost to memory, and was believed to be rediscovered by bishop Theodemir of Iria on July 25, 812, during the reign of Alfonso II.

Due to his purported role in leading a Christian victory in the mythical Battle of Clavijo as James Matamoros (James the Moor-slayer), James is held as patron saint of the Spaniards. Because of his role in northern Spain, James is venerated throughout the Basque Country and Galicia where July 25 is a public holiday.

A traditional pilgrimage called the Way of St James (Camino de Santiago) continuously brings people to the town of Santiago de Compostela and the Santiago de Compostela Cathedral. It is the town's largest annual festival, with processions and fireworks (Fogos do Apóstolo). The cathedral holds a special Mass, and its Botafumeiro may be swung. During a Jacobean Holy Year, pilgrims may enter the cathedral through the Holy Door (Porta Santa) to gain a plenary indulgence.

== Gallery ==
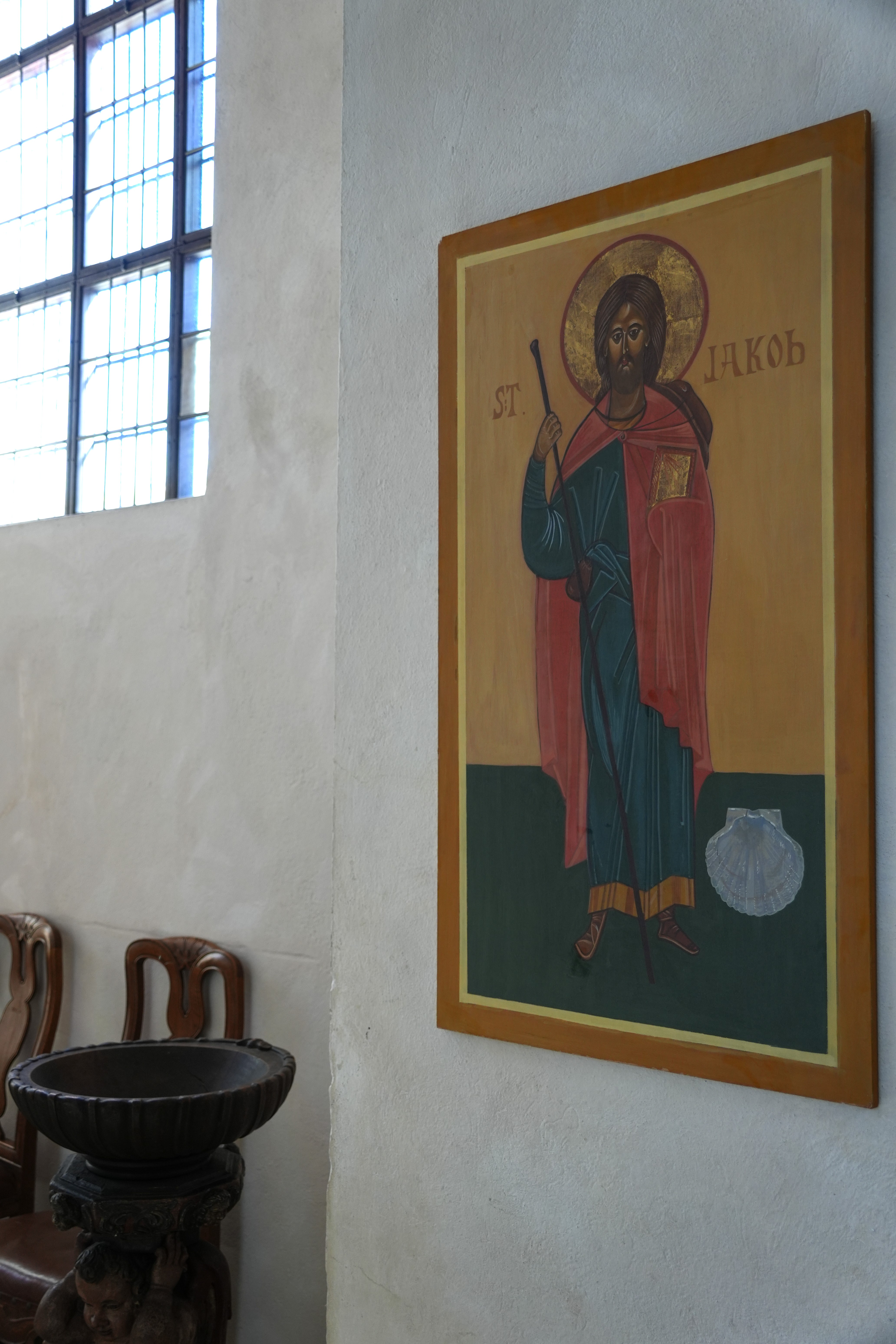
A holy water font next to an icon of Saint James the Great at Saint James's Church (Evangelical-Lutheran) in Stockholm

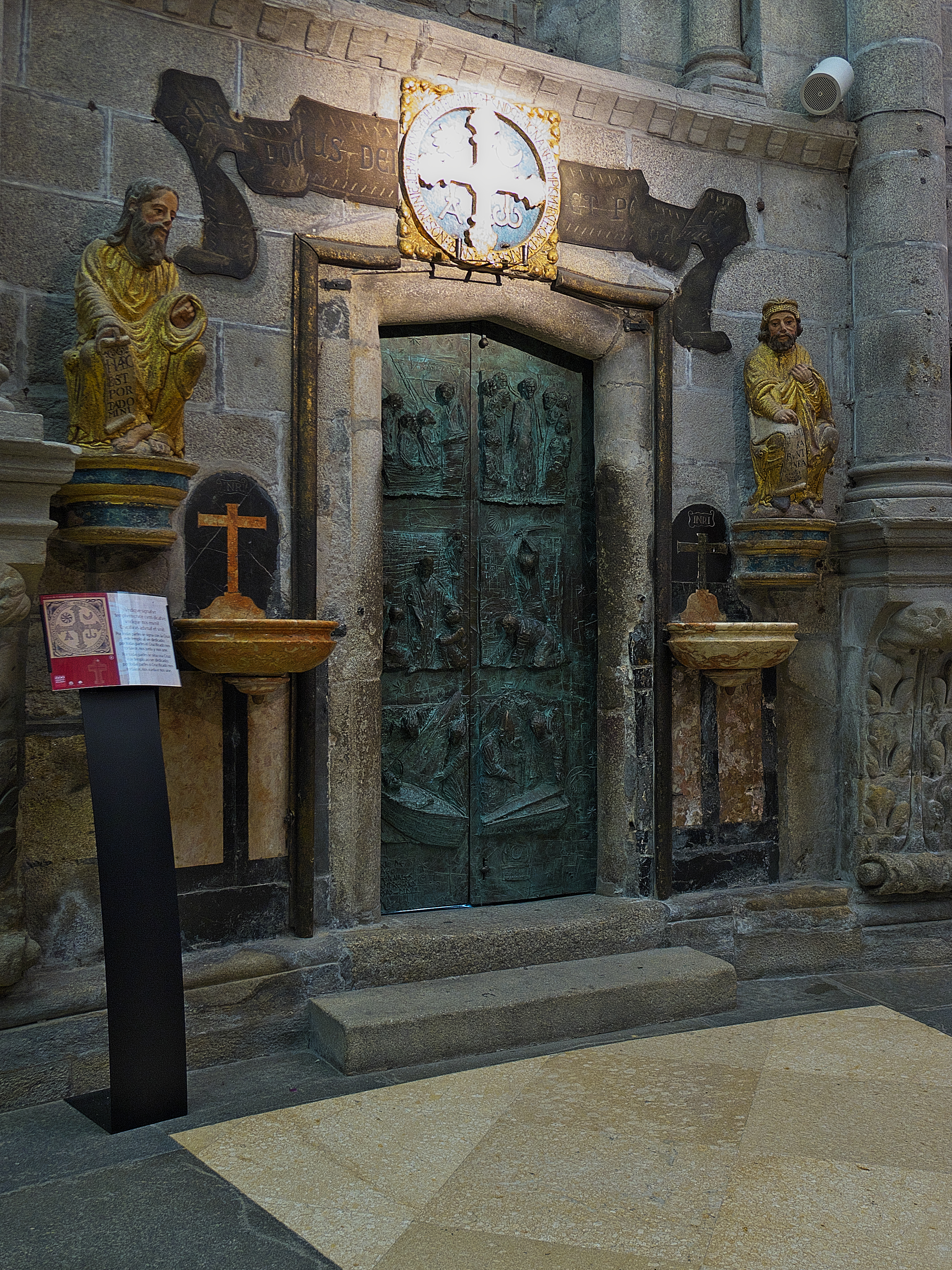
Pope Alexander III granted the privilege of a holy door to the Cathedral of Santiago de Compostela through his papal bull Regis Æterni on July 25, 1178.

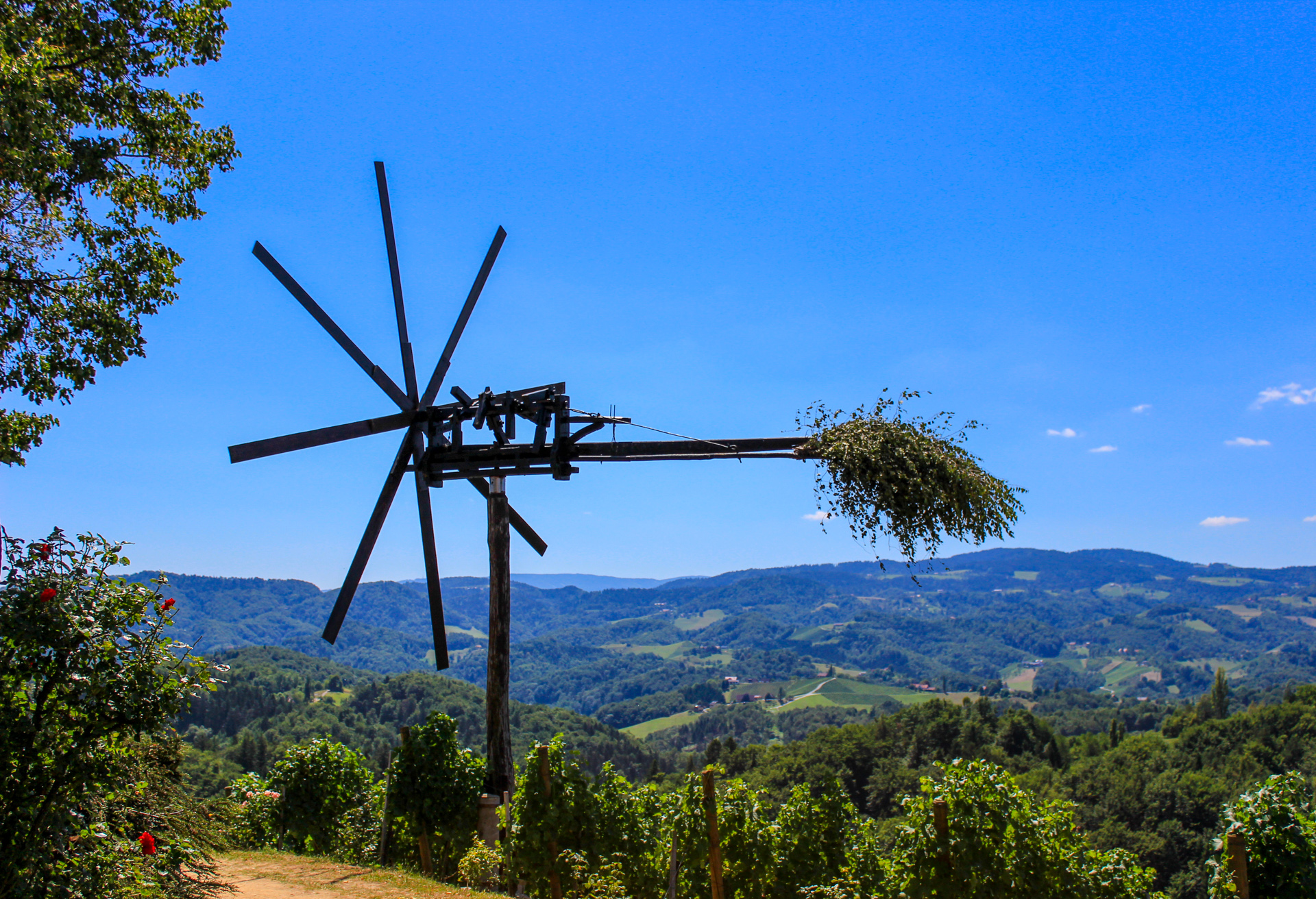
Klopotecs in Slovenia are traditionally set up on July 25.

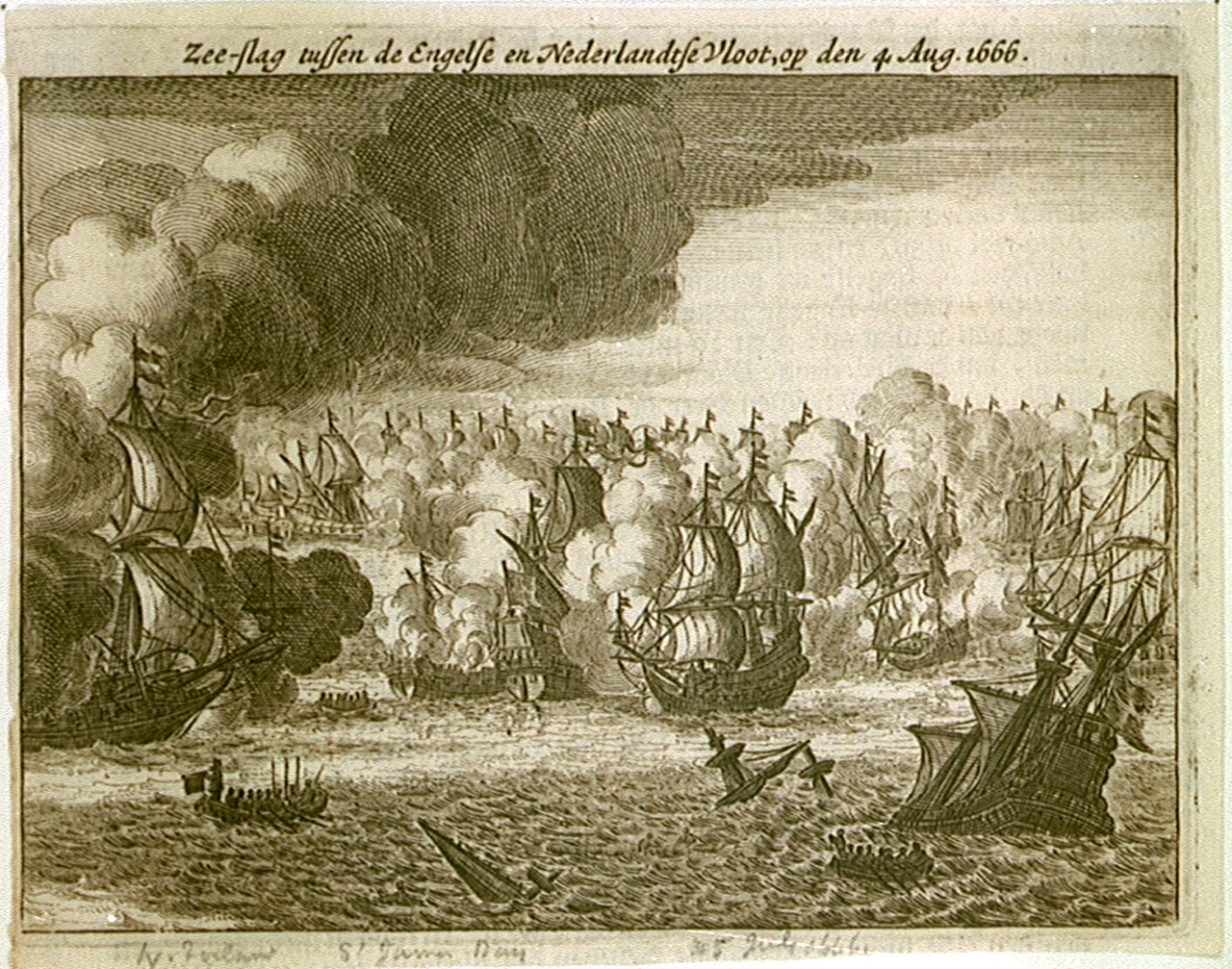
Engraving showing the St. James' Day Battle between English and Dutch ships

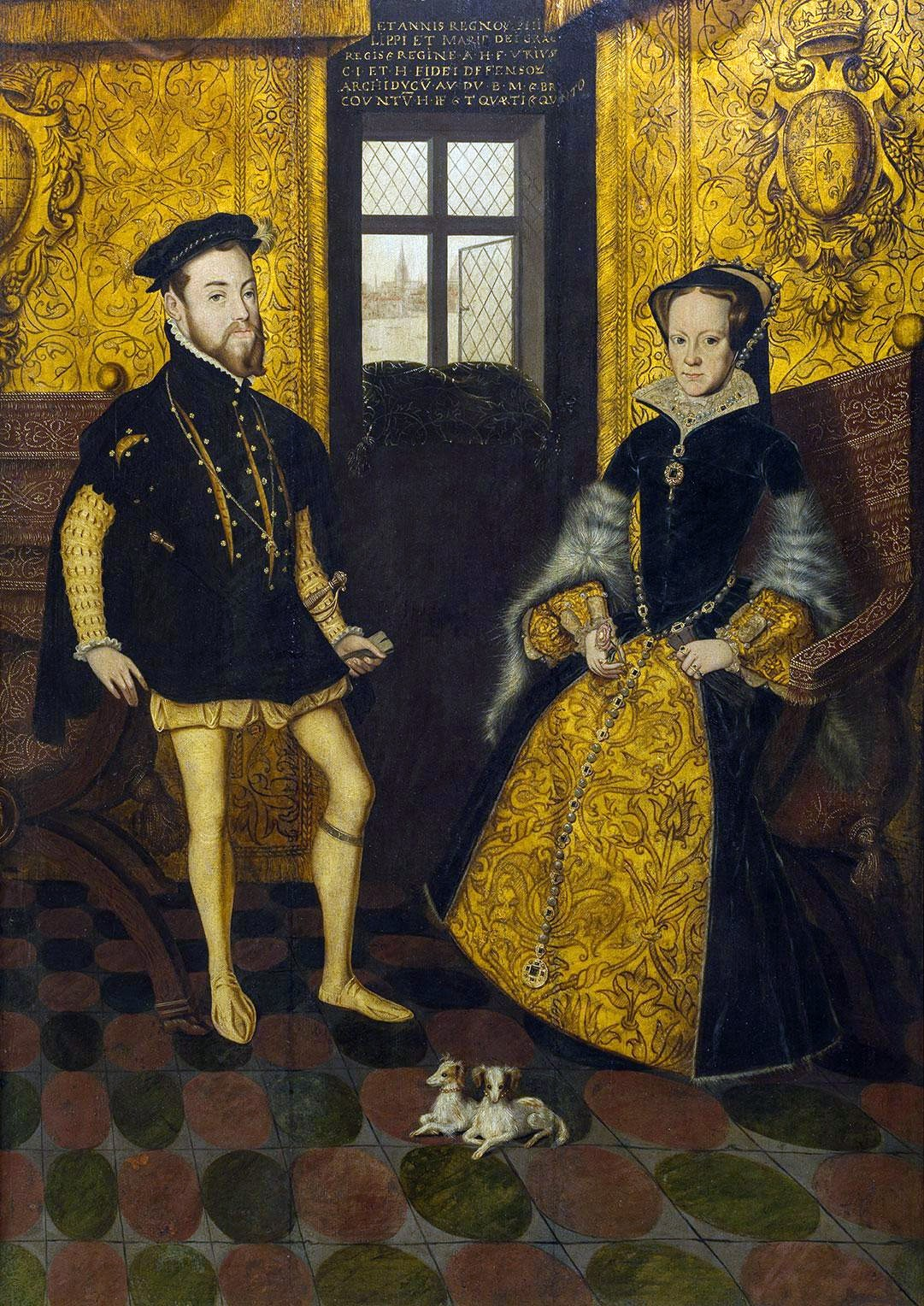
Mary I of England and Philip II of Spain married on July 25, 1554.

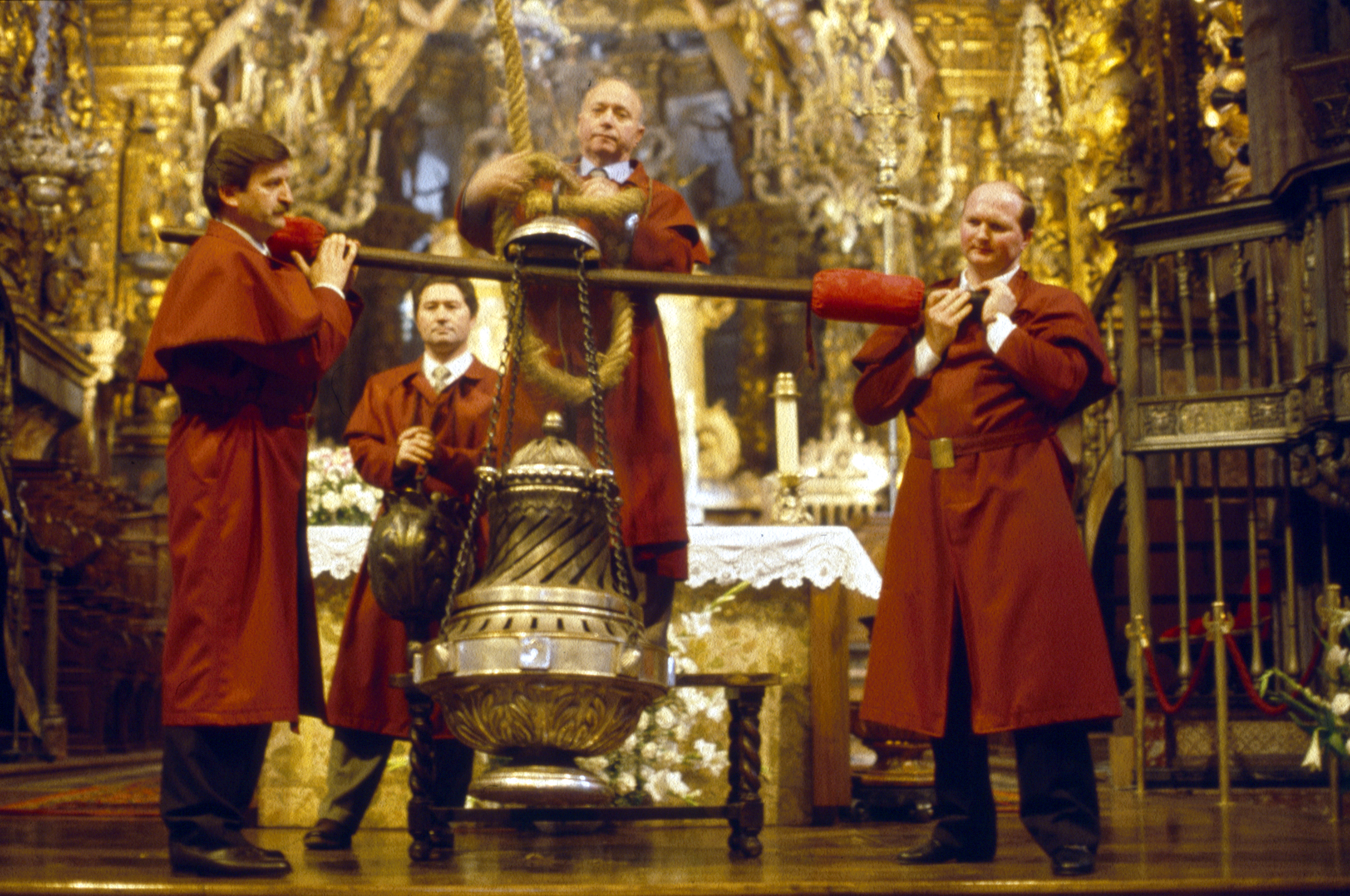
The Botafumeiro of the Santiago de Compostela Cathedral

== See also ==
- Liturgy of Saint James
- St. James' Day Battle
