= Convent of San Domingos de Bonaval =

Former monastery in Galicia, Spain

Coordinates: 42°52′57″N 8°32′20″W

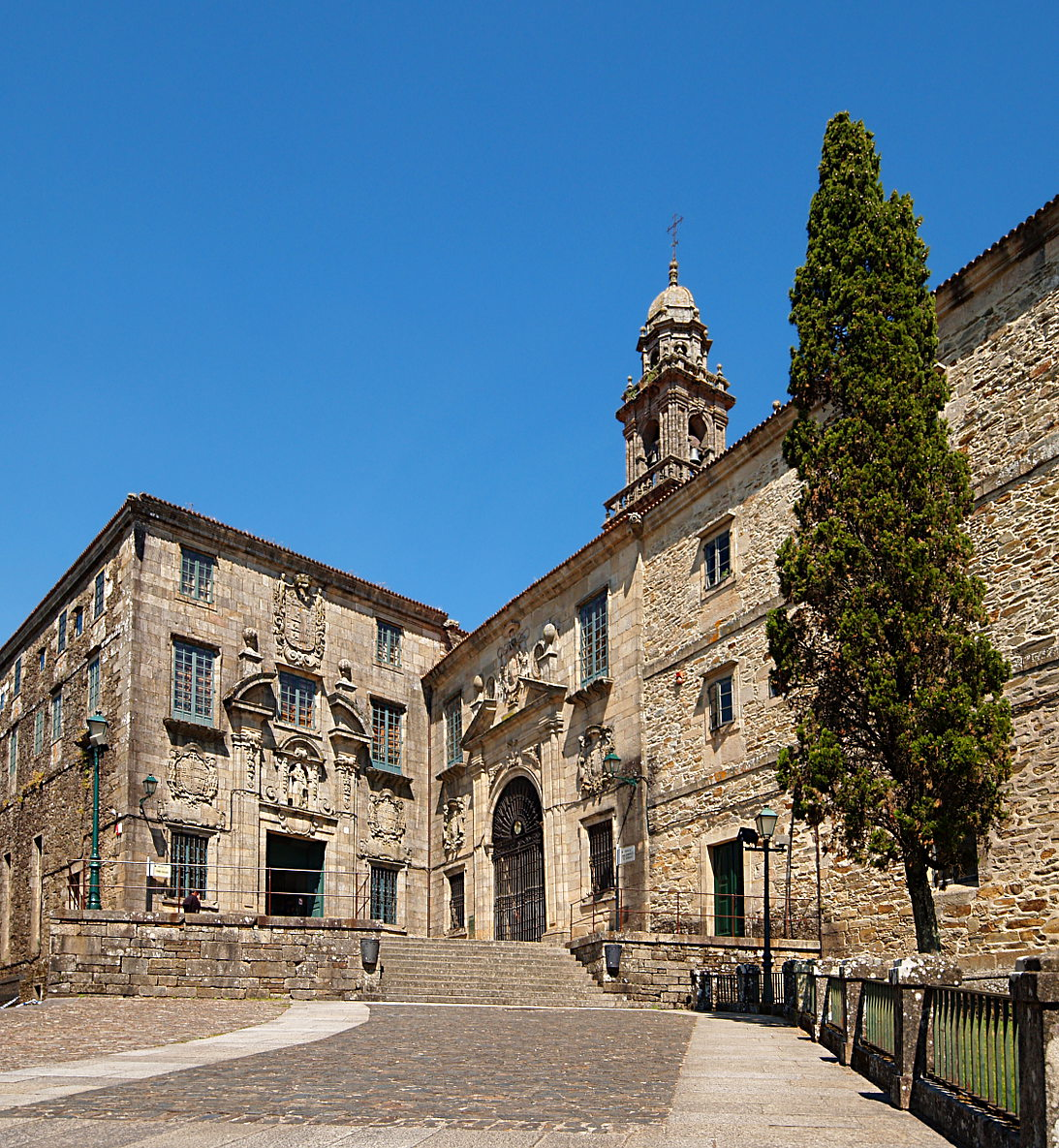
- Main facade of the convent (right) and the Museum of the Galician people (left)

Religion
- Patron: Saint Dominic
- Status: Museum and pantheon

Location
- Location: Santiago de Compostela, Galicia, Spain

Architecture
- Style: Gothic, Baroque, Neoclassical

The Convent of St Dominic (Galician: Convento de San Domingos de Bonaval; Castilian: Santo Domingo de Bonaval) is a former Dominican monastery in Santiago de Compostela, Galicia, Spain.

The complex includes architecture in various styles including work by the Galician Baroque architect Domingo de Andrade. It was declared a national monument in 1912.

== Situation ==
It is located in Santiago de Compostela, but outside the old walled city on the slopes of Mount Almáciga, near the place known as Porta do Camiño, which was one of the gates by which pilgrims entered the city.

== History ==
The convent was founded by St. Dominic de Guzman (who went on pilgrimage to Santiago in 1219) in the early thirteenth century. The oldest document which cites the convent, with the original name of Santa Maria, dates back to 1228. From the fifteenth century, it appears with the title of Santo Domingo, and under the patronage of the house of Altamira.

In 1695 starts the reconstruction of the convent, apparently due to the precarious situation of the building. Domingo de Andrade was in charge of the works under the patronage of Archbishop Antonio de Monroy. Thus, the current image of the convent is largely the result of the reforms ordered by this archbishop of Compostela, who held office between 1685 and 1715.

Like many Spanish monasteries, it was closed in the nineteenth century as part of the Ecclesiastical confiscations of Mendizábal.

== Description ==
=== Church ===
The church, built in Gothic and Renaissance style, is not currently open for worship. It houses the Pantheon of Illustrious Galicians and is a concert venue. It was built according to the canons of Gothic naves Dominican with light and airy, with the focus of services moved from the apse towards the pulpit located in the crossing. In this temple were buried the noble families of Moscoso and Castro, through the authorization of Pope Innocent IV, who gave the Dominican Order permission to bury lay people in their convents. The temple is completely covered with vaults.

=== Imagery ===
The altarpiece was built from 1687 by Domingo de Andrade in the parish church of Santiago de Carril, and after being mounted in its final position was not maintained the original structure. The base is clearly Renaissance, with overlapping bodies. The sculpture was commissioned toward 1689 by sculptor Stephen of Cendón, related to the style of Matthew de Prado . Represent San Francisco, San Augustine, San Benito, San Ignacio, San Pedro de Nolasco and Santo Domingo. Today's sculptures are scattered convent idle different places.

=== Pantheon of Illustrious Galicians ===
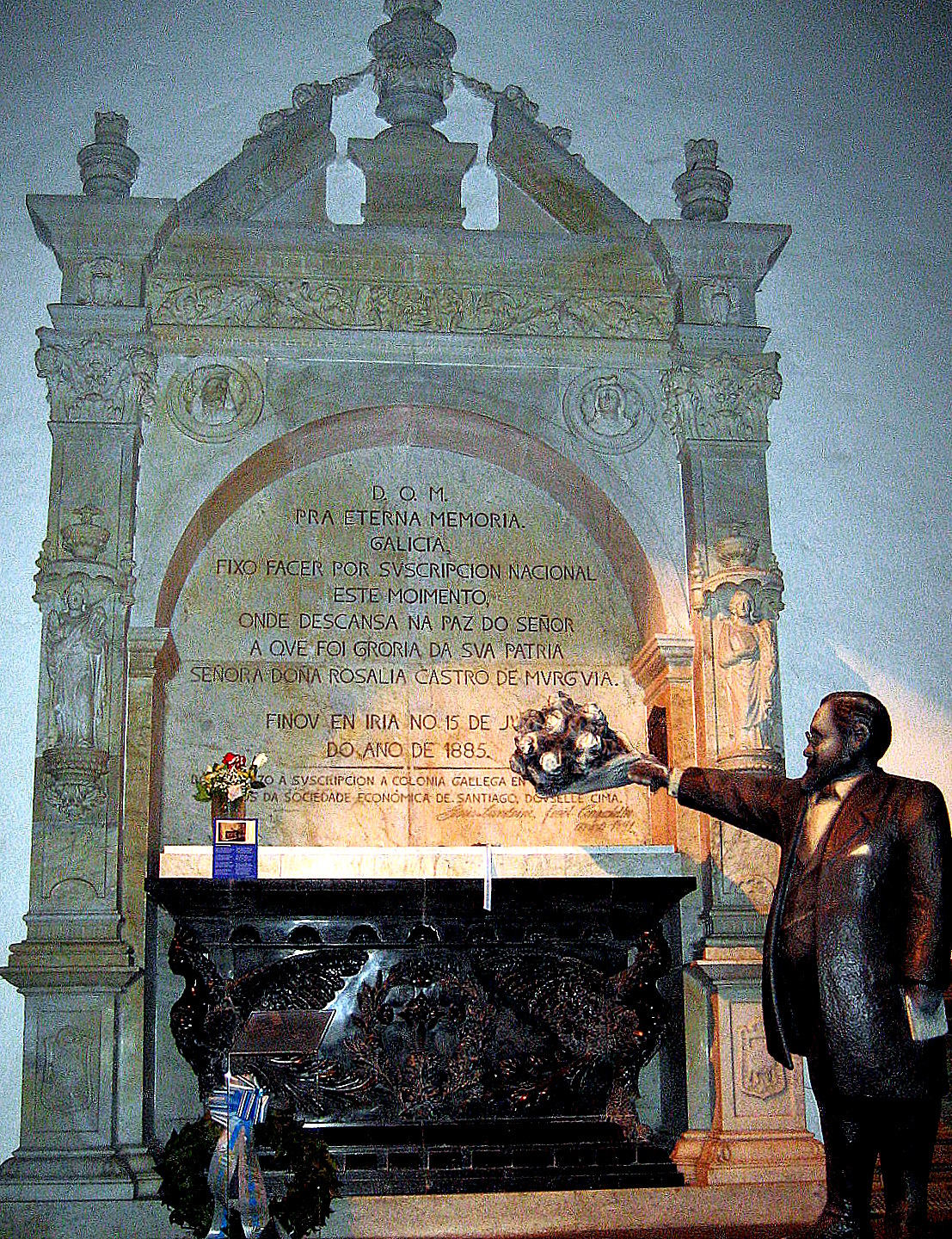
Tomb of the Galician poet Rosalia de Castro.

The monastery church in a side chapel houses the Pantheon of Illustrious Galicians, in Galician Panteón de Galegos Ilustres, where the remains of several key Galician cultural and political personalities such as writers: Rosalia de Castro, Alfredo Brañas, Ramón Cabanillas, the intellectual and cartographer Domingo Fontan, the sculptor Francisco Asorey, The last person buried in this mausoleum is the politician, writer and artist Alfonso Daniel Rodríguez Castelao, and considered the father of modern Galician identity, resting there since 1984.

=== The main facade ===
It is chaired by the coat of the Counts of Altamira with royal crown, patron of the convent, and in it are references to the work of the Art and Architecture of use Fray Lorenzo de San Nicolás . It is of small proportions, divided into three parts, horizontally and vertically. The cover consists of two beams Tuscan pilasters decorated with typical fruit Andrade's work, supporting a curved pediment framing the door lintel party, chaired by the image of Santo Domingo. On both sides of the rectangular openings open door. On the lintels, in brackets, you can still read clearly an inscription commemorating Archbishop Monroy's commissioning of the work. (Note: Esa portada i quarto que le sigue mando hacer el ylustrissimo sr don frai Antonio de Monroi arzobispo i señor de esta ciudad i genera de esta sagrada religión con las himagines i dorado año de 1699.)

=== The triple helical staircase ===
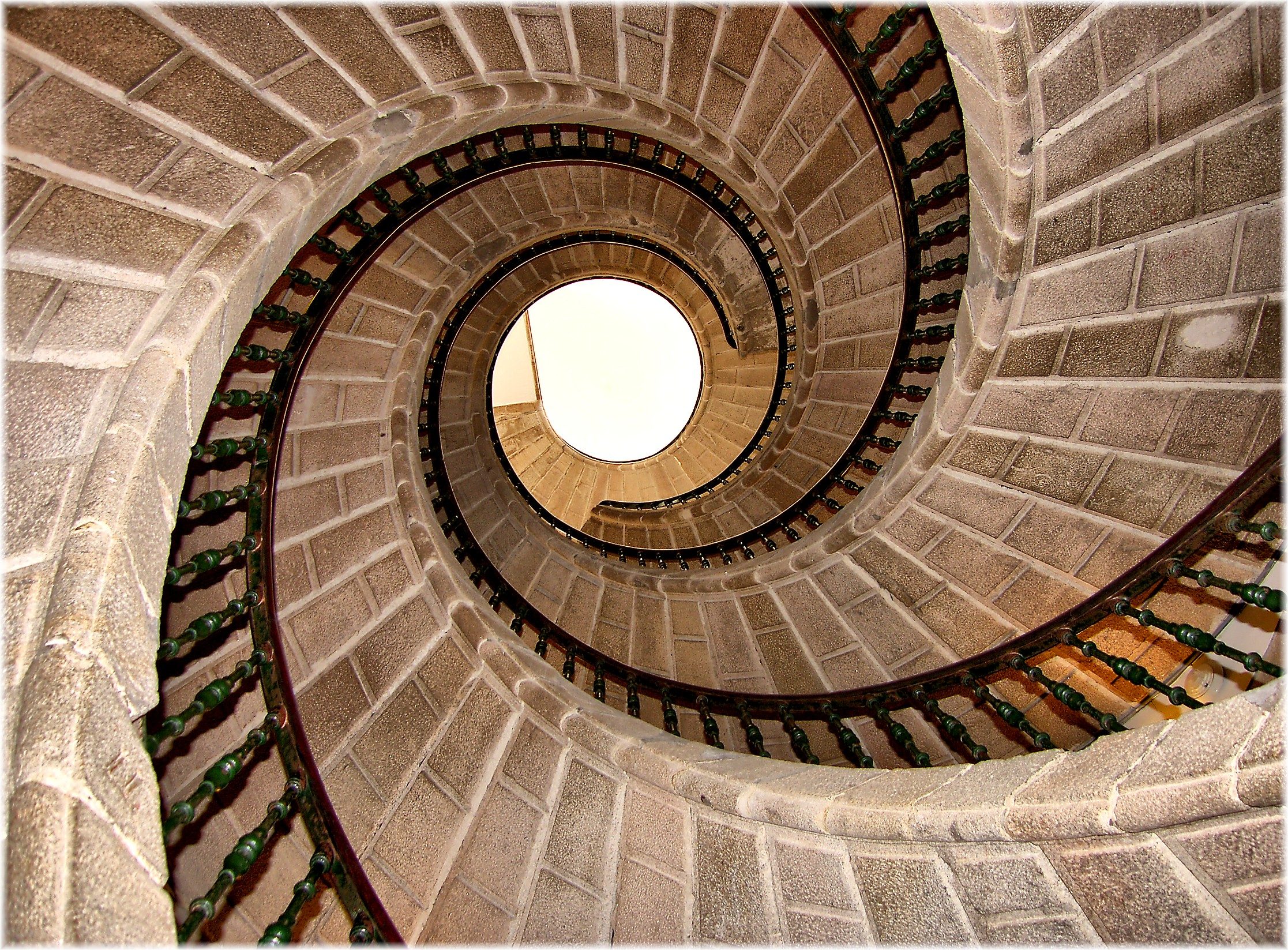
Staircase

Inside the convent stands the extraordinary triple helical staircase of the seventeenth and eighteenth centuries, the work also the architect Domingo de Andrade. It consists of three separate coils. Professor Rios Miramontes related it to that found in the Castle of Chambord, in France. In the same space extend three separate ramps that lead to different rooms, only one of them comes to the viewpoint. The rungs of the ladder are made of a whole piece, set in an outer rib fit without joining the wall or each other. It was restored by Xosé Cerviño Garcia, Master Cerviño.

=== The tower ===
Also by Domingo de Andrade, under the patronage of Monroy, structured essentially following the work of the same architect in the Clock Tower in the Cathedral of Santiago de Compostela, performing in the early eighteenth century.

== Current Situation ==
The Museo do Pobo Galego and an urban park are within its facilities, and is beside the CGAC (Centro Galego de Arte Contemporanea, the Galicia Contemporary Art Centre).
