= Domingo de Andrade =

Galician baroque architect

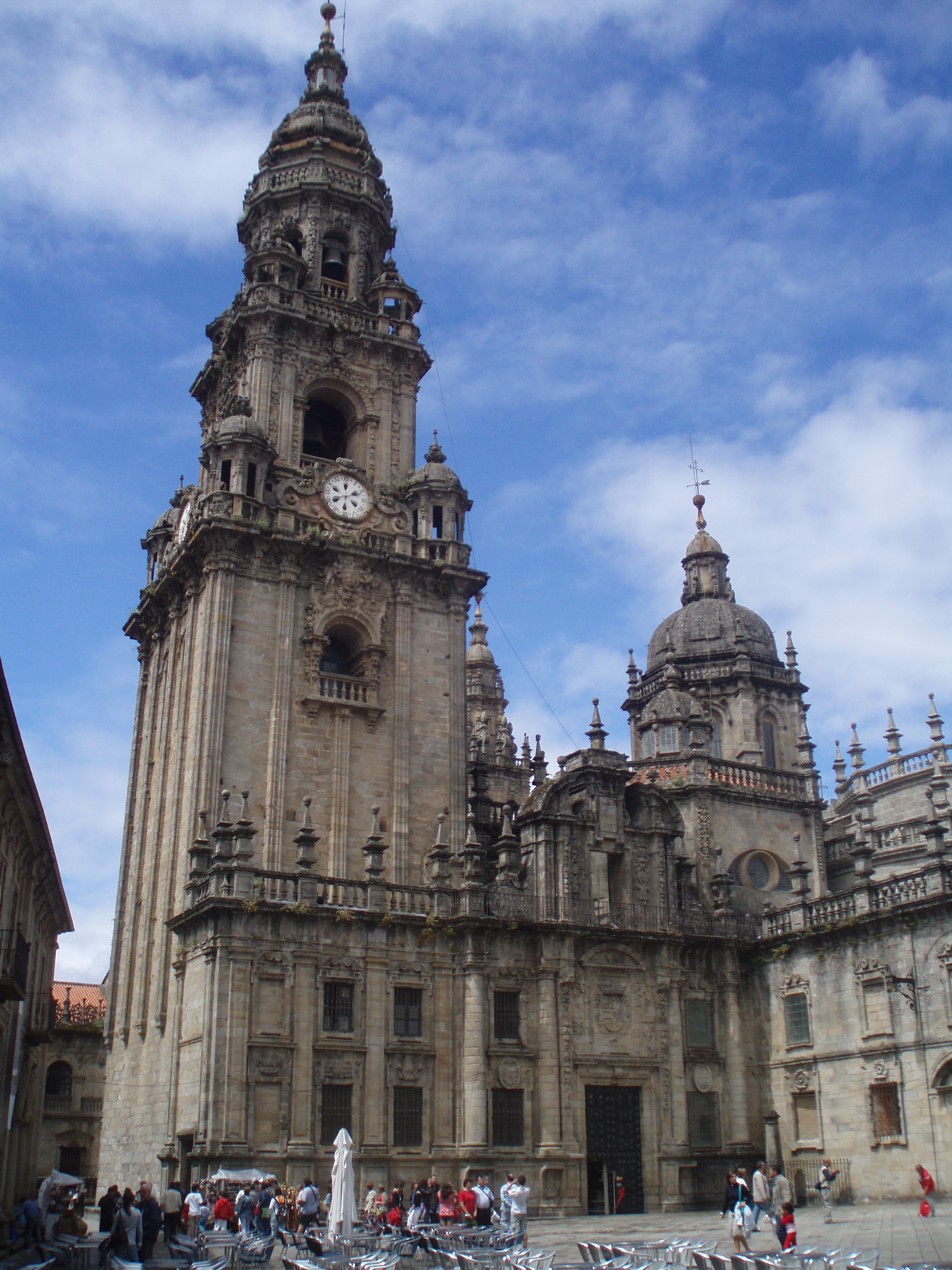
- Clock Tower and Royal Door; Cathedral of Santiago de Compostela
- Born: Domingo Antonio de Andrade; 1639; Cee, Province of A Coruña
- Died: 1712 (aged 72–73); Santiago de Compostela
- Known for: Architecture
- Movement: Baroque

Domingo Antonio de Andrade (1639 in Cee – 1712 in Santiago de Compostela) was a Galician baroque architect, a leading figure in the emergence of Galician Baroque architecture.

== Works ==
In the Cathedral of Santiago de Compostela where, in 1671, he was designated as “Master builder” (architect):

- Cathedral of Santiago de Compostela Clock tower, called Berenguela (1676-1680).
- Royal Door to Quintana square, initiated by Jose de la Peña de Toro.
- Finished the Tower of the Bells, initiated by Peña de Toro.
- Finished the baldachin designed by Jose de Vega y Verdugo, Count of Alba Real and canon of the cathedral chapter.
- New sacristy, now capela do Pilar, finished by Fernando de Casas Novoa.

Other works in Santiago de Compostela:

- Convent of Saint Dominic of Bonaval: The triple helical staircase, the tower and the finished cloister.
- Several historic houses: “Casa das Pomas” (initiated by Diego de Romay), "Casa da Parra" in Quintana Square, or the "Casa da Conga."
- Retables for the Convent of Saint Dominic of Bonaval and the Convent of Saint Clare.

== Bibliography ==
- Toman Borngässer, Rolf (1998). The Baroque, Architecture, Sculpture, Painting. Konemman. ISBN 978-3895089176.
