= Santiago de Compostela Cathedral =

Catholic cathedral in Galicia, Spain

Metropolitan Archcathedral Basilica of Santiago de Compostela
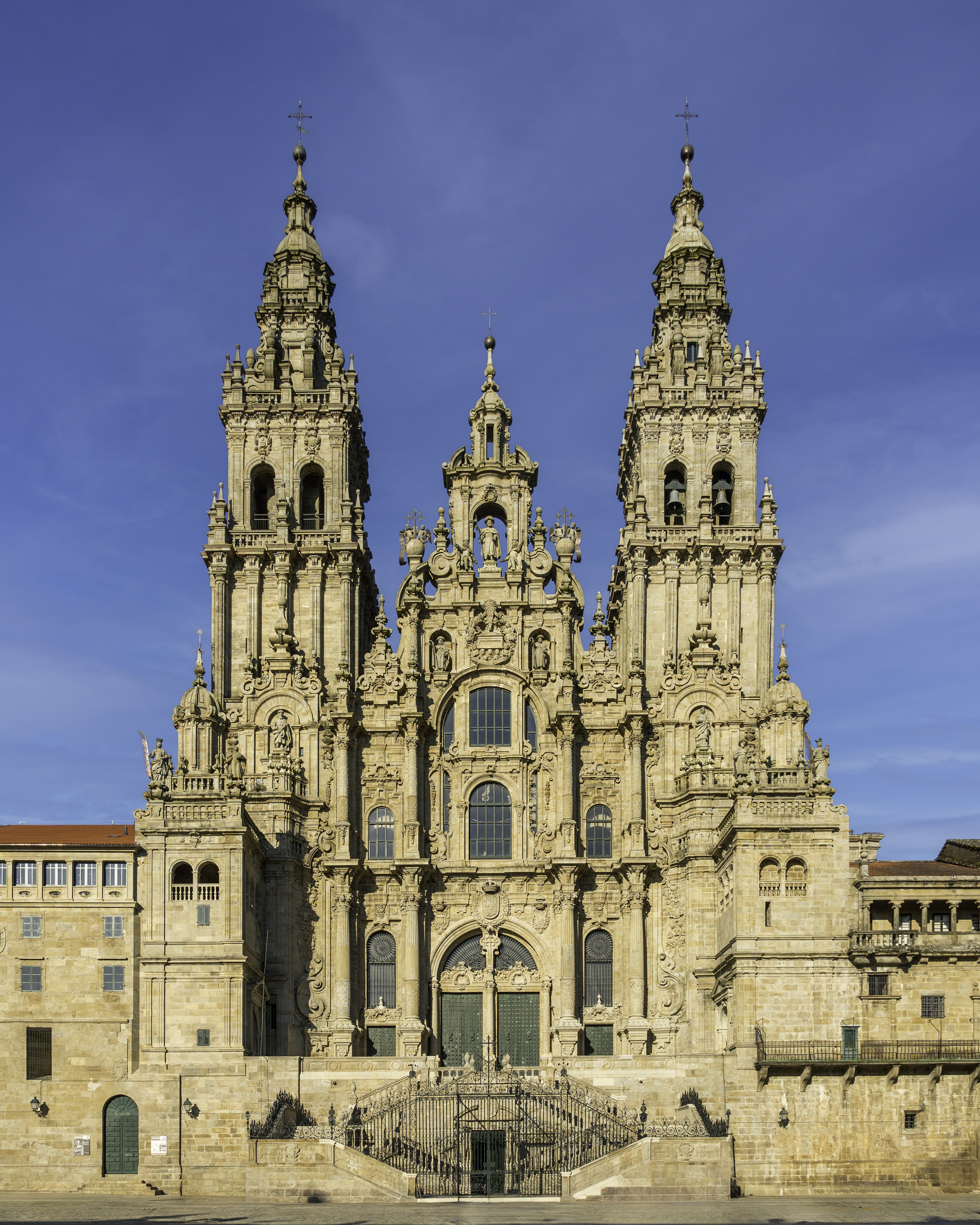
- The western façade of the Metropolitan Archcathedral Basilica as seen from the Praza do Obradoiro

- Location within Spain Location within Galicia

Religion
- Affiliation: Catholic
- Diocese: Santiago de Compostela
- Rite: Roman Rite
- Leadership: Archbishop Francisco José Prieto Fernández

Location
- Location: Santiago de Compostela, Galicia, Spain
- Interactive map of Metropolitan Archcathedral Basilica of Santiago de Compostela
- Coordinates: 42°52′50″N 08°32′40″W

Architecture
- Type: Metropolitan Archcathedral-Basilica
- Style: Romanesque, Gothic, Baroque
- Groundbreaking: 1075
- Completed: 1211

Specifications
- Direction of façade: West
- Capacity: 1,200
- Length: 100 m (330 ft)
- Width: 70 m (230 ft)
- Height (max): 75 m (246 ft)
- Spire: 2
- UNESCO World Heritage Site
- Official name: Santiago de Compostela (Old Town)
- Criteria: i, ii, vi
- Designated: 1985
- Reference no.: 320bis
- Spanish Cultural Heritage
- Official name: Catedral Igrexa Catedral Metropolitana
- Designated: 22 August 1896
- Reference no.: (R.I.) - 51 - 0000072 - 00000

Website
- catedraldesantiago.es

The Santiago de Compostela Archcathedral Basilica (Spanish and Galician: Catedral Basílica de Santiago de Compostela) is part of the Metropolitan Archdiocese of Santiago de Compostela and is an integral component of the Santiago de Compostela World Heritage Site in Galicia, Spain. The cathedral is the reputed burial place of Saint James the Great, one of the apostles of Jesus Christ. It is also among the remaining churches in the world built over the tomb of an apostle, the other ones being St Peter's Basilica in Vatican City, St Thomas Cathedral Basilica in Chennai, India, and Basilica of St. John in İzmir, Turkey.

The archcathedral basilica has historically been a place of Christian pilgrimage on the Way of St James since the Early Middle Ages and marks the traditional end of the pilgrimage route. The building is a Romanesque structure, with later Gothic and Baroque additions.

== History ==
According to legend, the tomb in Santiago was rediscovered in AD 814 by Pelagius the Hermit, after he witnessed strange lights in the night sky above the Libredon forest. Bishop Theodomirus of Iria recognized this as a miracle and informed king Alfonso II of Asturias and Galicia (791–842). The king ordered the construction of a chapel on the site. Legend has it that the king was the first pilgrim to this shrine. This was followed by the first church in AD 829 and then in AD 899 by a pre-Romanesque church, ordered by king Alfonso III of León, which caused the gradual development of this major place of pilgrimage.

In 997 the early church was reduced to ashes by Al-Mansur Ibn Abi Aamir (938–1002), army commander of the caliph of Córdoba. St James's tomb and relics were left undisturbed. The gates and the bells, carried by local Christian captives to Córdoba, were added to the Aljama Mosque. When Córdoba was taken by king Ferdinand III of Castile in 1236, these same gates and bells were then transported by Muslim captives to Toledo, to be inserted in the Cathedral of Saint Mary of Toledo.

Construction of the present cathedral began in 1075 under the reign of Alfonso VI of Castile (1040–1109) and the patronage of bishop Diego Peláez. It was built according to the same plan as the monastic brick church of Saint Sernin in Toulouse, probably the greatest Romanesque edifice in France. It was built mostly in granite. Construction was halted several times and, according to the Liber Sancti Iacobi, the last stone was laid in 1122. But by then, the construction of the cathedral was certainly not finished. The cathedral was consecrated in 1211 in the presence of king Alfonso IX of Leon.

According to the Codex Calixtinus the architects were "Bernard the elder, a wonderful master", his assistants Robertus Galperinus and, later possibly, "Esteban, master of the cathedral works". In the last stage "Bernard, the younger" was finishing the building, while Galperinus was in charge of the coordination. He also constructed a monumental fountain in front of the north portal in 1122.

The city became an episcopal see in 1075 and the church its cathedral. Due to its growing importance as a place of pilgrimage, it was raised to an archiepiscopal see by Pope Callixtus II in 1120. A university was added in 1495.

It has been proposed that the peculiar lantern towers of several churches in the Duero valley (Zamora, Plasencia, Toro, Évora) were inspired by the Romanesque dome of Santiago, substituted by a Gothic one in the 15th century. The cathedral was expanded and embellished with additions in the 16th, 17th and 18th centuries.

== Exterior of the cathedral ==
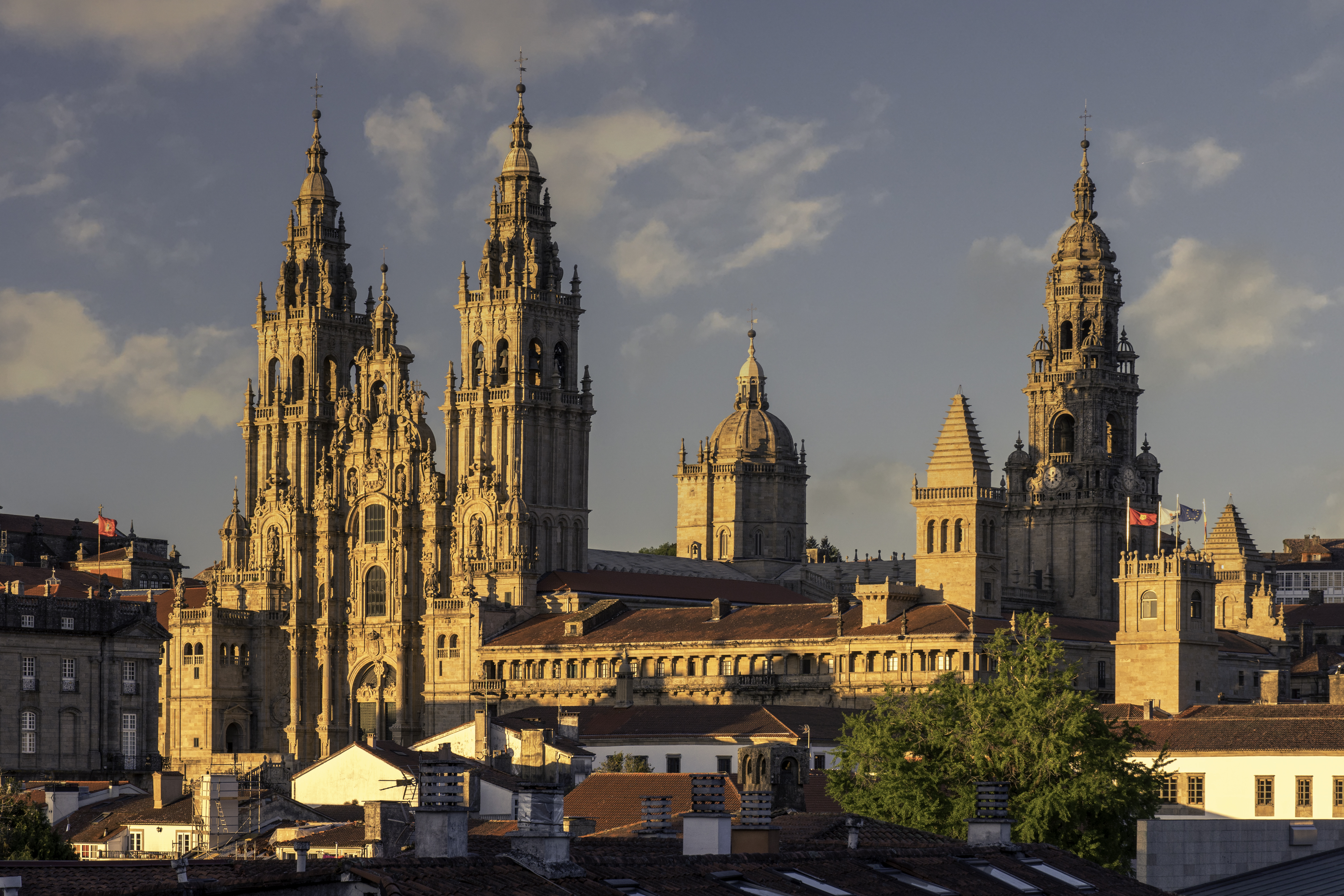
Overview of the cathedral complex

Each of the façades along with their adjoining squares constitute a large urban square. The Baroque façade of the Praza do Obradoiro square was completed by Fernando de Casas Novoa in 1740. Also in baroque style is the Acibecharía façade by Ferro Caaveiro and Fernández Sarela, later modified by Ventura Rodríguez. The Pratarías façade, built by the Master Esteban in 1103, and most importantly the Pórtico da Gloria, an early work of Romanesque sculpture, were completed by Master Mateo in 1188.

=== Façade of the Obradoiro ===
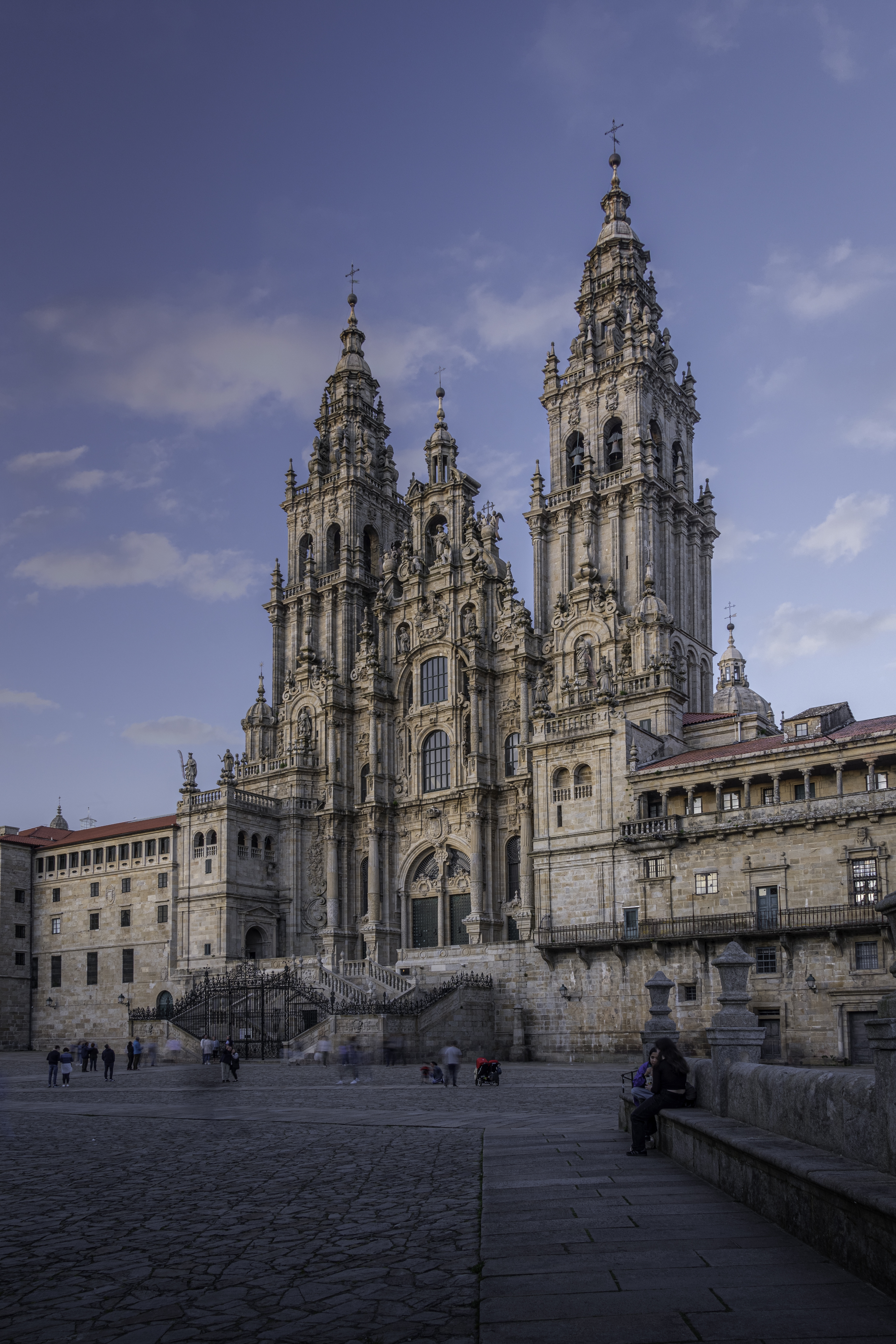
The façade at dusk

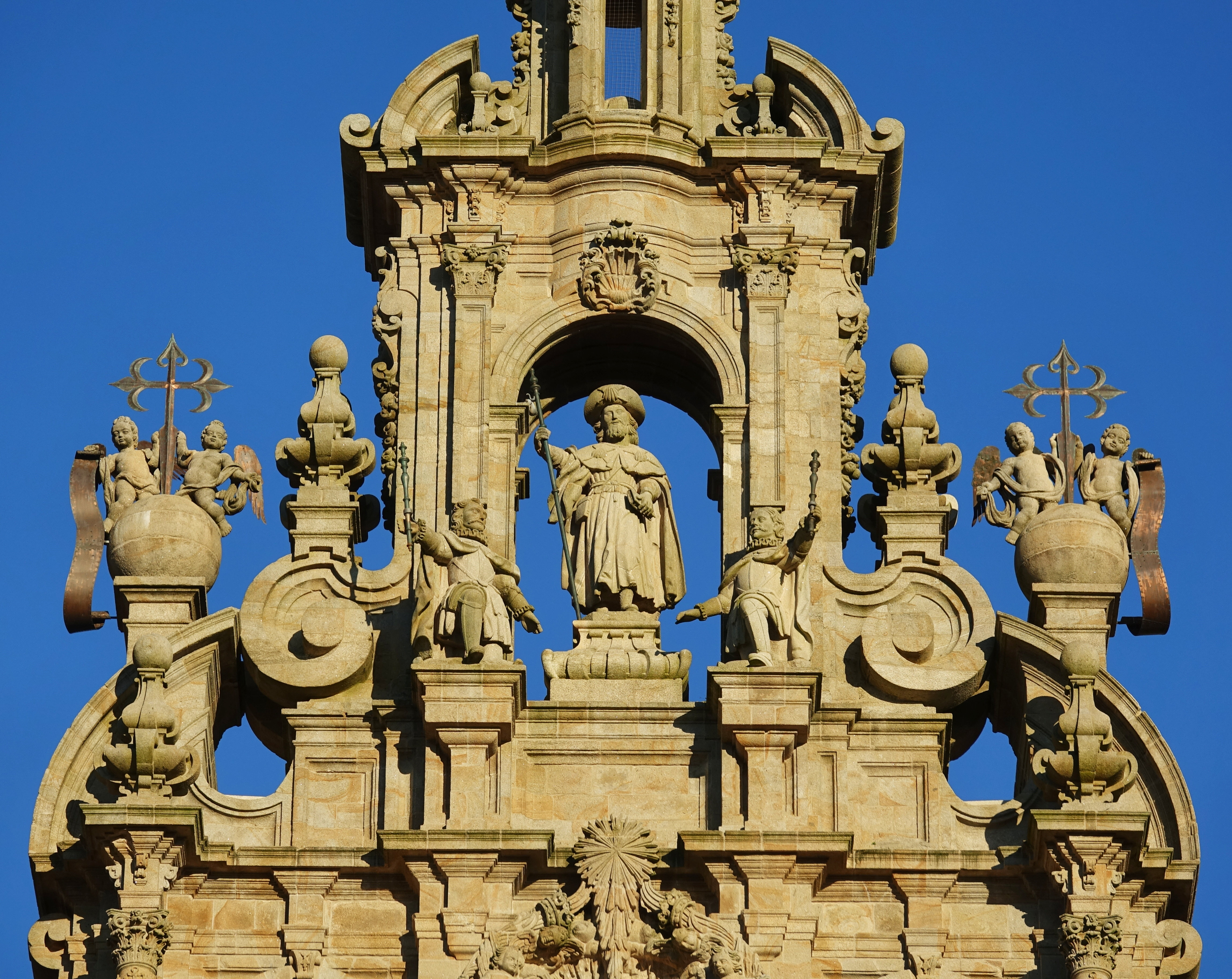
Saint James dressed as a pilgrim on the façade

The Obradoiro square in front of the façade alludes to the workshop (Galician: obradoiro) of stonemasons who worked on the square during the construction of the cathedral. In order to protect the Pórtico da Gloria from deterioration caused by weather, this façade and towers have had several reforms since the 16th century. In the 18th century it was decided to build the current Baroque façade, designed by Fernando de Casas Novoa. It has large glazed windows that illuminate the ancient Romanesque façade, located between the towers of the Bells and of the Ratchet. In the middle of the central body is St. James and one level below his two disciples Athanasius and Theodore, all dressed as pilgrims. In between, the urn (representing the found tomb) and the star (representing the lights Hermit Pelagius saw) between angels and clouds. The tower on the right depicts Mary Salome, mother of St. James, and the tower on the left depicts his father Zebedee. The balustrade on the left side depicts St. Susanna and St. John and the one on the right depicts St. Barbara and James the Less.

The Maximilian Staircase allows entrance to the façade. The stair was made in the 17th century by Ginés Martínez and it is of Renaissance style inspired by Giacomo Vignola of Palazzo Farnese. It is diamond-shaped with two ramps that surround the entrance to the old 12th century Romanesque crypt of the Master Mateo, popularly called the "Old Cathedral". According to Manuel Gago Mariño, the sculptures at the base of the Maximilian Staircase of the cathedral, built by Maximilian of Austria are also related to the Battle of Clavijo.

Between the existing plane of the façade of the Obradoiro and the old Romanesque portal (Pórtico da Gloria) there is a covered narthex.

This façade has become a symbol of the cathedral and the city of Santiago de Compostela. As such, it is the engraving on the back of the Spanish euro coins of 1, 2 and 5 cents.

=== South façade or das Pratarías ===
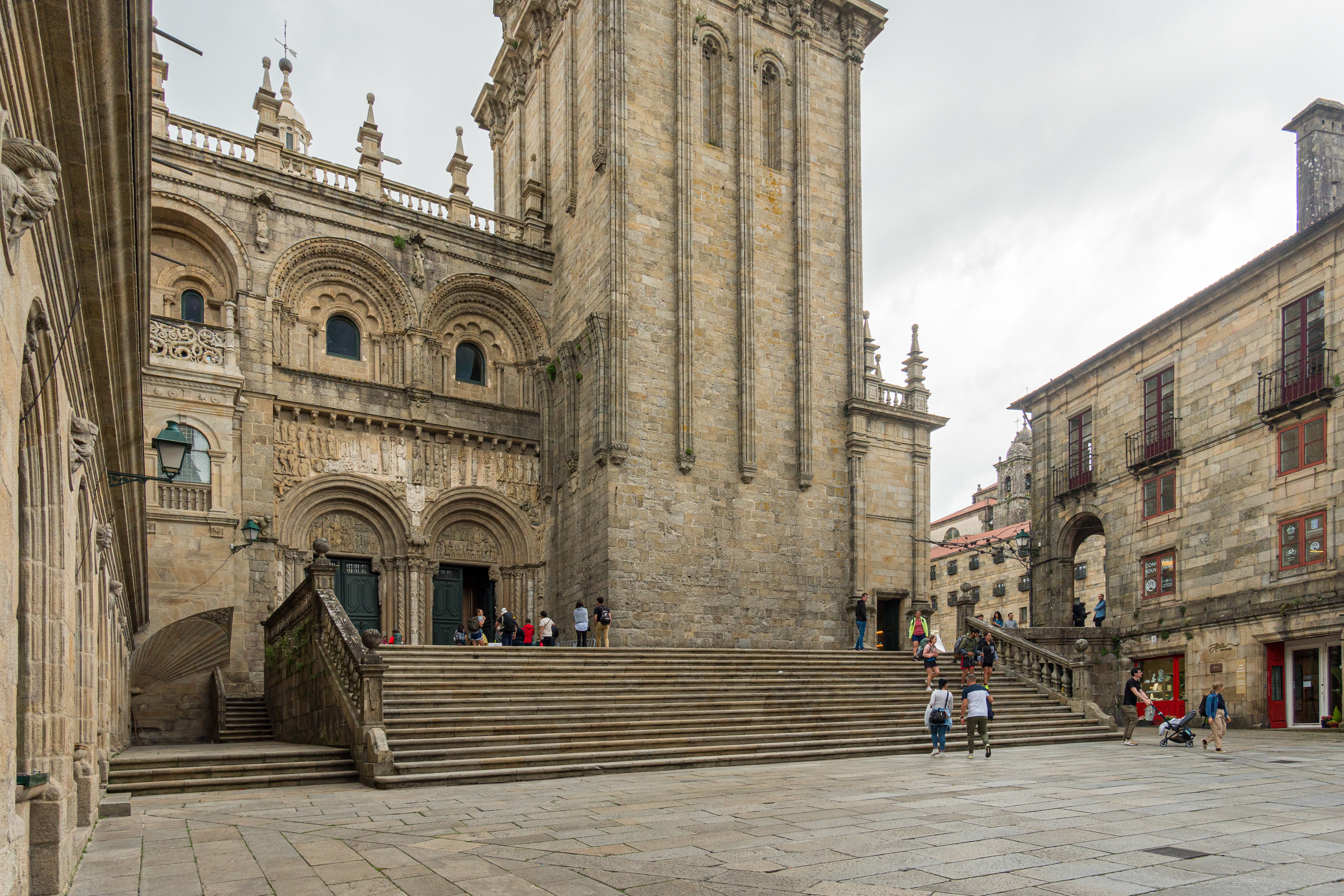
The Romanesque façade das Pratarías, which bears traces of the second church, built between 1103 and 1117

The façade of the Silverware (Pratarías in Galician) is the southern façade of the transept of the cathedral of Santiago de Compostela; it is the only Romanesque façade that is preserved in the cathedral. It was built between 1103 and 1117 and elements from other parts of the cathedral have been added in subsequent years. The square is bound by the cathedral and cloister on two sides. Next to the cathedral is the Casa do Cabido.

It has two entrance doors in degradation with archivolts and historical tympanums. The archivolts are attached over eleven columns, three are of white marble (middle and corners) and the rest of granite. In the center are the figures of twelve prophets and the Apostles on the sideline. On the tympanums is a large frieze separated from the upper body by a strip supported by grotesque corbels; on this floor are two windows decorated with Romanesque archivolts.

In the central frieze is Christ, with various characters and scenes. On the right six figures belong to the Stone choir of Master Mateo that were placed in the late 19th century. The original provision of the iconographic elements was invalidated since in the 18th century numerous images were introduced recovered from the dismantled Acibecharía façade. A central medallion shows the Eternal Father (or Transfiguration) with open hands and on the top surface there are four angels with trumpets heralding the Final Judgment.

In the tympanum of the left door is Christ tempted by a group of demons. To the right is a half-dressed woman with a skull in her hands, which could be Eve or the adulterous woman. This figure is not praying on her knees but is sitting on two lions. The jambs are Saint Andrew and Moses. In the left abutment, the Biblical King David seated on his throne with his legs crossed, translucent through the thin fabric of his clothes, and playing what appears to be a rebec, personifies the triumph over evil and is an outstanding Romanesque work, sculpted by Master Esteban. The creation of Adam and Christ's blessing is also shown. Many of these figures come from the Romanesque façade of the north or do Paraíso (current façade of the Acibecharía) and were placed on this façade in the 18th century.

In the tympanum of the right door there are several scenes from the Passion of Christ and the Adoration of the Magi. In one of the jambs is the inscription commemorating the laying of the stone:

ERA / IC / XVI / V IDUS / JULLII

Registration follows the Roman calendar, according to the computation of the Spanish era, corresponding to July 11, 1078. An image, unidentified, of a fox eating a rabbit and, against this, a badly dressed woman with an animal in her lap. Supported on the wall of the tower Berenguela appear other images representing the creation of Eve, Christ on a throne, and the Binding of Isaac.

=== North façade or da Acibecharía ===
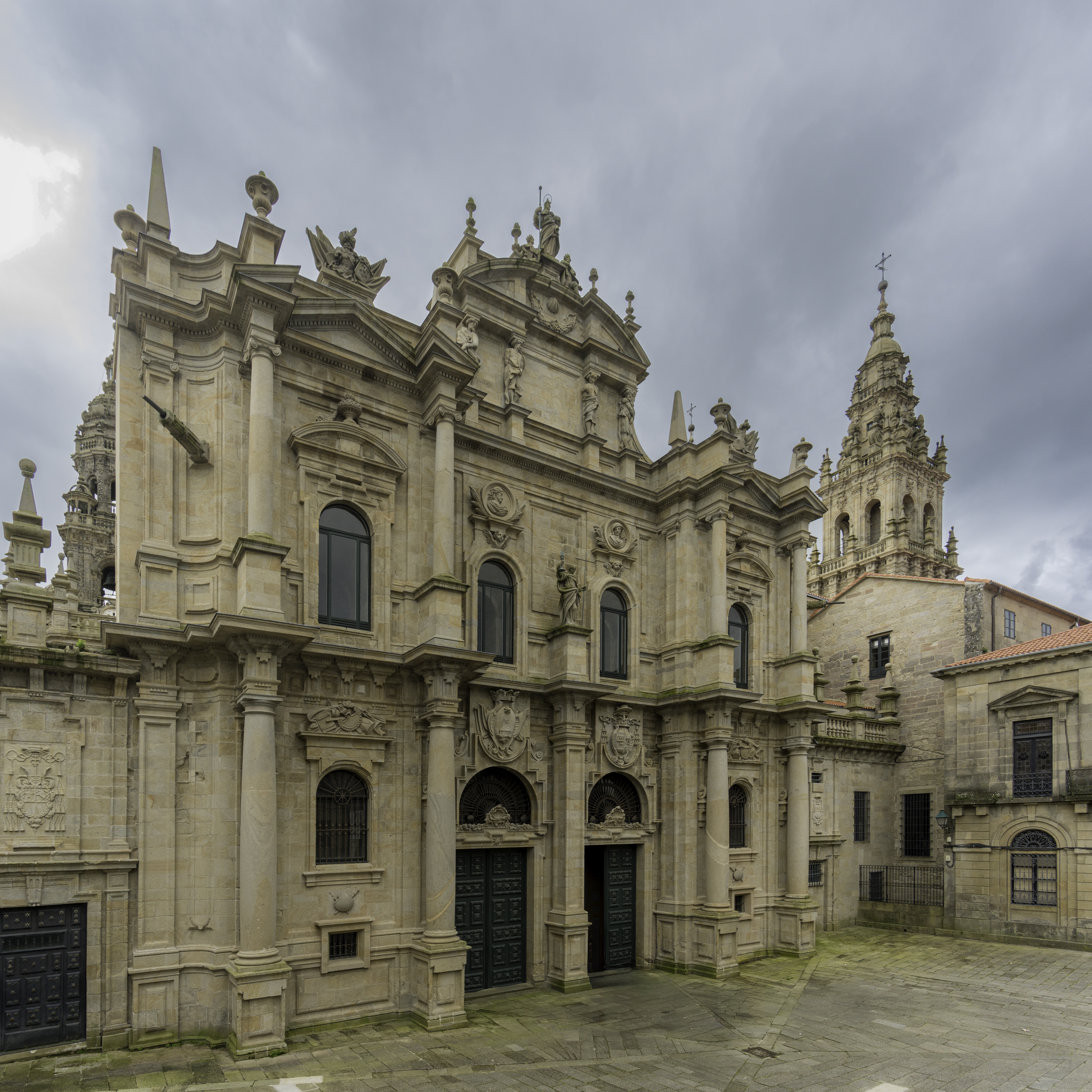
Façade da Acibecharía

The façade "da Acibecharía" (Galician name derived from the jet gemstone) is in the Praza da Inmaculada or Acibecharía, draining the last section of urban roads: French, Primitive, Northern and English through the old gate Franxígena or Paradise door. The Romanesque portal was built in 1122 by Bernardo, treasurer of the temple. This portal was demolished after suffering a fire in 1758; some sculptural pieces that were saved were placed on the façade das Pratarías. The new façade was designed in Baroque style by Lucas Ferro Caaveiro and finished by Domingo Lois Monteagudo and Clemente Fernández Sarela in the neoclassical style in 1769, although it retained some traces of the baroque.

At the top of the façade is an 18th-century statue of St. James, with two kings in prayer at his feet: Alfonso III of Asturias and Ordoño II of León. In the centre is the statue of Faith.

=== East façade or da Quintana ===
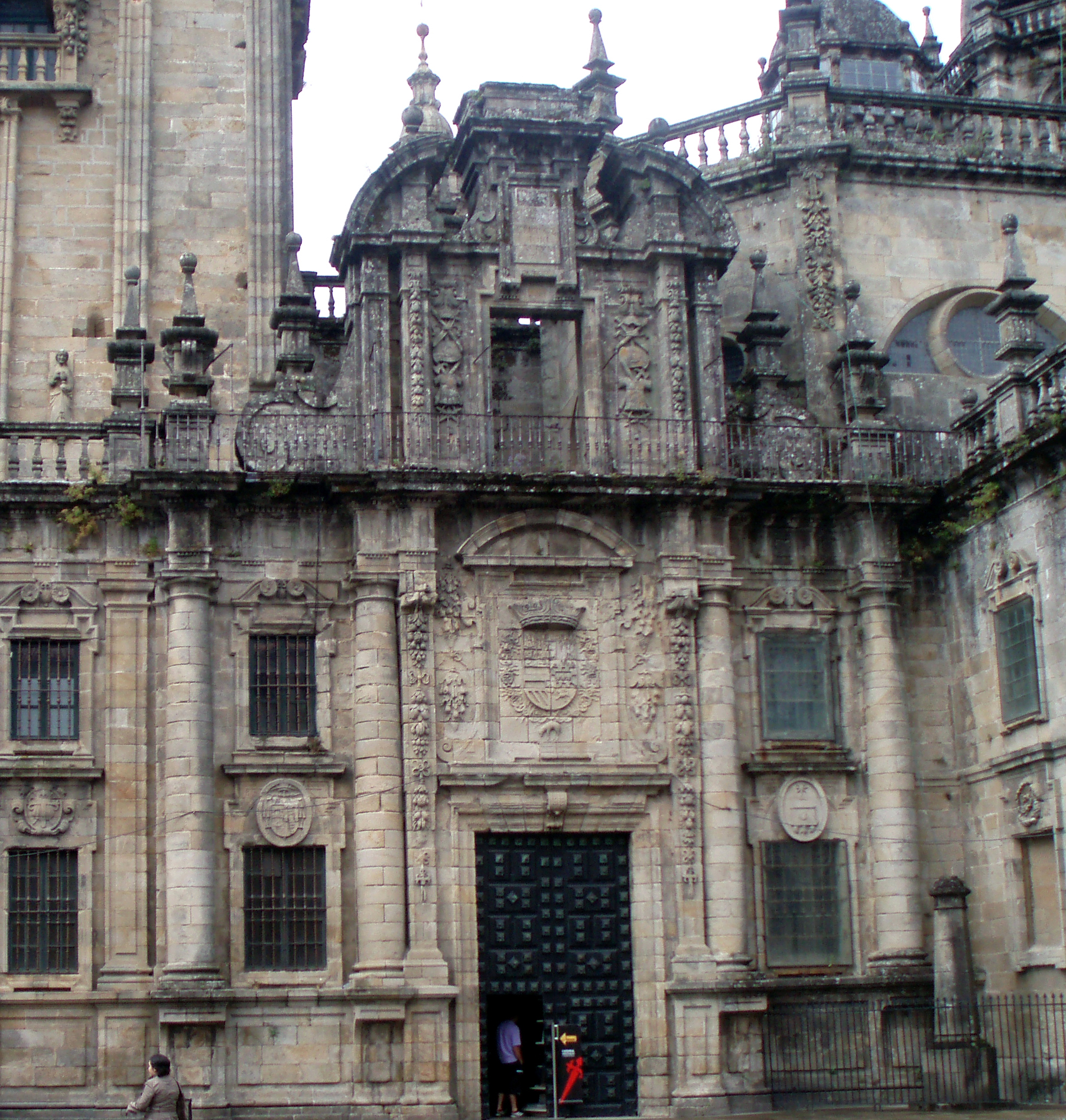
Porta Real

The façade of the cathedral that overlooks the Plaza de la Quintana has two gates: the Porta Real (royal gate) and the Porta Santa (holy gate). The construction of the Porta Real, baroque, was begun under the direction of José de Vega y Verdugo and by José de la Peña de Toro in 1666, and was completed by Domingo de Andrade in 1700, who built some of the columns that span two floors of windows, a balustrade with large pinnacles, and an aedicula with an equestrian statue of Saint James (now disappeared), well adorned with decorative fruit clusters and large-scale military trophies. The kings of Spain entered the cathedral through this door, hence its name, and the royal coat of arms on its lintel.

The holy door (Porta Santa) or Door of Forgiveness (Porta do Perdón) is the closest to the steps. It is usually closed with a fence and opened only in a Jacobean holy year (years when Saint James' Day, 25 July, falls on a Sunday). It was one of the seven lesser gates and was dedicated to St. Pelagius (for whom is named a convent just opposite). On this door niches contain the image of James, with his disciples Athanasius and Theodore at his side. On the bottom and sides of the door were placed twenty-four figures of prophets and apostles (including St. James) coming from the old stone choir of Master Mateo. Inside this door through a small courtyard is the true Holy Door, which enters into the ambulatory of the apse of the church.

=== Bell Towers ===
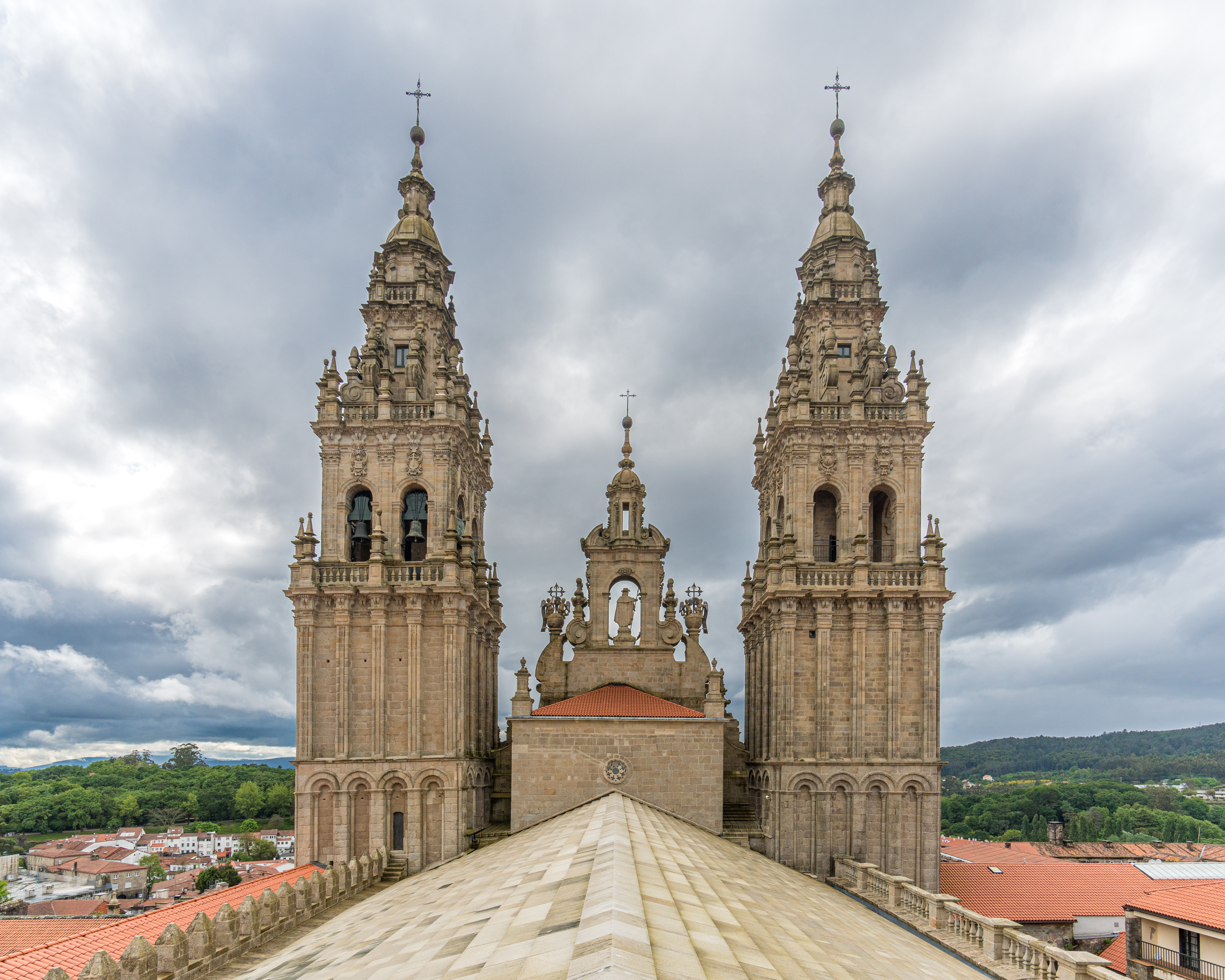
The bell tower (left) and carraca tower (right) as seen from the renovated stone rooftop. At the bottom, it is still possible to see the Romanesque arches of the original towers, and their previous top height.

The early towers in the main façade of the cathedral were Romanesque (current façade of the Obradoiro). They are called the Torre das Campás, which is situated on the side of the Epistle (right) and Torre da Carraca, to the side of the Gospel (left). The two have a height of between 75 and 80 metres.

The first part of the tower was built in the 12th century, but in the 15th century several modifications were made and King Louis XI of France donated in 1483 the two largest of the thirteen bells.

Due to a tilt that was detected in its structure between the 16th and 17th centuries, the towers had to be reinforced with buttresses, between 1667 and 1670. The towers housing the bells were made by José de la Peña de Toro (1614–1676) in a baroque style, and completed by Domingo de Andrade. The architecture of the towers has a great effect in perspective with its vertical lines and the sequencing of its floors.

=== North Tower or da Carraca ===
It is located to the left of the façade del Obradoiro, and was built – like its partner – on the opposite side of an earlier tower of the Romanesque period. It was designed by Fernando de Casas Novoa in 1738, imitating the bell towers by Peña de Toro and Domingo de Andrade in the 17th century: baroque decorations adorned all kinds of ornamentation that provided a unifying architecture across the façade.

=== Clock Tower, Torre da Trindade or Berenguela ===
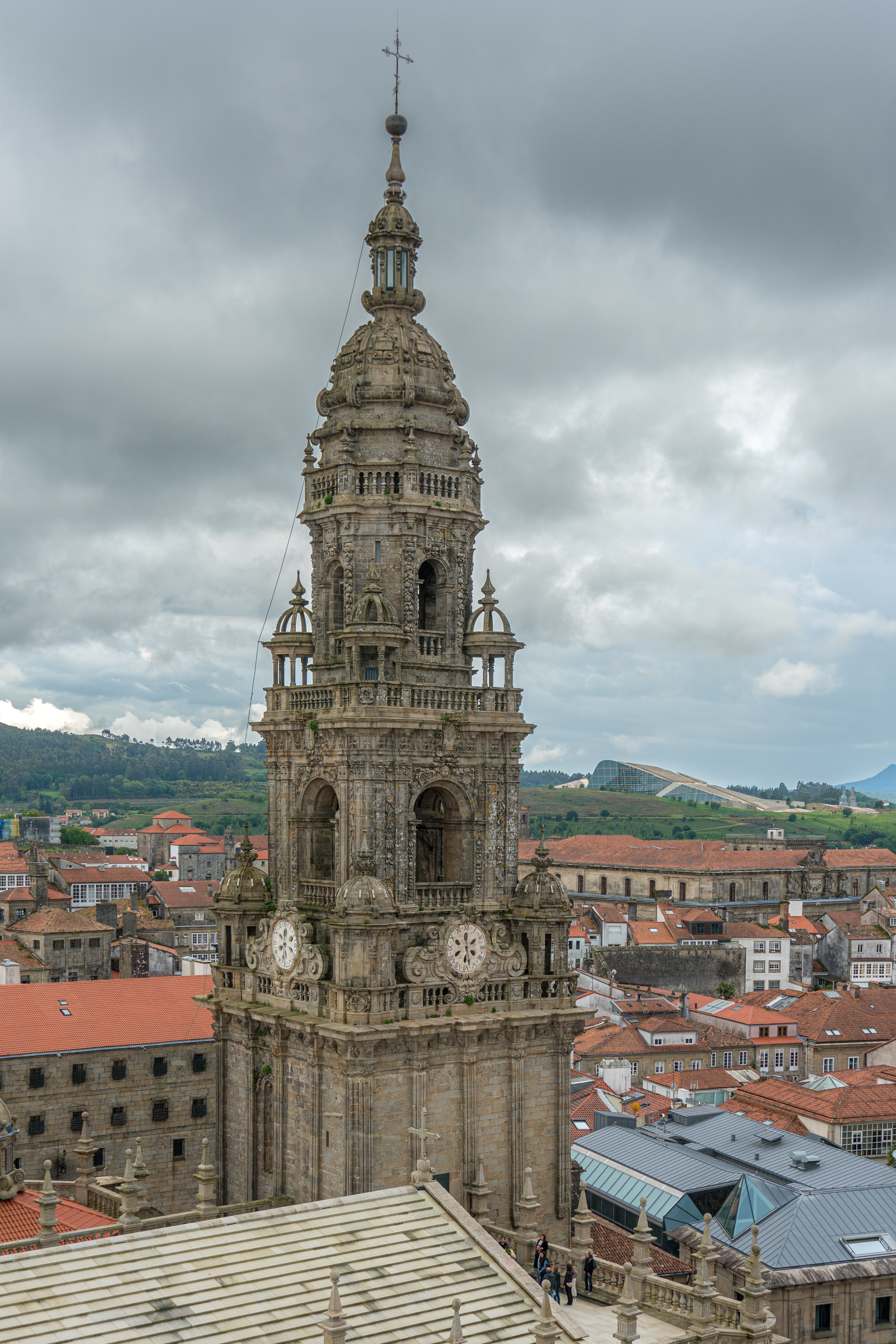
Clock Tower

The Clock Tower, also called Torre da Trindade or, Berenguela, is at the intersection of the Pratarías square and the Quintana Square. Traditionally, construction was thought to begin in 1316, at the request of Archbishop Rodrigo del Padrón as a defence tower. After his death his successor, Archbishop Bérenger de Landore, continued work on it, though these dates are questioned by some authors. When he became main master of the cathedral, Domingo de Andrade continued with its construction and between 1676 and 1680 raised it two floors higher; the use of various structures achieved a harmonious and ornamental design, with a pyramid-shaped crown and a lantern as a final element, with four light bulbs permanently lit. It rises to 75 m (246 ft).

In 1833, a clock was placed on each side of the tower by Andrés Antelo, commissioned by the Archbishop Rafael de Vélez. As part of its mechanism it has two bells, one, at the hour, called Berenguela, and a smaller one marking the quarter hours. These two were cast in 1729 by Güemes Sampedro. Berenguela has a diameter of 255 cm (100 in) and a height of 215 cm (85 in), weighing approximately 9,600 kg (21,200 lb), and the smaller weighs 1,839 kg (4,054 lb) with a diameter of 147 cm (58 in) and a height of 150 cm (59 in). Both original bells cracked, forcing their replacement. The current replicas were cast in Asten (Netherlands) by the Eijsbouts house in 1989 and were placed in the cathedral in February 1990.

During a Jacobean Holy Year, pilgrims may enter the cathedral through the holy door (Porta Santa) to gain a plenary indulgence. During a holy year, the lantern of the Berenguela Tower is lit throughout the year. otherwise it stays unlit. The light acts as a lighthouse to guide pilgrims to the cathedral during the holy years.

== Interior ==
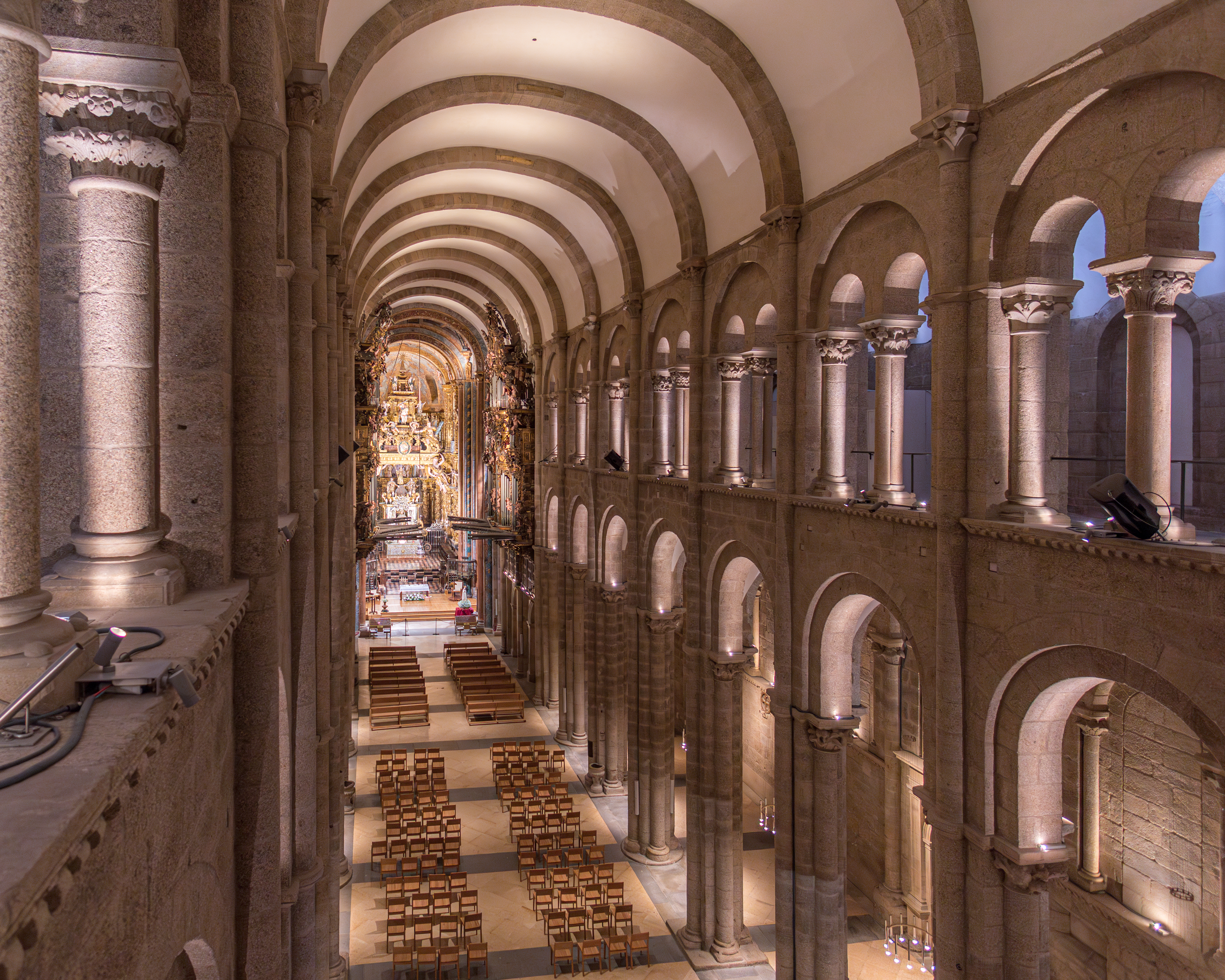
General view of the central nave

The cathedral is 97 m (318 ft) long and 22 m (72 ft) high. It preserves its original, barrel-vaulted, cruciform, Romanesque interior. It consists of a nave, two lateral aisles, a wide transept, and a choir with radiating chapels. Compared with many other important churches, the interior of this cathedral gives a first impression of austerity until one enters further and sees the magnificent organ and the exuberance of the choir. It is the largest Romanesque church in Spain and one of the largest in Europe.

=== Portico of Glory ===
The Portico of Glory ("Pórtico da Gloria" in Galician) of the Cathedral of Santiago de Compostela is a Romanesque portico by Master Mateo and his workshop commissioned by King Ferdinand II of León. To commemorate its completion in 1188, the date was carved on a stone and set in the cathedral, and the lintels were placed on the portico. Finalising the complete three-piece set took until 1211, when the temple was consecrated in the presence of King Alfonso IX of León.

The portico has three round arches that correspond to the three naves of the church, supported by thick piers with pilasters. The central arch, twice as wide as the other two, has a tympanum and is divided by a central column—a mullion—containing a depiction of Saint James. Vertically, the lower part is formed by the bases of the columns, decorated with fantastic animals, the middle portion consists of columns adorned with statues of the Apostles, and the upper part supports the base of the arches crowning the three doors. The sculpture is intended to serve as an iconographic representation of various symbols derived from the Book of Revelation and books of the Old Testament.

==== Tympanum ====
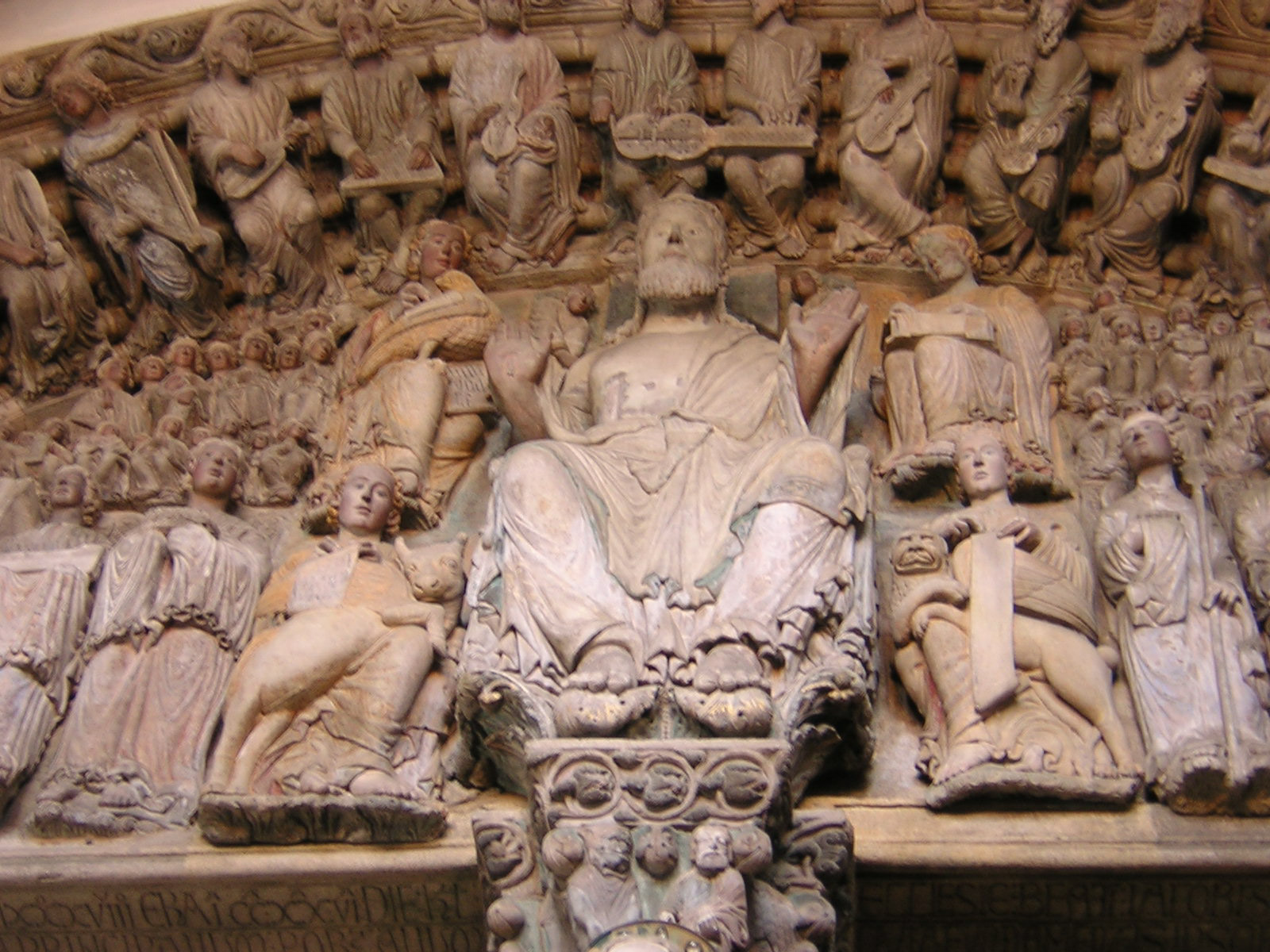
Pantokrator's tympanum Pórtico da Gloria

The arrangement of the tympanum is based on the description of Christ that John the Evangelist makes in Revelation (Chapter 1 v 1 to 18). In the centre, the Pantocrator is shown, with the image of Christ in Majesty, displaying in his hands and feet the wounds of crucifixion. Surrounding Christ is the tetramorph with the figures of the four Evangelists with their attributes: left, top St. John and the eagle and below St. Luke with the ox; on the right above, St. Matthew on the hood of the tax collector and below St. Mark and the lion.

On both sides of the evangelists, behind Mark and Luke, there are four angels on each side with the instruments of the Passion of Christ. Some are, without touching them directly, the cross and crown of thorns (left) and lance and four nails (right), another the column in which he was whipped and the jar through which Pontius Pilate proclaimed his innocence. Above the heads of these angels, two large groups of souls of the blessed, forty in all. In the archivolt of the central tympanum are seated the Elders of the Apocalypse, each holding a musical instrument, as if preparing a concert in honor of God.

==== Mullion ====
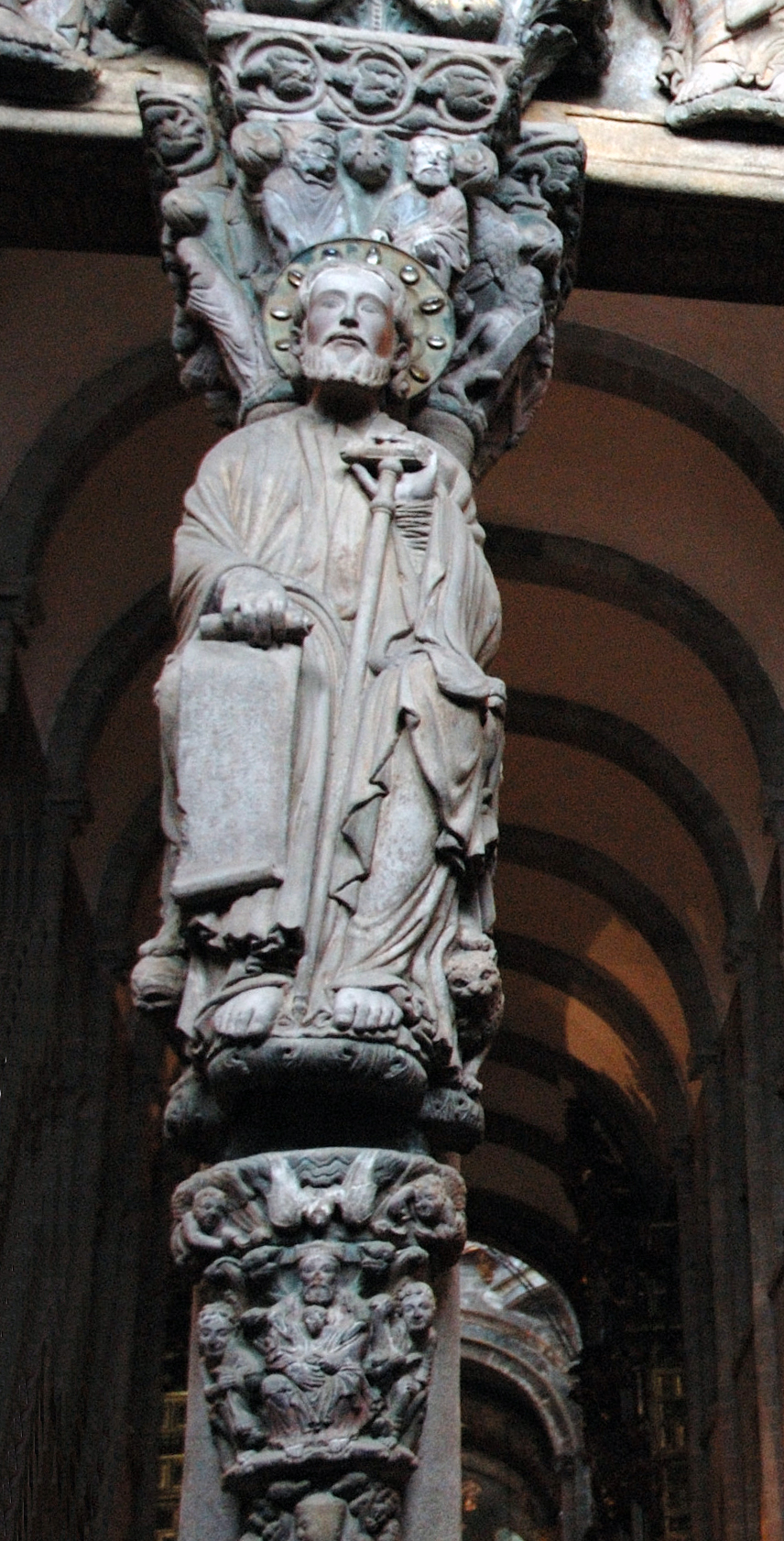
Mullion with the figure of Santiago

In the mullion, the figure of Saint James is seated with a pilgrim's staff, as a patron of the basilica. St. James appears with a scroll which contains written Misit me Dominus (the Lord sent me). The column just above his head with a capital which represents the temptations of Christ. On three of its sides, facing the inside of the temple, two kneeling angels pray. At the foot of the saint there is another capital with the figures of the Holy Trinity. Under the Apostle there is a representation of the tree of Jesse, the name given to the family tree of Jesus Christ from Jesse, father of King David; this is the first time that this subject is represented in religious iconography in the Iberian Peninsula. The column rests on a base where there is a figure with beard to his chest (perhaps an image of Noah) and two lions. At the foot of the central column at the top inside, looking towards the main altar of the cathedral, there is the kneeling figure of the Master Mateo himself, holding a sign on which is written Architectus. This image is popularly known as Santo dos Croques from the ancient tradition of students hitting their heads against the figure for wisdom, a tradition that was adopted later by pilgrims, although steps are being taken to limit access, to stem deterioration from which the work has suffered.

==== Jambs ====
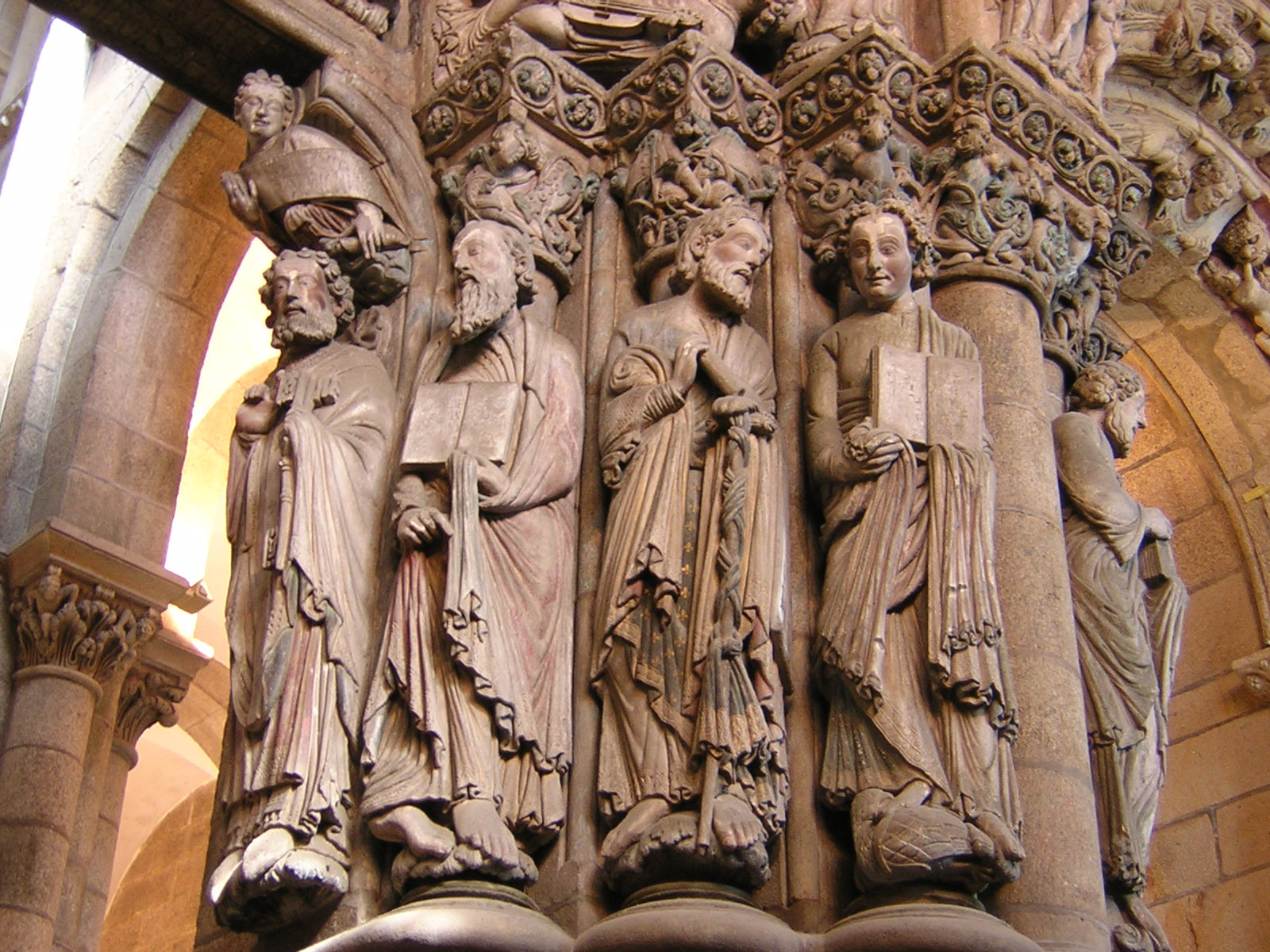
Apostles of the jambs of the Pórtico da Gloria

In the columns of the central door and two side doors, the apostles are represented, as well as prophets and other figures with their iconographic attributes. All are topped with its own capital which represents different animals and human heads with leaf motifs. The names of all the figures are on the books or scrolls held in their hands.

The four pillars of the portico are based on strong foundations which represent various groups of animals and human heads with beards. For some historians, these figures are images of demons and symbolize the weight of glory (the portico in this case) crushing sin. Other sources give an apocalyptic interpretation, with wars, famine and death (represented by the beasts) with situations that can only be saved by human intelligence (the heads of older men).

==== Side doors ====
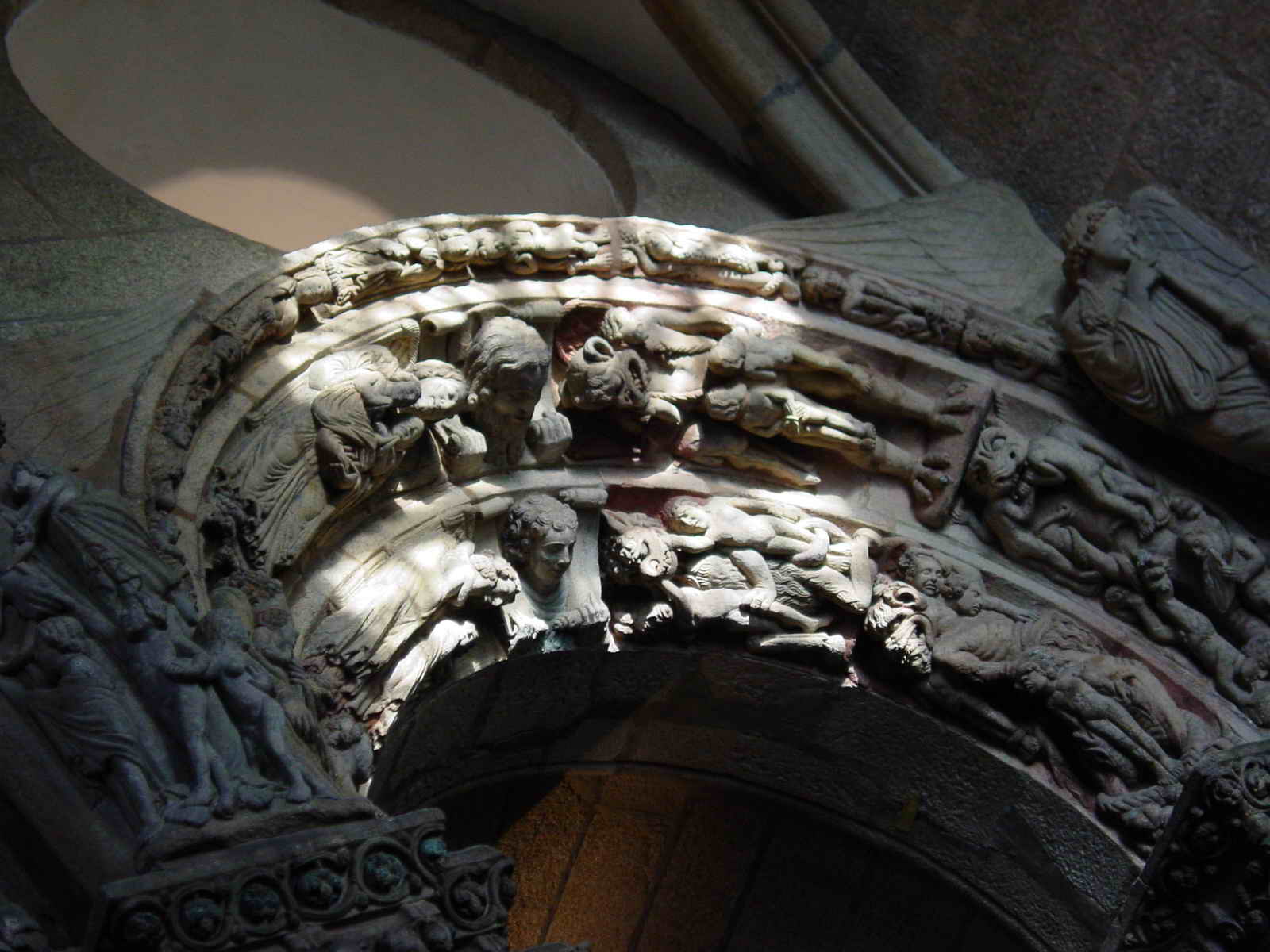
The archivolt of the right door is the Last Judgment.

The arch of the right door represents the Last Judgment. The double archivolt is divided into two equal parts by two heads. Some authors identify these heads with the figures of archangel Michael and Christ. For others, they are Christ-Judge and an angel or may indicate God the Father and God the Son. To the right of these heads, Hell is represented with figures of monsters (demons) that drag and torture the souls of the damned. On the left is Heaven with the elect, with figures of angels with children symbolizing the saved souls.

The arch of the left door depicts scenes from the Old Testament, with the righteous awaiting the arrival of the Savior. In the center of the first archivolt is God the Creator who blesses the pilgrim and holds the Book of Eternal Truth; to his right are Adam (naked), Abraham (with the index raised), and Jacob. With them are two figures that could be Noah (new father of humanity saved through the Flood) and Esau or Isaac and Judah. To the left of God are Eve, Moses, Aaron, King David and Solomon. In the second archivolt, the top, ten small figures represent the twelve tribes of Israel.

=== The nave ===
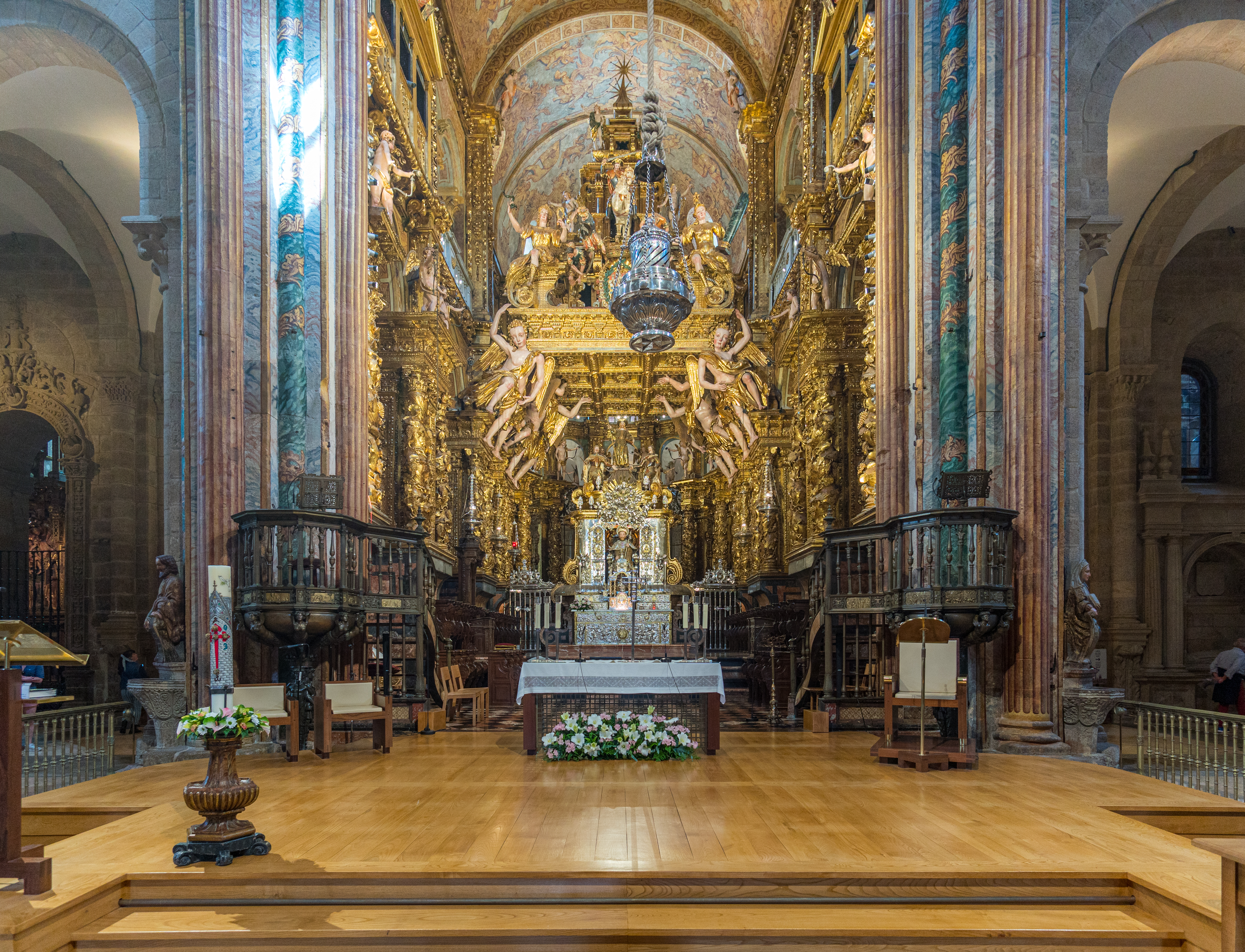
Main altar

The barrel-vaulted nave and the groin-vaulted aisles consist of eleven bays, while the wide transept consists of six bays. Every clustered pier is flanked by semi-columns, three of which carry the cross vaults of the side aisles and the truss of the arched vaults, while the fourth reaches to the spring of the vault. Lit galleries run, at a remarkable height, above the side aisles around the church.

The choir is covered by three bays and surrounded with an ambulatory and five radiating chapels. The vault of the apse is pierced by round windows, forming a clerestory. The choir displays a surprising exuberance in this Romanesque setting. An enormous baldachin, with a sumptuous decorated statue of Saint James from the 13th century, rises above the main altar. The pilgrims can kiss the saint's mantle via a narrow passage behind the altar.

In the choir aisle the lattice work and the vault of the Mondragon chapel (1521) stand out. The radiating chapels constitute a museum of paintings, retables, reliquaries and sculptures, accumulated throughout the centuries. In the Chapel of the Reliquary (Galician: Capela do Relicario) is a gold crucifix, dated 874, containing an alleged piece of the True Cross.

=== Crypt ===
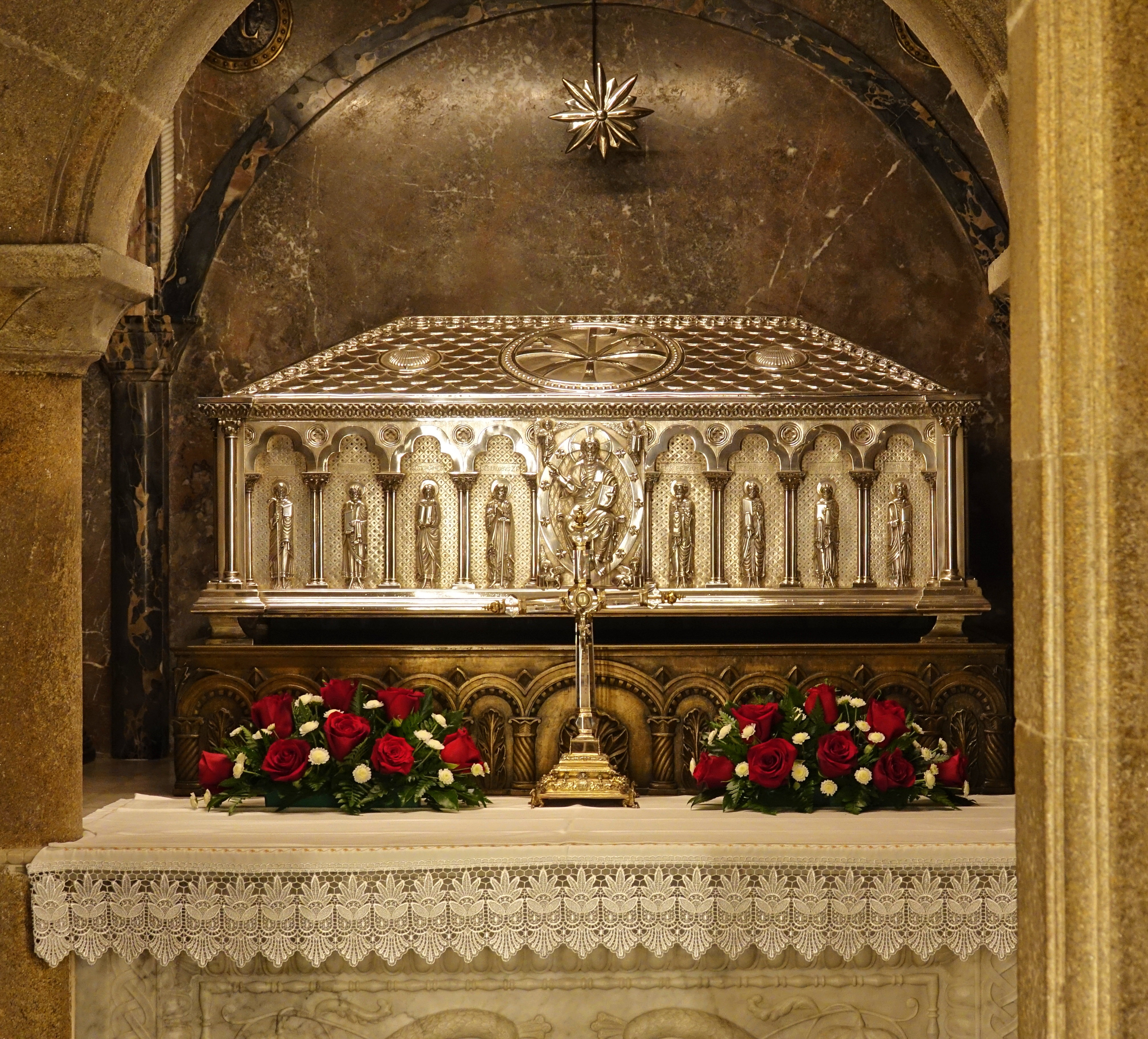
Reliquary in the cathedral crypt

The crypt, below the main altar, shows the substructure of the 9th-century church. This was the final destination of the pilgrims. The crypt houses the unconfirmed relics of Saint James and potentially two of his disciples: Saint Theodorus and Saint Athanasius. The silver reliquary (by José Losada, 1886) was put in the crypt at the end of the 19th century, after authentication of the relics by Pope Leo XIII in 1884.

Throughout the course of time, the burial place of the saint had been almost forgotten. Because of regular Dutch and English incursions, the relics had been transferred in 1589 from their place under the main altar to a safer place. They were rediscovered in January 1879.

=== Botafumeiro ===
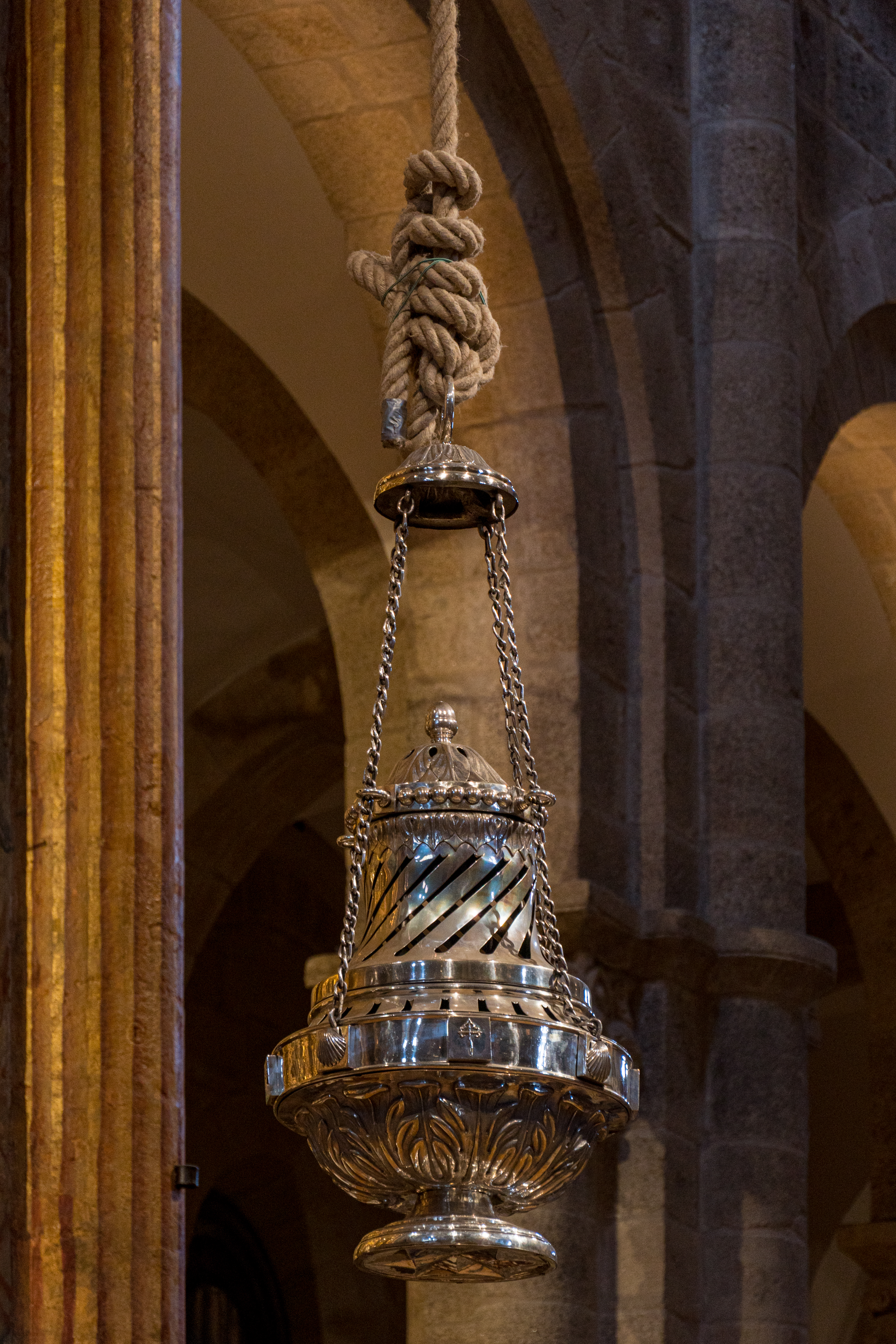
The swinging Botafumeiro dispensing clouds of incense

A dome above the crossing contains the pulley mechanism to swing the "Botafumeiro", which is a famous thurible found in this church. It was created by the goldsmith José Losada in 1851. The Santiago de Compostela Botafumeiro is the largest censer in the world, weighing 80 kg (180 lb) and measuring 1.6 m (5.2 ft) in height. It is normally on exhibition in the library of the cathedral, but during certain important religious holidays it is attached to the pulley mechanism, filled with 40 kg (88 lb) of charcoal and incense. In the Jubilee Years (whenever St James's Day falls on a Sunday) the Botafumeiro is also used in all the Pilgrims' Masses. Eight red-robed tiraboleiros pull the ropes and bring it into a swinging motion almost to the roof of the transept, reaching speeds of 80 km/h (50 mph) and dispensing thick clouds of incense.

== Other burials ==
- Alfonso Daniel Rodríguez Castelao, at the Panteón de Galegos Ilustres ("Pantheon of Illustrious Galicians"), Bonaval
- Fructuosus of Braga
- Rosalía de Castro
- Fernando Pérez de Traba
- Ferdinand II of León
- Alfonso IX of León
- Pedro Fernández de Castro
- Gaspar de Ávalos de la Cueva

== Old images ==
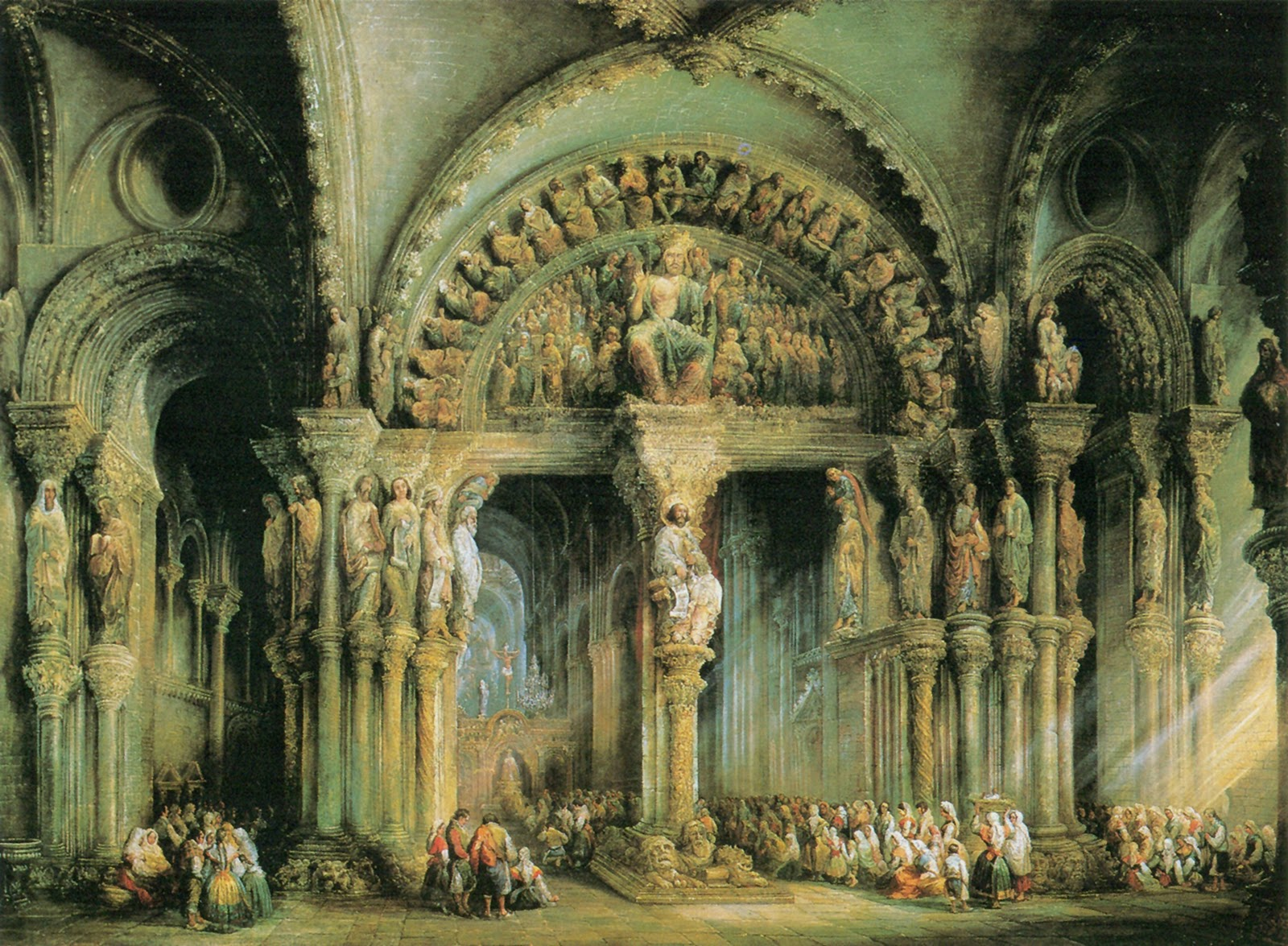
Pórtico da Gloria in 1849 by Jenaro Pérez Villaamil

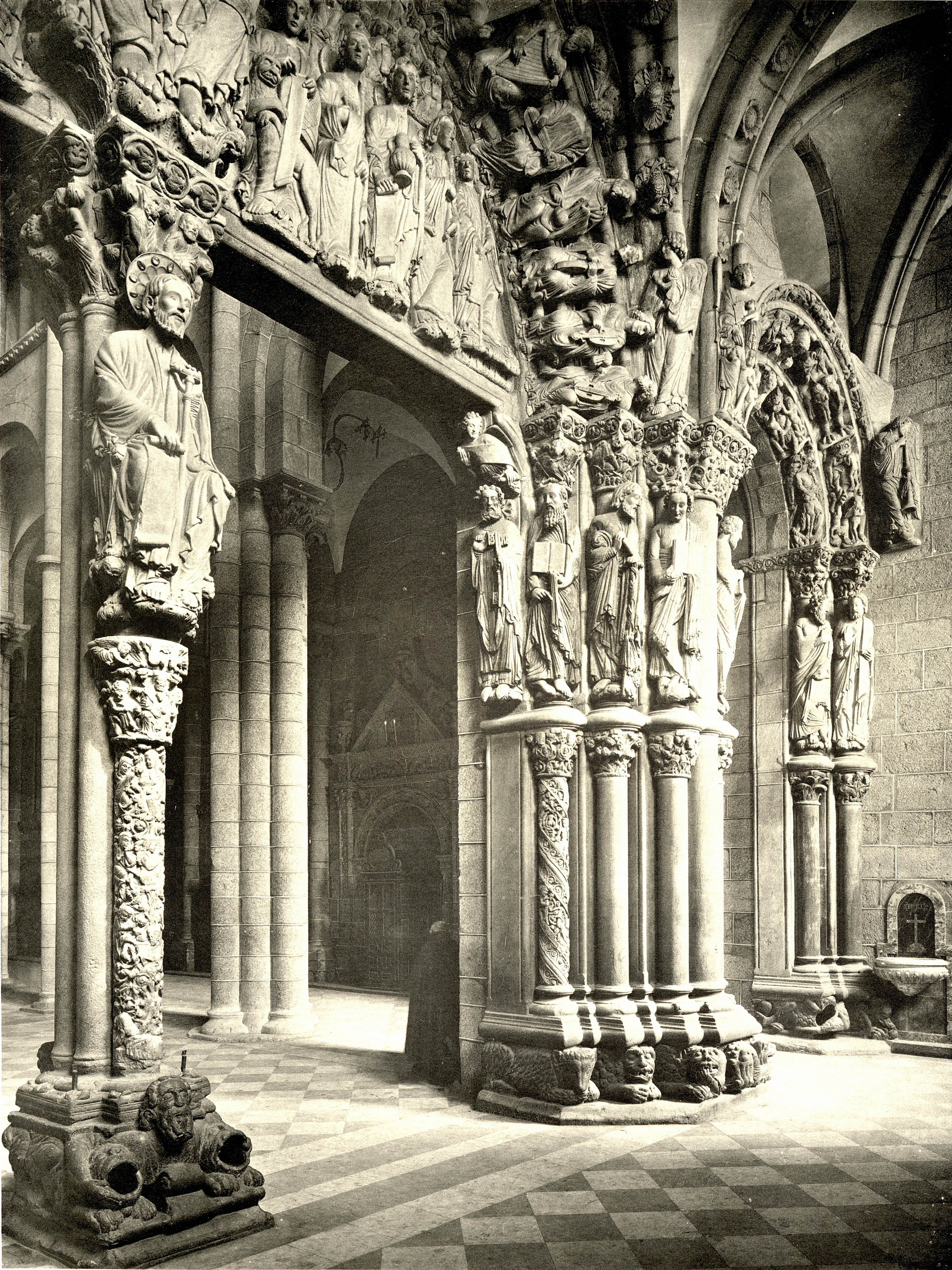
Pórtico da Gloria, Collotype 1889

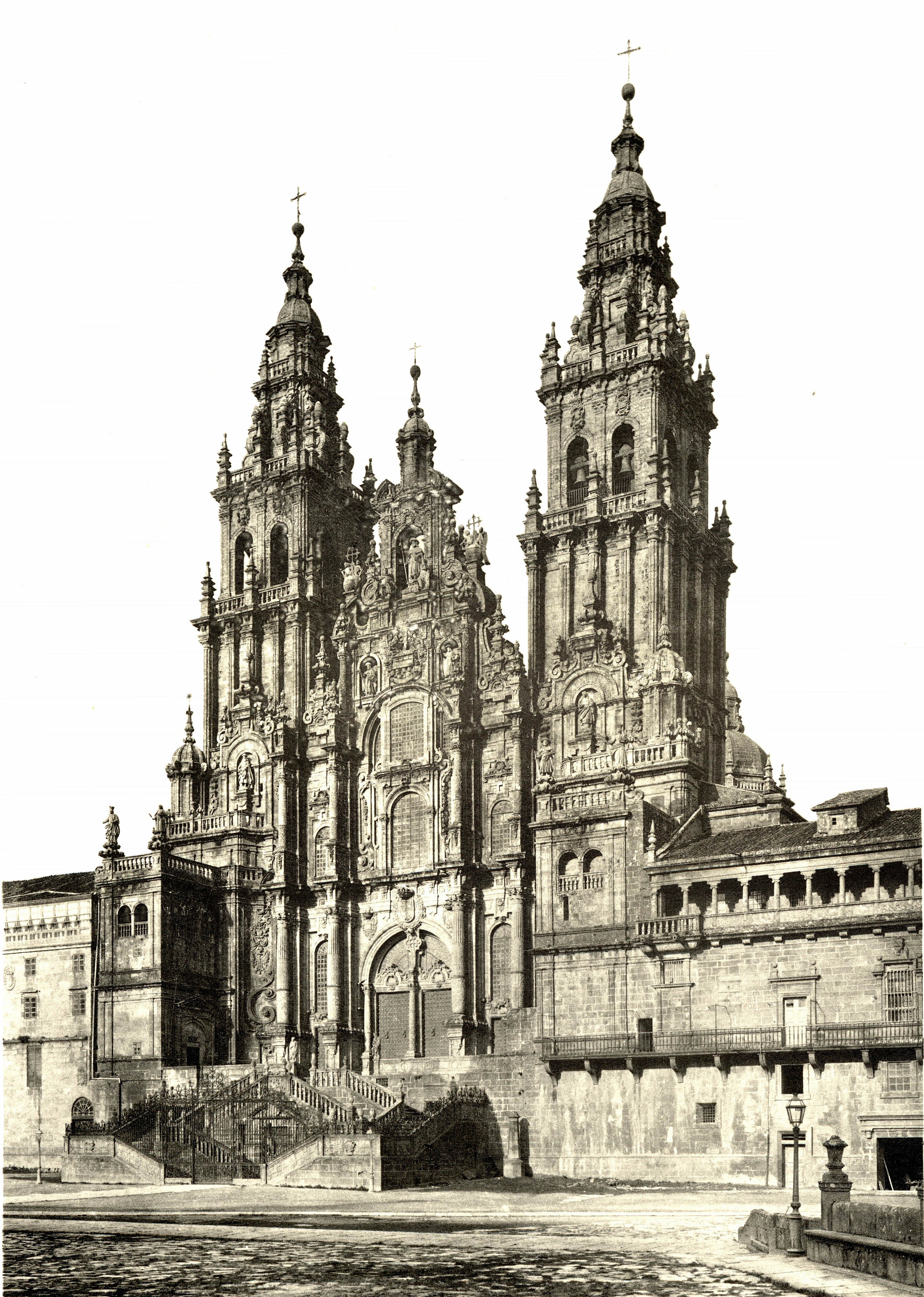
Westside main façade of the Cathedral towards Plaza del Obradoiro, Collotype 1889

== See also ==
- Asturian architecture
- Catholic Church in Spain
- Santiago de Compostela
- 12 Treasures of Spain
- List of Christian pilgrimage sites
- High medieval domes

== Bibliography ==
- Álvarez Martínez, Rosario (2002). Music Iconography of Romanesque Sculpture in the Light of Sculptors' Work Procedures: The Jaca Cathedral, Las Platerías in Santiago de Compostela, and San Isidoro de León. Vol. 27. pp. 13–45. ISSN 1522-7464.
- Bravo Lozano, Millán (1999). Camino de Santiago Inolvidable. León: Everest. ISBN 84-241-3905-4.
- Carro Otero, Xosé (1997). Santiago de Compostela. publisher Everest. ISBN 84-241-3625-X.
- Chamorro Lamas, Manuel; González, Victoriano; Regal, Bernardo (1997). Rutas románicas en Galicia/1. Ediciones Encuentro. ISBN 84-7490-411-0.
- Fraguas Fraguas, Antonio (2004). Romerías y santuarios de Galicia. publisher Galaxia. p. 20. ISBN 978-84-8288-704-3.
- Fuertes Domínguez, Gregorio (1969). Guía de Santiago, sus monumentos, su arte. Depósito Legal C. 325–1969. El Eco Franciscano.
- García Iglesias, José Manuel (1993). A catedral de Santiago: A Idade Moderna (in Galician). Xuntanxa. ISBN 8486614694.
- Garrido Torres, Carlos (2000). Las Guías visuales de España: Galicia. Depósito legal: B 18469. El País.
- Gómez Moreno, María Elena (1947). Mil Joyas del Arte Español, Piezas selectas, Monumentos magistrales: Tomo primero Antigüedad y Edad Media. Barcelona: Instituto Gallach.
- Navascués Palacio, Pedro; Sarthou Carreres, Carlos (1997). Catedrales de España. Edición especial para el Banco Bilbao Vizcaya. Madrid: Espasa Calpe. ISBN 84-239-7645-9. OCLC 249825366.
- Otero Pedrayo, Ramón (1965). Guía de Galicia (4ª ed.). publisher Galaxia. pp. 351ff.
- Portela Silva, E. (2003). Historia de la ciudad de Santiago de Compostela. Universidad de Santiago de Compostela. ISBN 8497501373.
- Sanmartín, Juan R. (1984). "O Botafumeiro: Parametric pumping in the Middle Ages". American Journal of Physics. 52 (10): 937–945. Bibcode:1984AmJPh..52..937S. doi:10.1119/1.13798.
- Vaqueiro, Vítor (1998). Guía da Galiza máxica, mítica e lendaria (in Galician). Galaxia. ISBN 8482882058.
- Vázquez Varela, J. M.; Yzquierdo Perrín, R.; García Iglesias, J. M.; Castro, A. (1996). 100 obras mestras da arte galega (in Galician). Nigra Arte. ISBN 84-87709-50-8.
- Villa-Amil y Castro, José (1866). Descripción histórico-artístico-arqueológica de la catedral de Santiago. Impr. de Soto Freire.
- Turner, Jane (1996). Grove Dictionary of Art. Macmillan Publishers Ltd. ISBN 0-19-517068-7.
