= Master Mateo =

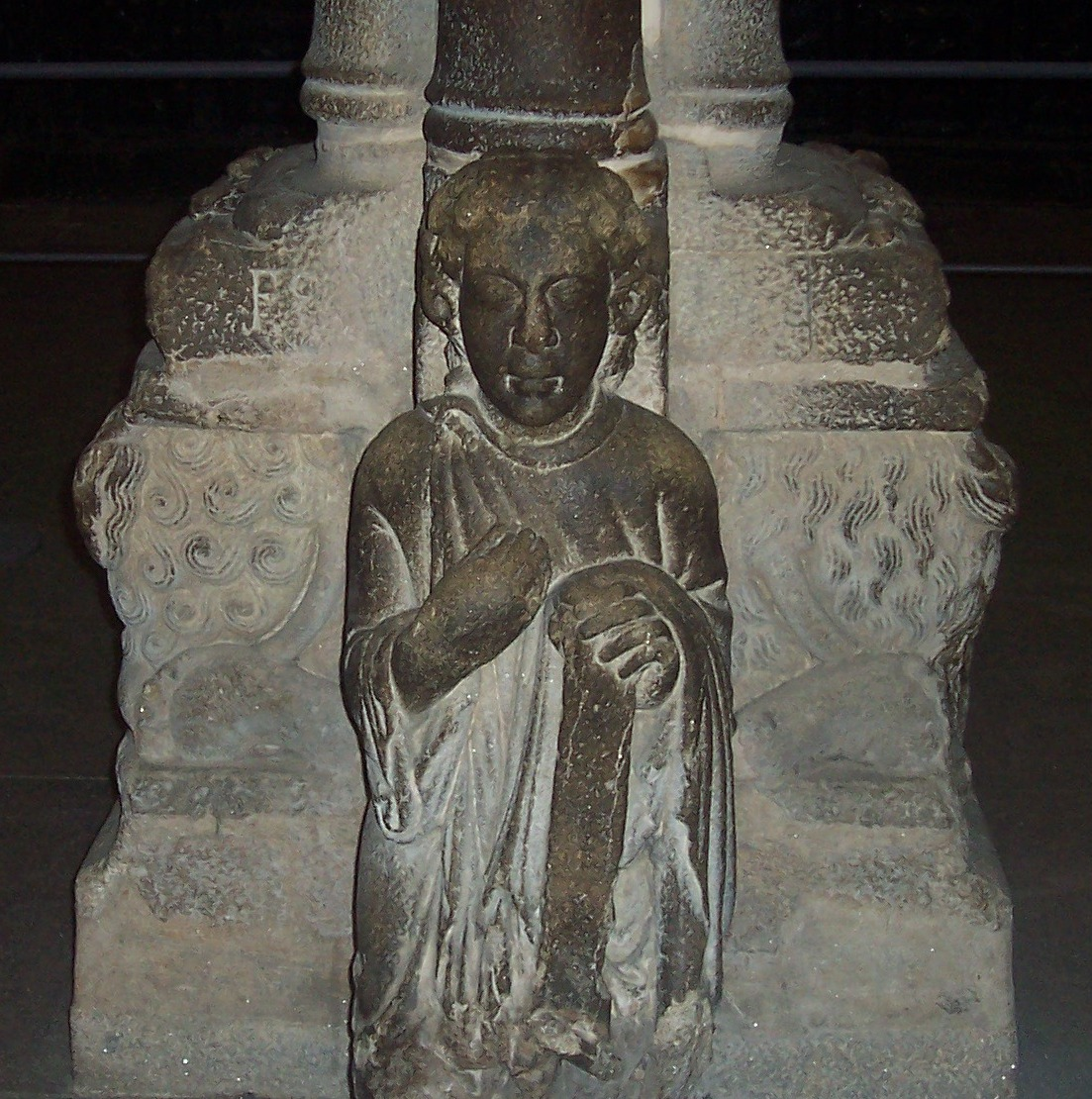
Mestre Mateo (Santo dos Croques) Cathedral of Santiago de Compostela

Master Mateo was a sculptor and architect in charge of the works at the Santiago de Compostela Cathedral in Galicia, Spain, from at least 1168. He directed a building project that culminated in the cathedral's consecration in 1211.

== Background ==
The earliest evidence of Master Mateo's work at the Santiago de Compostela Cathedral is a document dated 23 February 1168. In it, King Ferdinand II of León granted Mateo a lifetime pension in return for taking charge of the cathedral works. The document is preserved in the cathedral's archives.

== Work ==
Master Mateo's project at the cathedral was developed between 1168 and 1211. It included the completion of the western end of the building, the construction of the Portico of Glory, its crypt and exterior façade. The project also included the adaptation of the cathedral's interior for ceremonial use with a stone choir and a seated image of Saint James on the main altar.

The project involved a workshop in which several craftsmen participated. Mateo was responsible for managing, planning and directing the work, as well as for its execution. The cathedral was consecrated in 1211, by which time the stone choir had also been completed.
