= Fernando de Casas Novoa =

Spanish architect

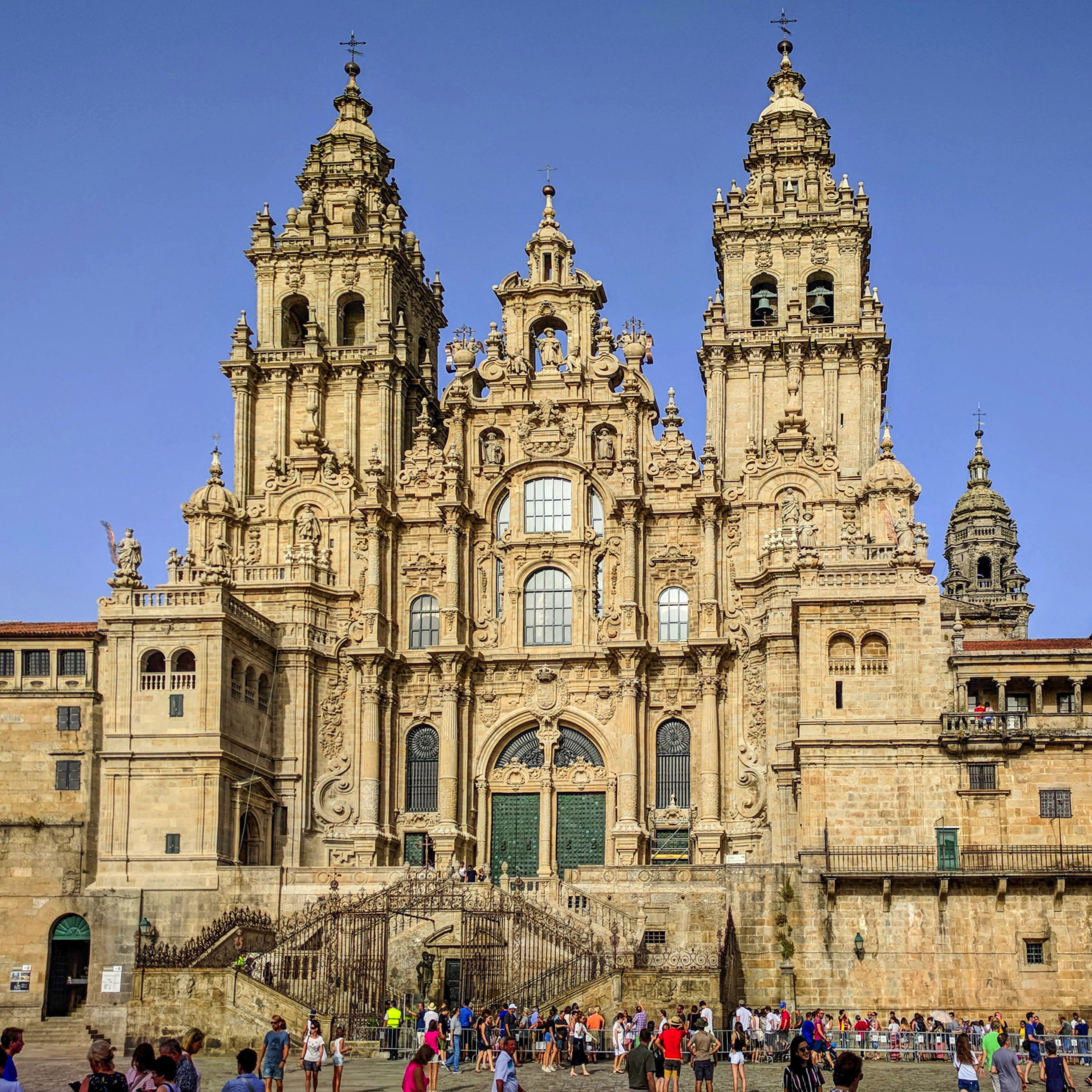
Facade of Obradoiro

Fernando de Casas Novoa was a Spanish architect. He was the chief representative of Baroque architecture in Galicia. In 1711 he succeeded his teacher, Brother Gabriel Casas, head of the works of the cloister of the cathedral of Lugo, completed in 1714.

== Background ==
In this work and in the convents of the Capuchins in A Coruña and Santiago Dominican Belvis of classical solutions adopted, inspired by the architecture of the sixteenth century. But from 1725 evolved into the purest baroque and vibrant are his masterpieces: the Chapel of Our Lady of the Big Eye in the cathedral of Lugo, and, above all, the facade of Obradoiro, the cathedral Santiago de Compostela, in which movement, decoration and buoyancy effects create flavorful Baroque.
