= Tiangong censer =

Type of incense burner

The Tiangong censer (Chinese: 天公爐; pinyin: tian gong lu) is a distinctive type of incense burner traditionally used in the religious veneration of the Jade Emperor (玉皇大帝), the supreme deity in traditional Chinese cosmology. It holds a central place in Chinese folk religion, where the worship of celestial deities follows unique ritual practices.is a special type of incense burner used for the religious worship of the Jade Emperor. Considered the highest-ranking deity in Chinese religion, a typical religious custom for worship of the deity in Taiwan in particular is not to create or enshrine physical statues of the Jade Emperor. Instead, the deity is honored through symbolic representations, with the censer often serving as a focal point during offerings and prayers.

The typical Tiangong censer is crafted in the form of a tripod, with three sturdy legs supporting a round basin, symbolizing stability and harmony between heaven, earth, and humanity. While the round form is the most common, square censers are also found. General ornamentation motifs include dragons clutching pearls, a representation of cosmic power and balance. Additionally, the ears or handles of the censer often feature ascending or descending dragons, symbolizing communication between the earthly realm and the heavens. Historically, Tiangong censers were predominantly made from durable materials such as stone, iron, or bronze though large metallic censers though, in Taiwan, it is rare to find large metal censers from before the Japanese rule, as many have been melted down and reused.

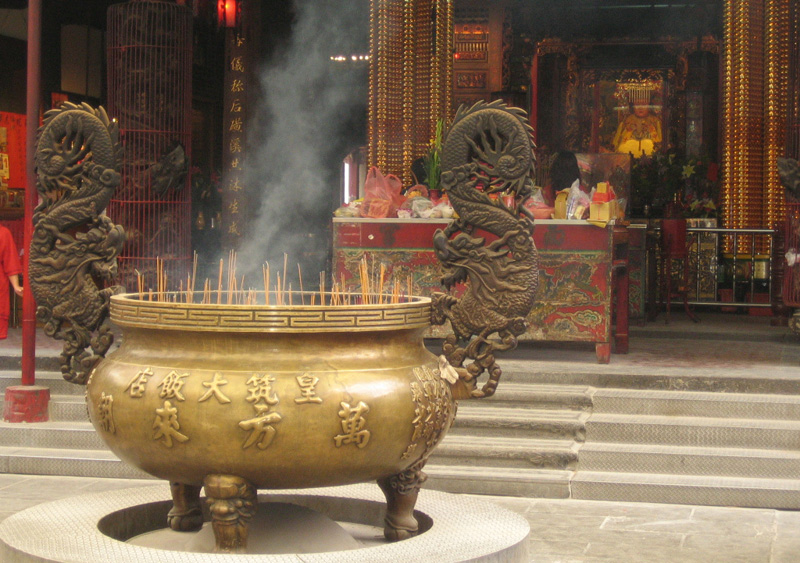
Tiangong censer at Nan Yao Palace, Changhua

== Classification ==
The form of the Tiangong censer may vary depending on the region or location, and is adjusted according to Customs and other factors.

=== Domestic ===
- Hoklo Taiwanese people hang a censer called Tiangong in the middle of the hall beam in Taiwan. The censer is hung with four chains, which are suspended from the sky and the earth. The four heavenly ministers are in charge of the four directions and seasons.
- Taiwanese people of Zhangzhou descent changed the number of chains from four to three to symbolize inviting the Three Great Emperor-Officials, who are in charge of the three realms of heaven, earth, and water, to pay respect to the Jade Emperor. This is because they believe that only kings could authorize temples to offer sacrifice to heaven in ancient times. The censer used is sometimes called the "Three Realm Furnace" or "Three Realm Gong Furnace".
- Taiwan Hakka's Tiangong censer is also known as wall Buddha, sky worship, and Tiangong Pagoda. The incense burner is usually placed on the inside left side of the door or in the recess of the wall pillar, and the words "Jade Emperor's Divine Position" or "Heavenly God's Blessing Incense Position" are written on red paper. It is also said that the Hakka people also called the Tiangong censer as "Sun Gong" or "Sun God", which is a metaphor for "Anti-Qing sentiment". "Since the Hakka ancestors regarded themselves as a Central Plains scholar and considered the Qing dynasty Manchus as a foreign nationality, they placed the Tiangong censer outdoors and worshipped the Sun God in the name of worshipping the Ming dynasty as Han Chinese.
- Matsu people who worship gods and ancestors in their homes will put incense burners in front of their doors to worship the gods of heaven. The location is on the left hand side of the doorway, that is, the dragon side of the main door of the residence (dragon side is large) Some shapes also reflect the occupation of the owner, such as fish-shaped incense burners representing fishermen and scroll-shaped incense burners representing public educators; generally, clean iron cans wrapped in red paper are commonly used to nail the sides of the doors or decorated with paper-cut flowers. Before worshipping the gods (or ancestors), incense should be offered to the gods (or ancestors) in order.

In addition, in general, families mainly worship the family gods, so they do not set up a four-legged floor standing censer at home. According to folklore, if you set up such a censer in your home, you are setting up a palace altar for fear of attracting Goryō to your home to seek justice.

=== Temples ===
The location and size of the Tiangong censer be changed depending on the building, such as in the courtyard or in front of the pavilion outside the temple, but there are still several common points in their setup.

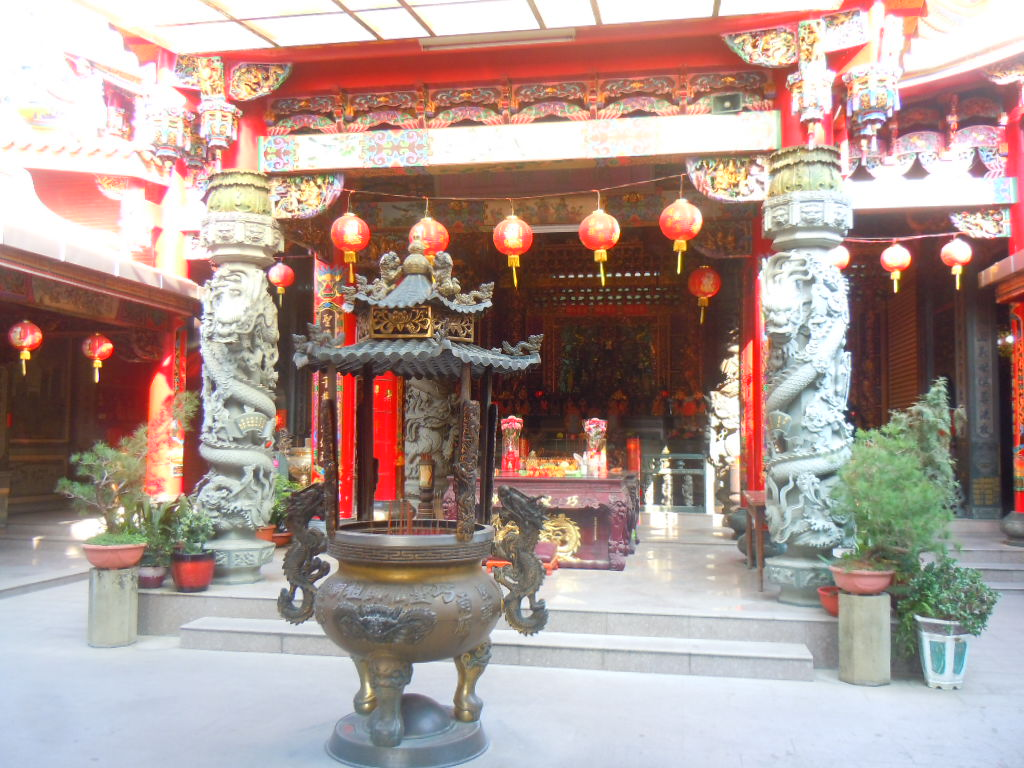
Typical arrangement of a Tiangong censerTwo feet pointing inwards as normal

- The Tiangong censer must be set up with the sky in view.
- The censer has three feet, symbolizing the triad of Tiger, Horse, and Dog, i.e., the triad of heaven, earth, and man.
- Most of the three feet are placed with two feet facing inward and one foot facing outward. see image for demonstration
