= Colexio de San Xerome =

College in Galicia, Spain

Coordinates: 42°52′48″N 8°32′44″W

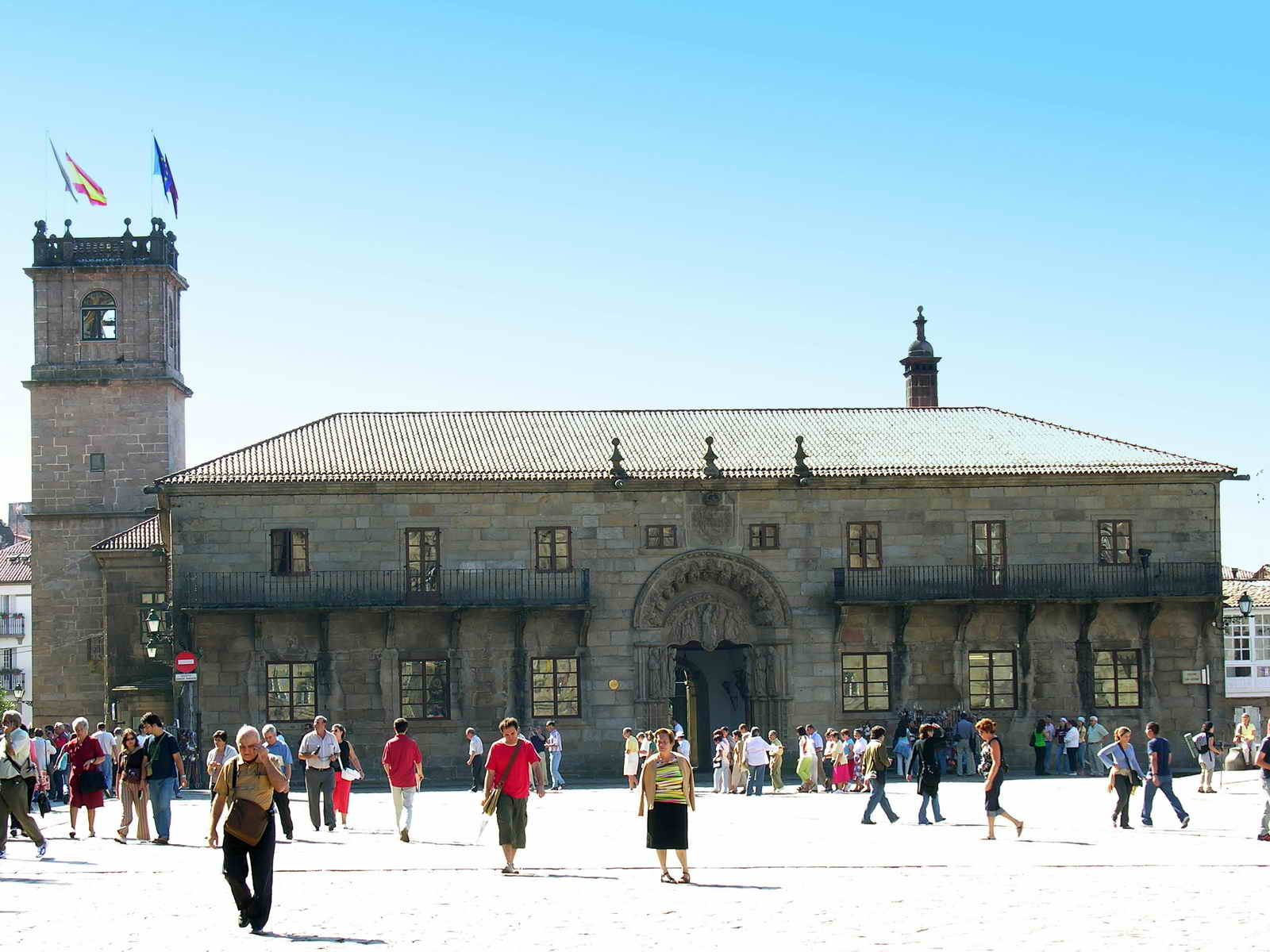
Façade

Colexio de San Xerome (in Spanish Colegio de San Jerónimo) is a civil building in Santiago de Compostela, Galicia, Spain. Founded in 1501, it's located on the southern side of Praza do Obradoiro.

== History ==
It was founded by then Archbishop of Santiago de Compostela Alonso III de Fonseca as a colexio menor (an institution in Spain during the Middle Ages and Renaissance serving as a preparatory step for those who intended to continue their studies at a university), and was originally located near the monastery of San Martiño Pinario. Towards the middle of the 17th century, the Benedictine friars of San Martiño bought the property to expand the monastery, and the school was moved to a new building in Praza do Obradoiro. The Romanesque entrance of the old school was installed at its main façade.

The building stopped functioning as a colexio menor in 1840, and during most part of the 20th century it served as a Teaching School. Since the 1980s, and together with the Fonseca palace, it houses the Rectorate of the University of Santiago de Compostela.
