= Gloria Fernández Fernández =

Spanish painter

- Born: 1913; Monforte de Lemos, Spain
- Died: 1996 (aged 82–83); Madrid, Spain
- Known for: Painting

Gloria Fernández Fernández was a Spanish painter born in Monforte de Lemos in 1913. She died in Madrid in 1996. She is included in the Bibliography of Galician Painters. Gloria has exhibited in the Spanish cities of Monforte de Lemos, A Coruña, Santiago de Compostela, Vigo and Madrid. Her work includes still lifes, flowers, portraits, and human figures. She was featured in an extensive exhibit of her works at the Provincial Museum of Lugo. The exhibition and her work are featured in a catalog of the exhibition that includes information about her evolution as an artist. Gloria was one of the pillars of the Monforte de Lemos intellectual community in the 1960s and, according to M. Hermida Balado from her book Lemos: pequeña historia de un lugar con mucha historia, was one of the three notable painters of the province at that time.

== Individual exhibitions ==
- Provincial Museum of Lugo, Lyceum of Ourense, Photo Club de Vigo (1963)
- Association of Artists of A Coruña (1964)
- Hostal dos Reis Católicos. Santiago de Compostela (1965)
- Prado Athenaeum Salon, Madrid (1969)
- CAV Salon, Municipal Savings Bank of Vigo (1972)
- New Exhibition Hall of the CAV (1976)

== Group exhibitions ==
- XV Exhibition of Culture and Art. Circle of Arts. Lugo (1956)
- XVI Exhibition of Culture and Art. Circle of Arts. Lugo (1957)
- Monforte de Lemos painters (with C. Cortés and M. Bosch). Youth Radio of Monforte. Monforte de Lemos (1958)
- XVII Drawing and Painting Exhibition. Provincial Union Delegation. Lugo (1958)
- XVII Culture and Art Exhibition. Circle of Arts. Lugo (1959)
- 1st Painting Exhibition (with M. Bosch, Celia Cortés and Juán Nuevo). Monforte Casino. Monforte de Lemos (1959)
- XXXIV Autumn Salon. Retiro Palace. Madrid (1963)
- Galician artists. Lugo Casino. Lugo (1965)
- XXXVI Autumn Salon. Retiro Palace. Madrid (1965)
- Current Lugo painting. Sala da Caixa de Aforros de A Coruña e Lugo. Lugo (1966)
- XXXVII Madrid Autumn Salon (1966)
- Spring Culture Weeks in the Province of Lugo. Ministry of Information and Tourism. by Chantada, Monforte, Ribadeo e Viveiro (1966)
- 1st Regional Art Biennial in Pontevedra (1970)
- 1st National Biennial of Art of Pontevedra (1971)
- IV Outdoor Art Exhibition. Vigo (1971)
- Galician artists. Victoria Circle. Monforte de Lemos (1971)

== Posthumous exhibitions ==
- The Memory of Gloria Fernández. Commercial Center of the Lemos Region, Monforte (2001)
- A retrospective 1945–1996, Museo Provincial de Lugo (2008)

== Awards ==
- 2nd Prize of the IX Provincial Exhibition of Painting Art in Lugo (1950)
- 2nd Prize in Painting at the XIV Provincial Art Exhibition, Lugo (1955)
- 2nd Prize Painting in the XV Provincial Art Exhibition, Lugo (1956)
- 1st prize for painting at the XVI Provincial Art Exhibition (Lugo, 1957)
- Extraordinary Mention of Painting, XVII Provincial Exhibition (1958)
- Extraordinary mention in the XVIII Provincial Art Exhibition, Lugo (1959)
- Special mention for her work at the XIX Provincial Art Exhibition (Lugo, 1960)
- 3rd medal at the Madrid Autumn Salon (1963)
