= Plaza del Obradoiro =

Square in Santiago di Compostela, Spain

Praza do Obradoiro
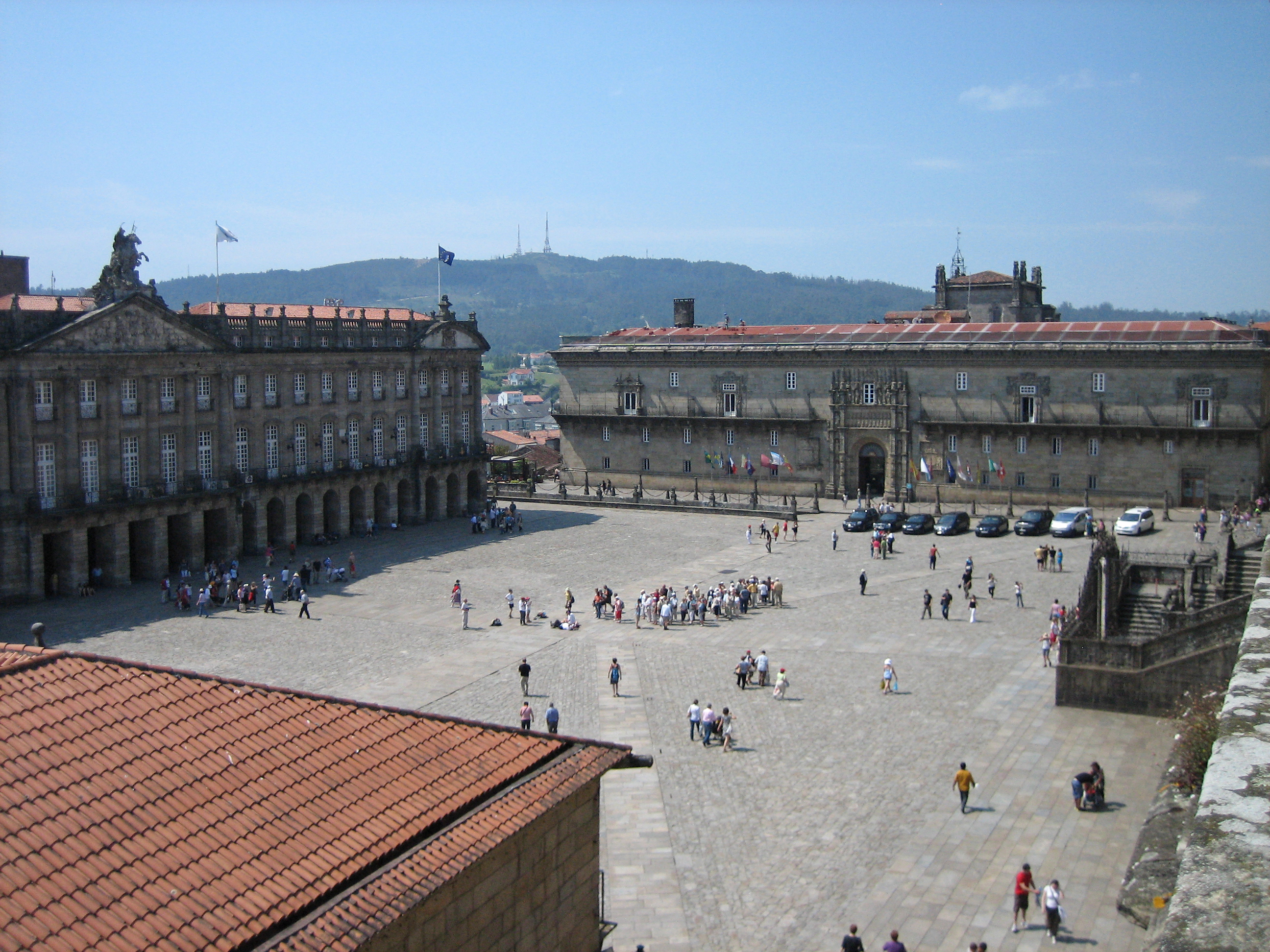
- Praza do Obradoiro view on a sunny day
- Interactive map of Praza do Obradoiro
- Native name: Praza do Obradoiro (Galician)
- Type: Plaza
- Location: Santiago de Compostela, Spain
- Coordinates: 42.8806°N 8.5458°W

The Praza do Obradoiro (Spanish: Plaza del Obradoiro, English: Square of the Workshop) is main square of the Santiago de Compostela old town, although not placed at the real centre. It lies to the West of the main façade of the Santiago de Compostela Cathedral, and thus the Pórtico da Gloria must be crossed to get into the building from the square. It is surrounded by four important buildings, said to represent the four powers of the city: the aforementioned Santiago de Compostela cathedral to the East (the Church), Hostal dos Reis Católicos (the doctors and bourgeoisie) to the North, Pazo de Raxoi (the government; after the Spanish transition to democracy was seat for the President of the Xunta of Galicia, nowadays the city council) to the West and the Colexio de San Xerome (the university) to the South. Once being crossed by cars, now is mainly pedestrian as the rest of the old town, with only traffic for taxis and (un)loading delivery lorries.

The floor is decorated by eight rays starting from the center, where a plaque commemorates the World Heritage Site pilgrims' way of Camiño de Santiago, whose final target is around here.

== Significance of the Plaza ==
The monumental center of Santiago de Compostela witnesses the history of an ancient city: Praza do Obradoiro (a word that describes the work place of the craftsmen) is one of the most beautiful and renowned squares in Spain and the monumental center of the ancient city of Santiago de Compostela. It comprises several emblematic buildings of the city, spectators of exception its long history, that fuse different architectural styles of various epochs, such as Baroque, Gothic, Renaissance or Neoclassical, collecting the cultural legacy of more than 700 years of history.

The buildings that delimit precisely this Square of the Obradoiro are the Palace of Rajoy, that closes for its western part just in front of the main facade of the Cathedral of Santiago (the most photographed image of the city); The Hostal de los Reyes Católicos and finally the San Jerónimo College, now the seat of the rectorate of the University of Santiago. The four emblematic buildings of this square have a meaning that transcends time and even today is fully valid. They are based on the four pillars of the Galician capital: religion, attention to the pilgrim, public administration and university education. Even today these buildings continue to perform these four functions in the day-to-day compostelano of the 21st century.

The Praza do Obradoiro also has a very deep symbolism as it is the end of the Camino de Santiago for most of the pilgrims, hundreds of kilometers behind them; The arrival box after a long trip to Santiago. Entering from Obradoiro Square to Santiago Cathedral through the Portico de la Gloria, Maestro Mateo is one of the most awaited experiences for all pilgrims, a ritual that has been fulfilled every day for hundreds of years by millions of pilgrims coming from all over the world. The Obradoiro is a place of joy and incessant hustle and bustle, both of the pilgrims who finally reach their goal and of the numerous groups that come to Santiago to visit its imposing monumental heritage.

== Gallery ==
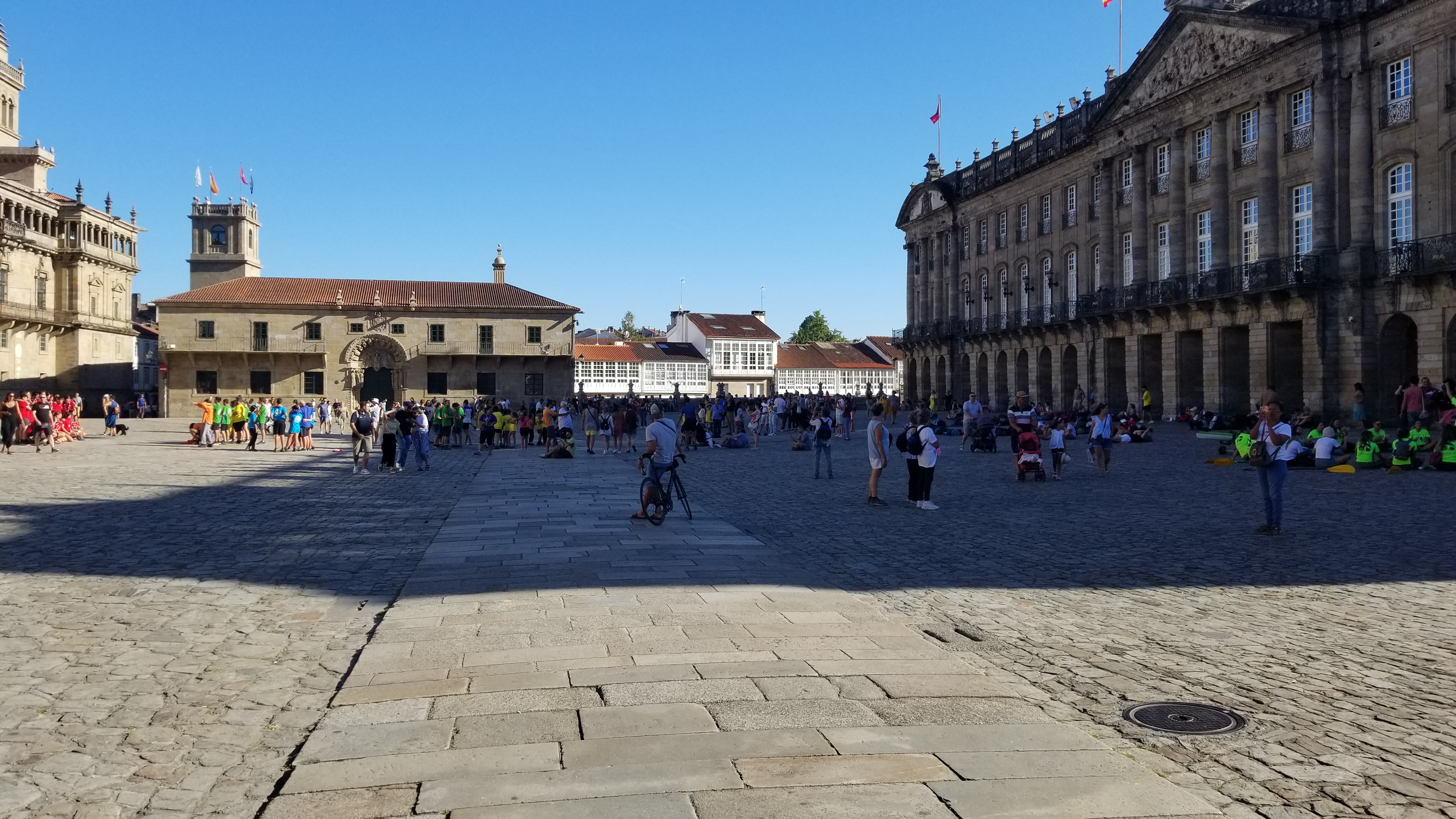
Plaza do Obradoiro as viewed from the Hostal dos Reis Catolicos. The Santiago de Compostela Cathedral is on the left. Large groups of pilgrims clap and celebrate their completion of the Camino de Santigo upon entering the Plaza and congregate in the square, as seen in this image

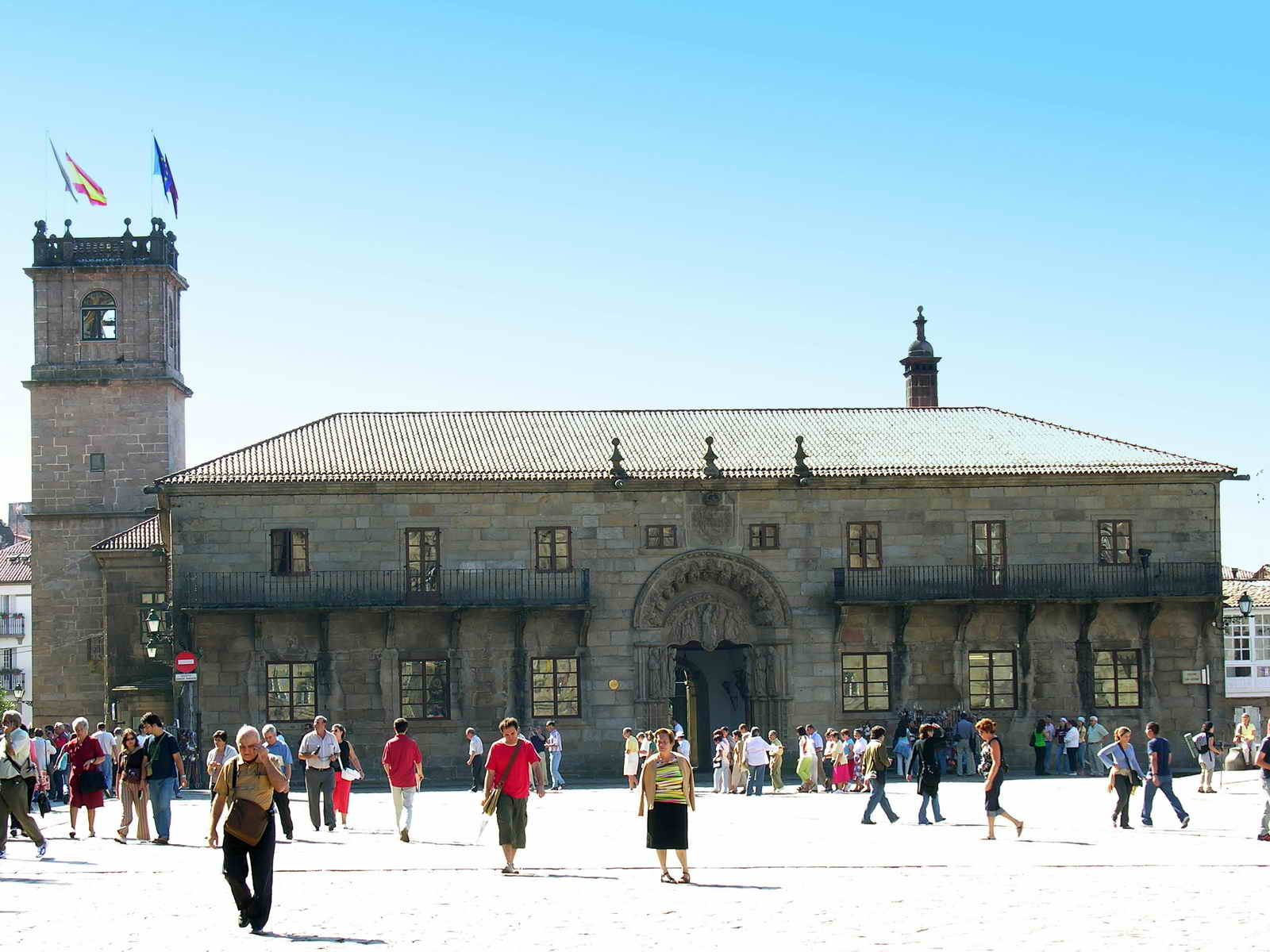
(S) Colexio de San Xerome

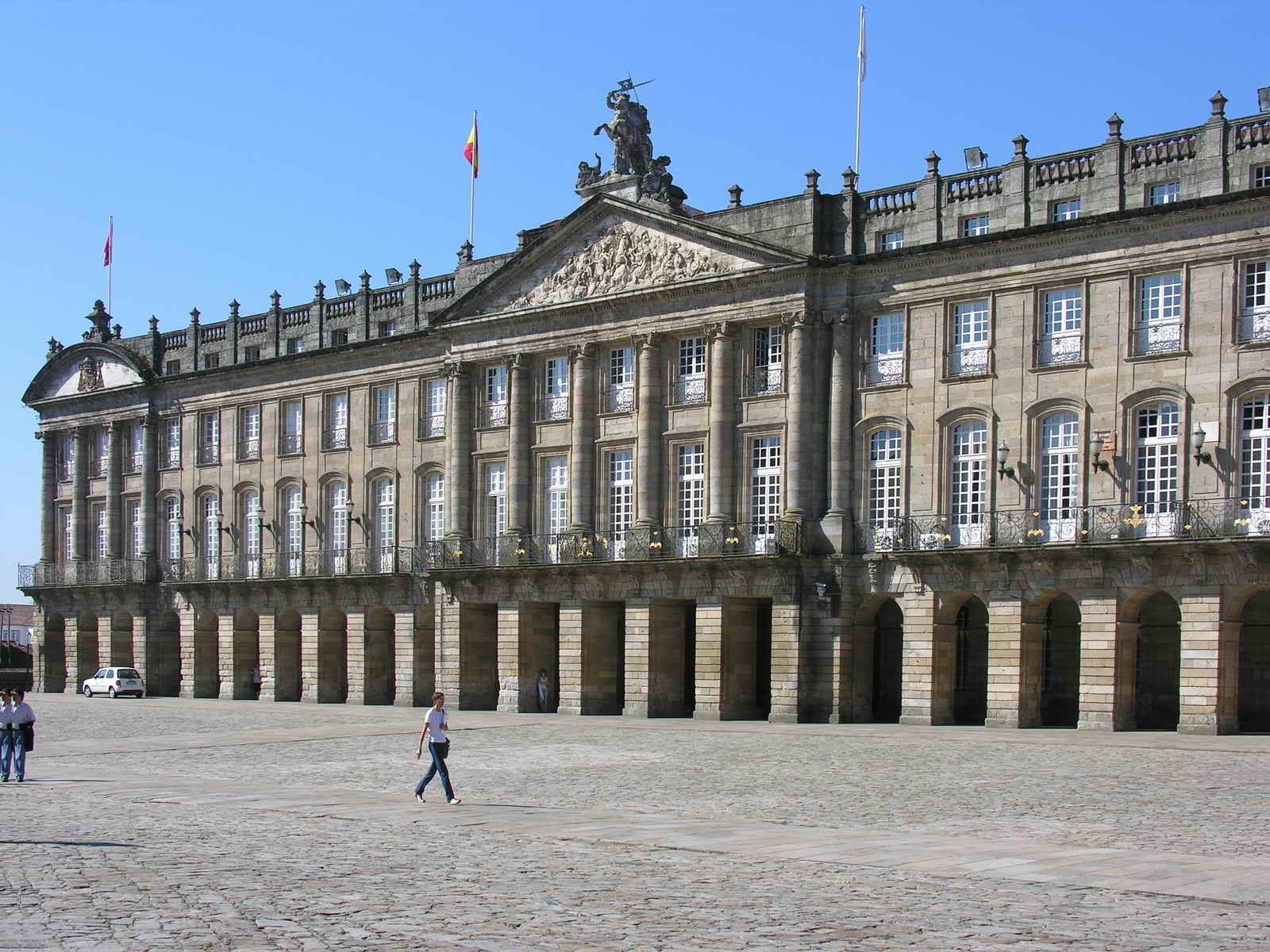
(W) Pazo de Raxoi

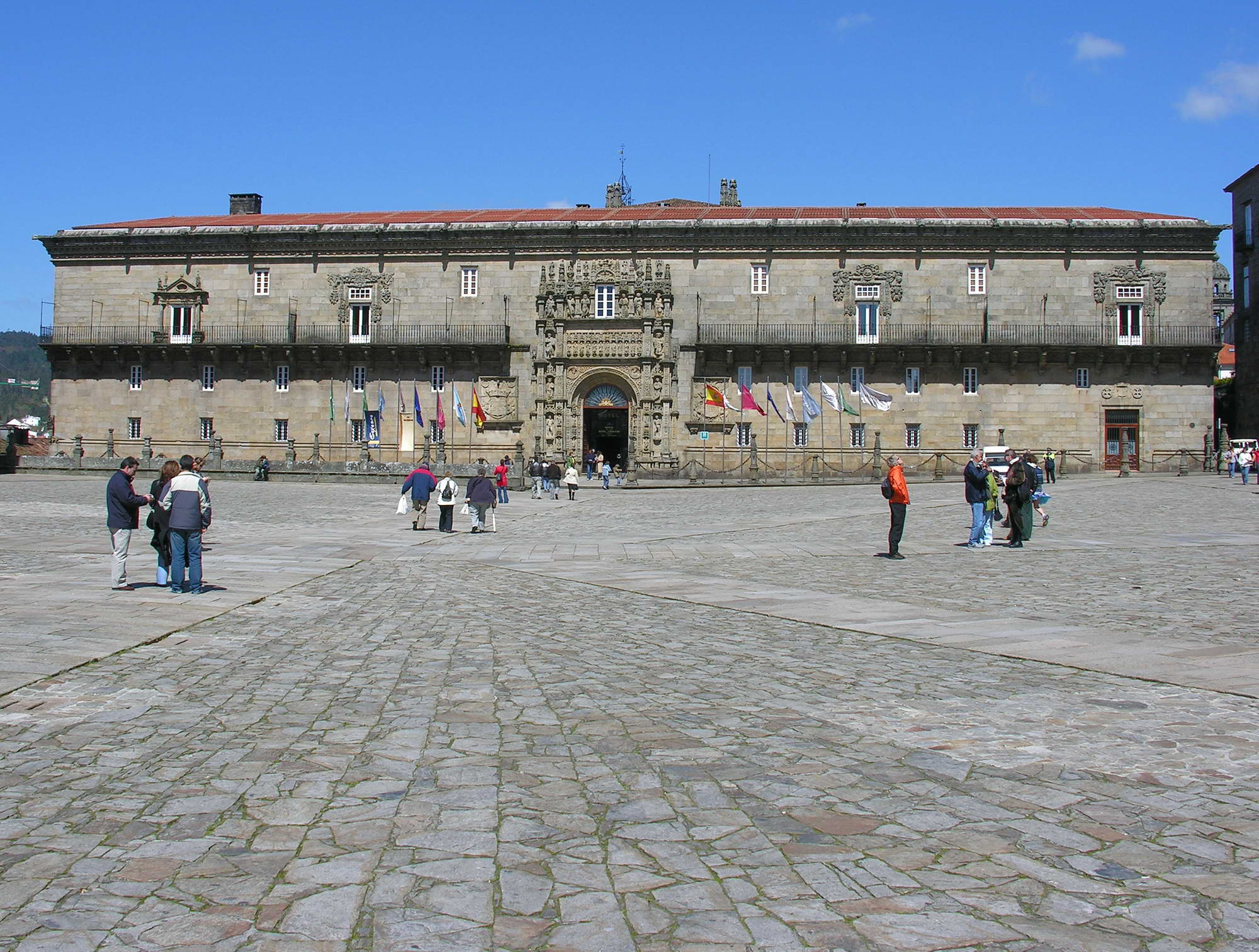
(N) Hostal dos Reis Católicos

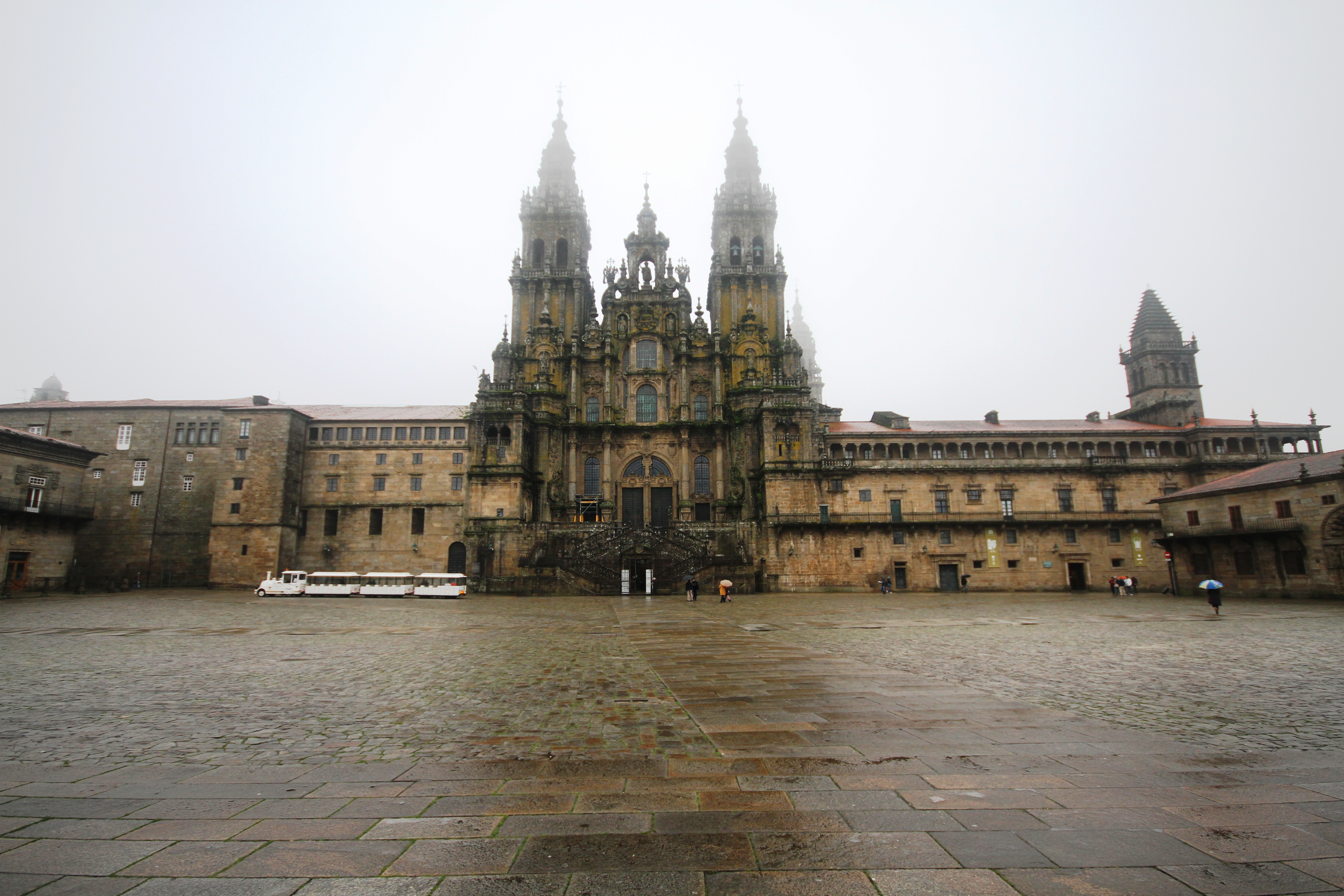
(E) Santiago de Compostela Cathedral
