= Pazo de Raxoi =

Palace in Santiago de Compostela, Galicia, Spain

Coordinates: 42°52′50″N 8°32′46″W

Palace of Raxoi
- Pazo de Raxoi
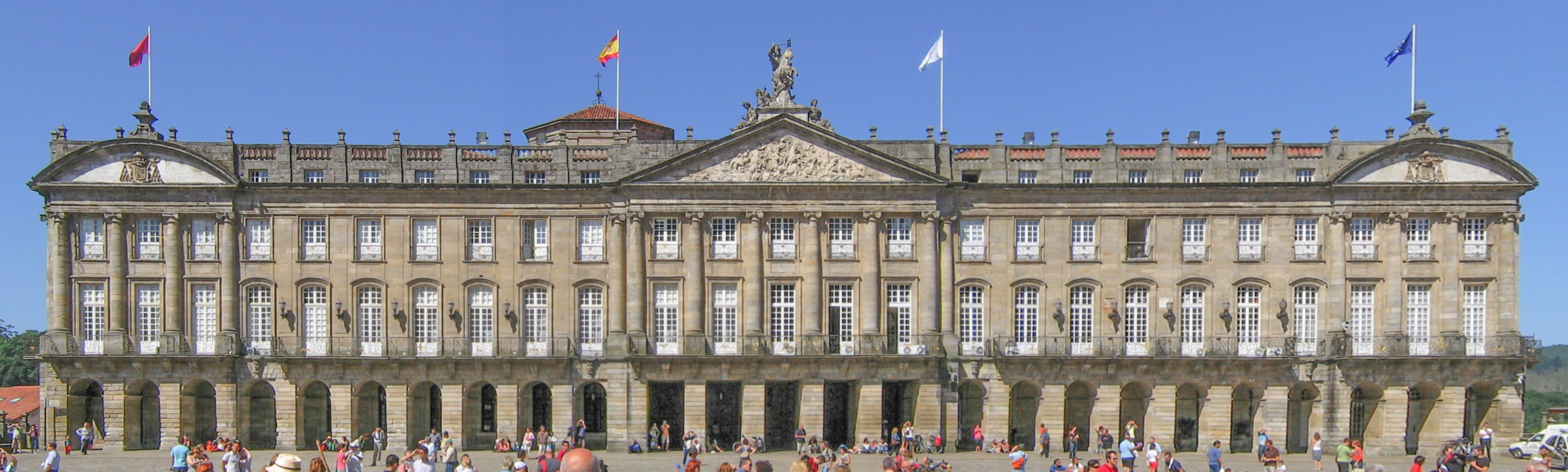
- Facade of the building from the Obradoiro square.
- Interactive map of the Palace of Raxoi area

General information
- Architectural style: Neoclassical
- Location: Santiago de Compostela, Galicia, Spain
- Year built: 1766-1772

Design and construction
- Architect: Carlos Lemaur

The Palace of Raxoi (Galician: Pazo de Raxoi; Spanish: Palacio de Rajoy) is a neoclassical building located in the Obradoiro square in Santiago de Compostela, Galicia, Spain. Completed in 1772 by French architect Carlos Lemaur, it houses the city hall and the presidency of the Regional Government of Galicia.

== Background ==
The building is one of the best examples of neoclassical architecture in Galicia. Its construction was ordered by the archbishop of Santiago, Bartolomé Raxoi Losada, in 1766 with the purpose of serving as a seminary for confessors. The French engineer Carlos Lemaur was responsible for the work. On its façade you can see a representation of the battle of Clavijo and a sculpture of the apostle Santiago.

The palace is located in the western part of the Plaza del Obradoiro, which closes on that side, in front of the main façade of the Cathedral of Santiago de Compostela. To its right is the College of San Jerónimo, which today serves as the headquarters of the Rectorate of the University of Santiago; to the left of the palace is the Royal Hospital of the Catholic Monarchs, currently part of the network of National Paradores of Spain.

In 2015, when UNESCO approved the extension of the Camino de Santiago in Spain to «Roads of Santiago de Compostela: French Way and Routes of Northern Spain», Spain sent as documentation a «Retrospective Inventory - Associated Components» in which the Rajoy family palace appears at no. 912.

== History ==
The land on which Rajoy's palace was built was previously occupied by the city's civil and ecclesiastical prisons, and a section of the wall, which defended the city from the west. The double ownership of the property caused disagreements between the Bishopric and the City Council. The latter presented a project in 1764, authored by Lucas Ferro Caaveiro, with the idea of locating the Casa del Ayuntamiento between both prisons. For his part, the archbishop Bartolomé de Rajoy had in mind to place there the Seminary called Confessors and the residence for the children of the cathedral choir, for which he presented a different project, commissioned to Andrés García de Quiñones. However, in addition to the controversy between the co-owners, a third interested party emerged, the Royal Hospital, alleging that its property was being infringed. The ensuing dispute led to the intervention of the Capitanía General de Galicia and the Real Cámara, finally resolving, in a Solomonic manner on May 13, 1767, that the future building would house the Compostela Consistory, the Seminary of Confessors and the prisons, according to the project of the engineer Carlos Lemaur, as had been proposed by the said Captaincy General.

According to the previous resolution, the building was built according to Lemaur's plans, with the works directed by Friar Manuel de los Mártires, and the royal executors by the masters Juan López Freire and Alberto Ricoy, and, according to the inscription that appears on the frieze of the same palace, the works extended between 1766 and 1772.

The palace contributed to enhancing the Plaza del Obradoiro, which lacked a worthy building on that side, even though the imposing new western façade of the Compostela headquarters had been finished a few years earlier.

== Description ==
The building corresponds to a French palatial type developed by François Mansart, ultimately based on Italian models: long porticoed loggia, with cushioned perpiaños, on which the corresponding bodies rise, and embraced by a colossal order.

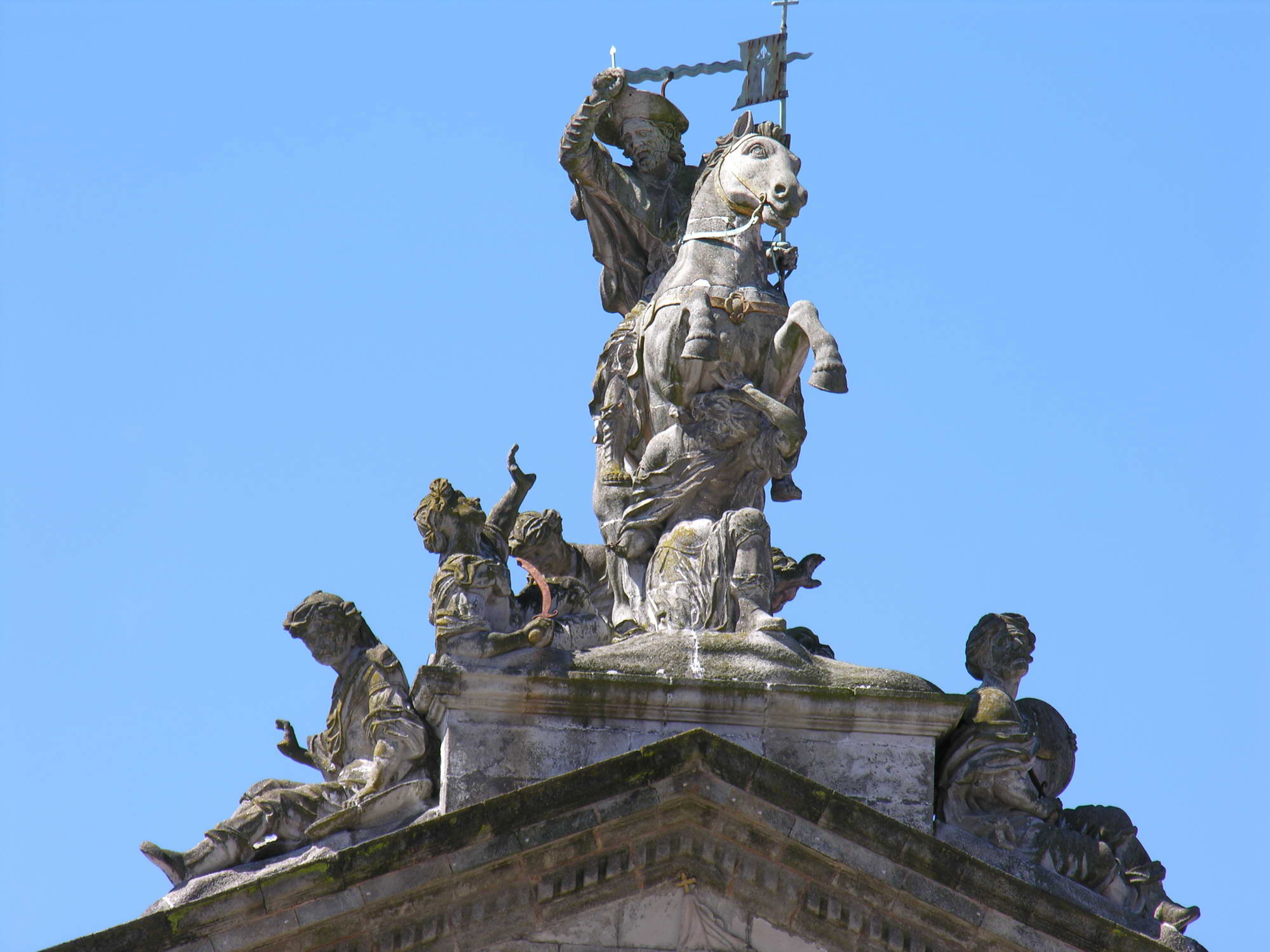
Santiago Matamoros, by José Ferreiro, on top of the central pediment of the Rajoy Palace.

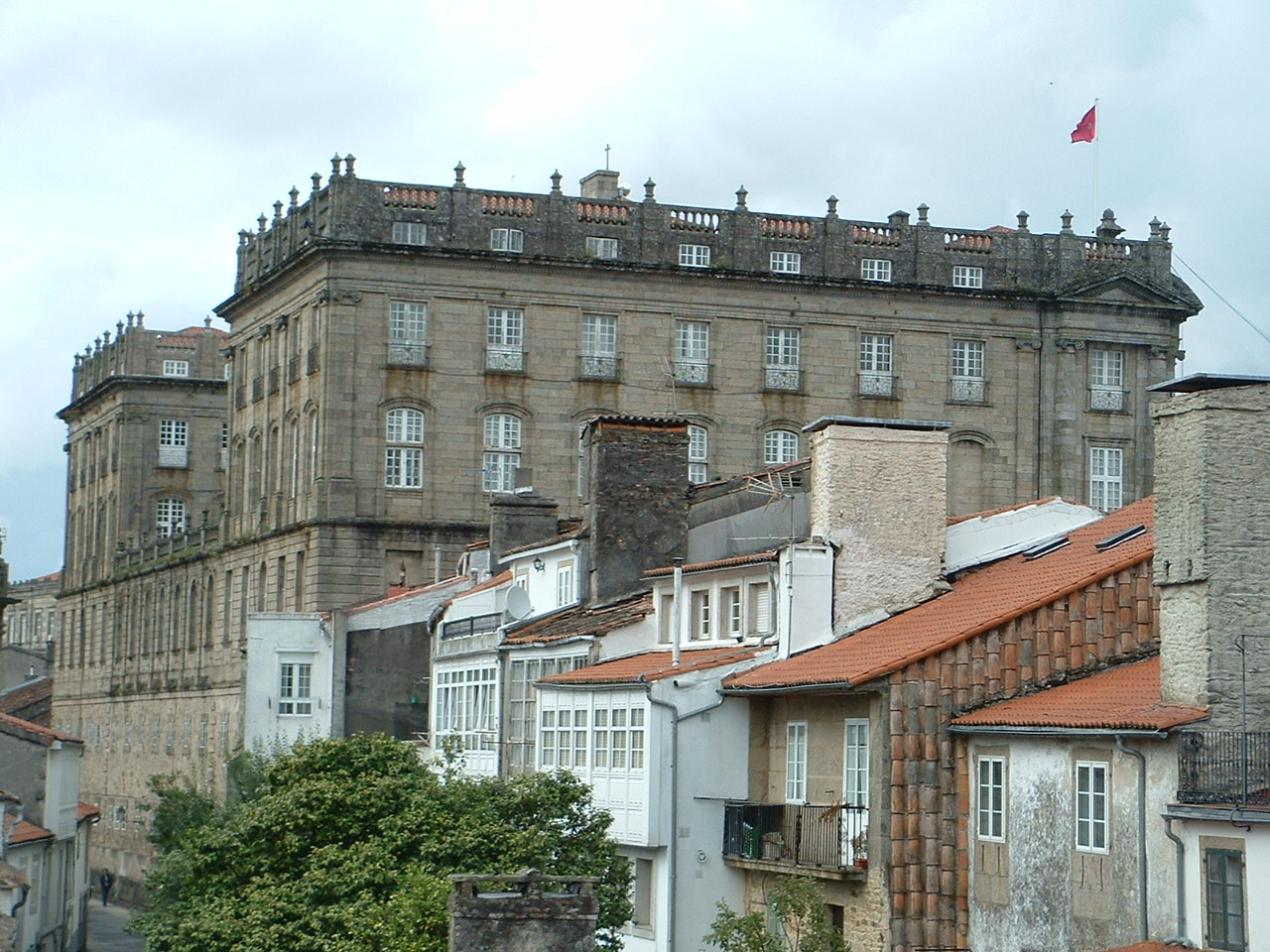
Rear facade of the Rajoy Palace.

The factory in Santiago de Compostela adjusted to this pattern. On a rectangular plan, horizontality predominates, with the almost 90 m long façade, barely broken by the acroteria and pediments of the crowning, which contrasts with the verticality of the cathedral façade. In the lower body, the portico stands out with twenty semicircular arches on the sides and five lintelled in the center. Above this loggia, two upper bodies develop, both established by attached columns of Giant order Ionic, which start, on a pedestal supported at the end of the portico. Between these colossal columns, fifty openings open, of door type in both cases, since through them you access the balcony that runs Send feedback Side panels History Saved
