= Monastery of San Martiño Pinario =

Monastery in Santiago de Compostela, Galicia, Spain

- Mosteiro de San Martiño Pinario
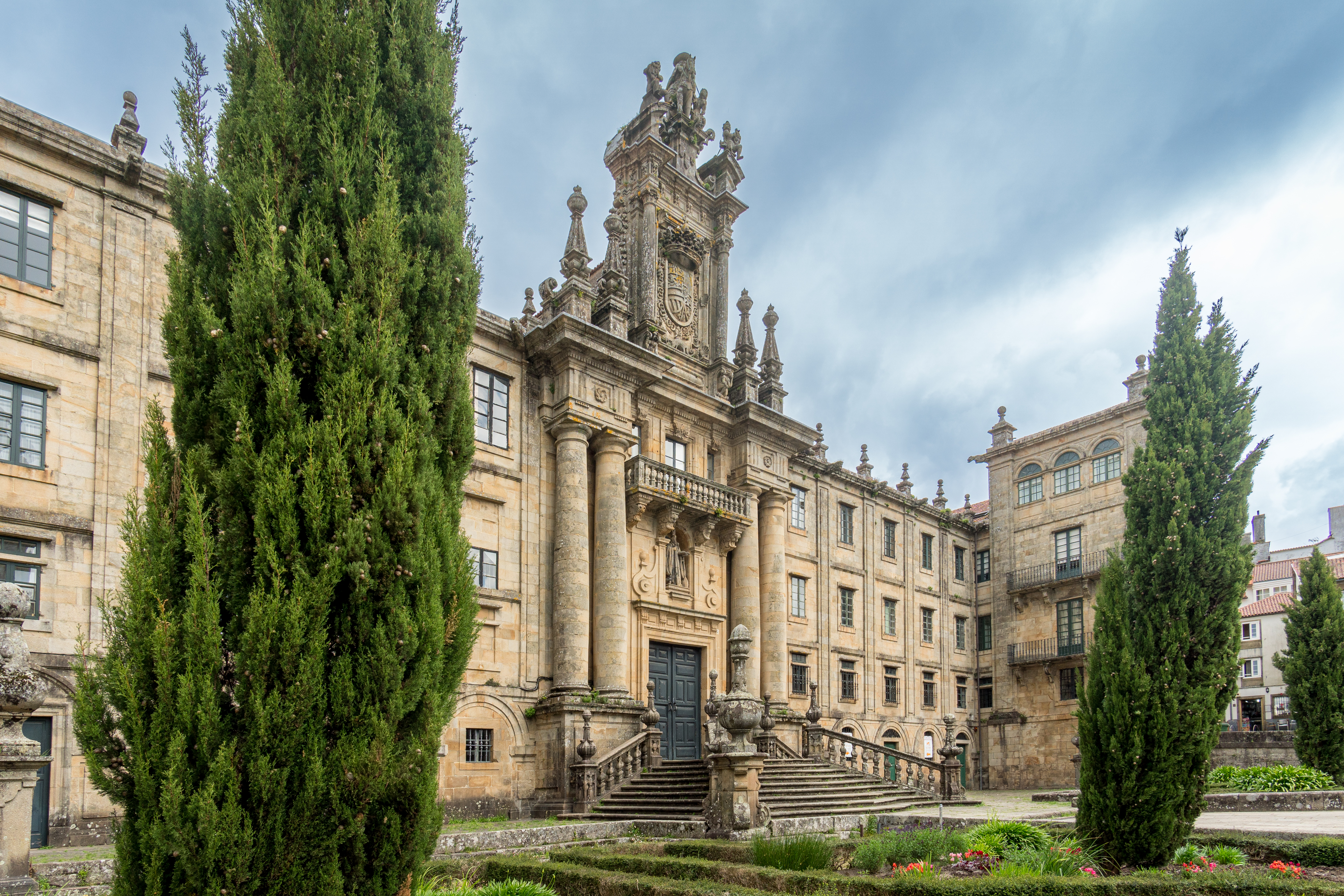
- Facade of the monastery.

- Location within Spain

Religion
- Affiliation: Catholic

Location
- Location: Santiago de Compostela, Galicia
- Country: Spain
- Coordinates: 42°52′55″N 8°32′40″W

Architecture
- Style: Renaissance, Baroque, Neoclassical

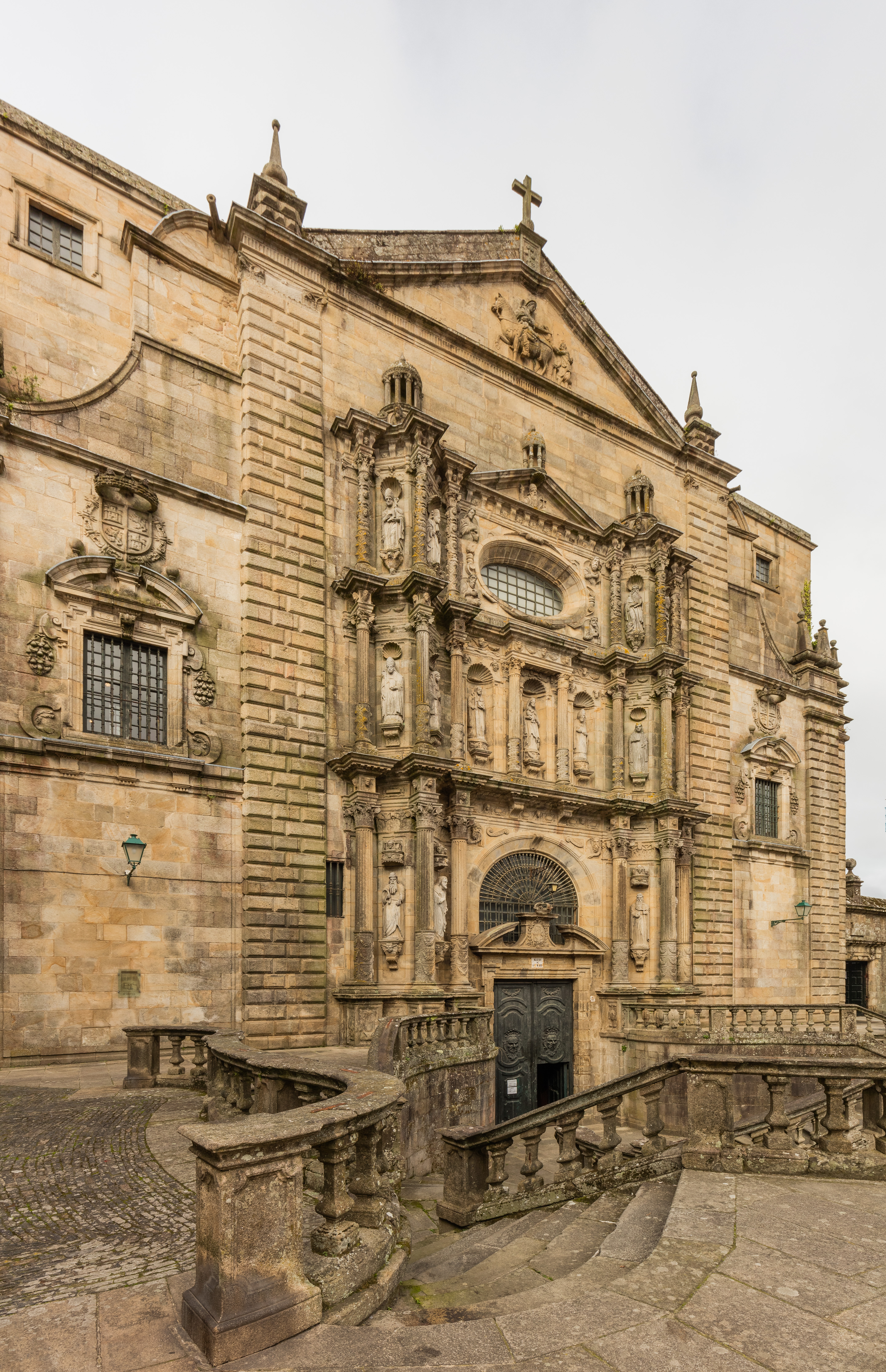
Main entrance to the church.

The monastery of San Martiño Pinario (San Martín Pinario in Castilian) was a Benedictine monastery in the city of Santiago de Compostela, Galicia, Spain, the second largest monastery in Spain after San Lorenzo de El Escorial.

Little remains of the original medieval buildings, as the monastery has been largely rebuilt since the sixteenth century. The monastery was closed in the nineteenth century during the Ecclesiastical Confiscations of Mendizábal. The buildings currently house a seminary.

== History ==
The monastery originated in a chapel dedicated to Santa Maria called the Corticela, which was demolished in the late ninth century, except the chapel, which today is part of the Santiago de Compostela Cathedral, when Alfonso III of Asturias and the Bishop Sisnando began the new cathedral construction. Thus, around the year 899, this monastery was built where Benedictine monks moved from the old chapel. This monastery was later replaced by another monastery whose church was consecrated in 1102 by Bishop Diego Gelmírez, but not much remains of that era.

Throughout the Middle Ages the monastery grew so that by the end of the fifteenth century the monastery became the richest and most powerful of Galicia. This brought about the almost complete reconstruction starting in the sixteenth century. From that century it was the most powerful monastery in Galicia, administering control over most Galician monasteries.

The current church began to be erected soon after the appointment of Juan de Sanclemente Torquemada as Archbishop of Santiago in 1587. The project was commissioned to Mateo López, the most outstanding monastic architect of the city. After the death of López in 1606, Benito González de Araujo assumed the direction of the work.

The facade of the church, oriented to the west and open to the square of San Martín, presents a cover with structure of great altarpiece of stone divided in three bodies and three streets separated by fluted columns and is dedicated to the exaltation of the Virgin Mary and of the Benedictine order.

The fronton finish has a relief of Saint Martin on horseback distributing his coat with a poor, patron of the convent.

Its present aspect is due, in addition to the initial design of Mateo López, to subsequent interventions. Thus, in the 17th century Peña del Toro enlarged it adding two towers to the sides, which did not rise above the church by the opposition of the cathedral chapter, and opening two side windows, adorned with the first fruit strings of the Baroque Compostelan, antecedent of what would later be used profusely by Domingo de Andrade in the Clock Tower of the cathedral and in the Casa de la Parra of the Plaza de La Quintana.

With the seizure in the year 1835 was devoted to various functions and since 1868 it became the seat of the seminary serving most of the Archdiocese of Santiago de Compostela.

== Architecture ==
=== Facade ===
The facade has an altarpiece structure and shows the figures of the Virgin and Child and saints Benedictine abbots. The Eternal Father chairs the triangular pediment. St. Martin of Tours completes the set on top with a classic representation: on horseback and dividing his cloak to shelter a beggar.

The main facade is oriented to the south and have front gardens that are the Plaza de la Inmaculada. It was designed by Gabriel de las Casas and her four Doric columns supporting an entablature with pinnacles. Above the door is a picture of San Benito, a large shield of Spain and San Martin riding high.

In 1738 Fernando de Casas y Novoa added a large rectangular comb with the Spanish shield, finishing the whole with another image of Saint Martin distributing his cape.

=== Church ===
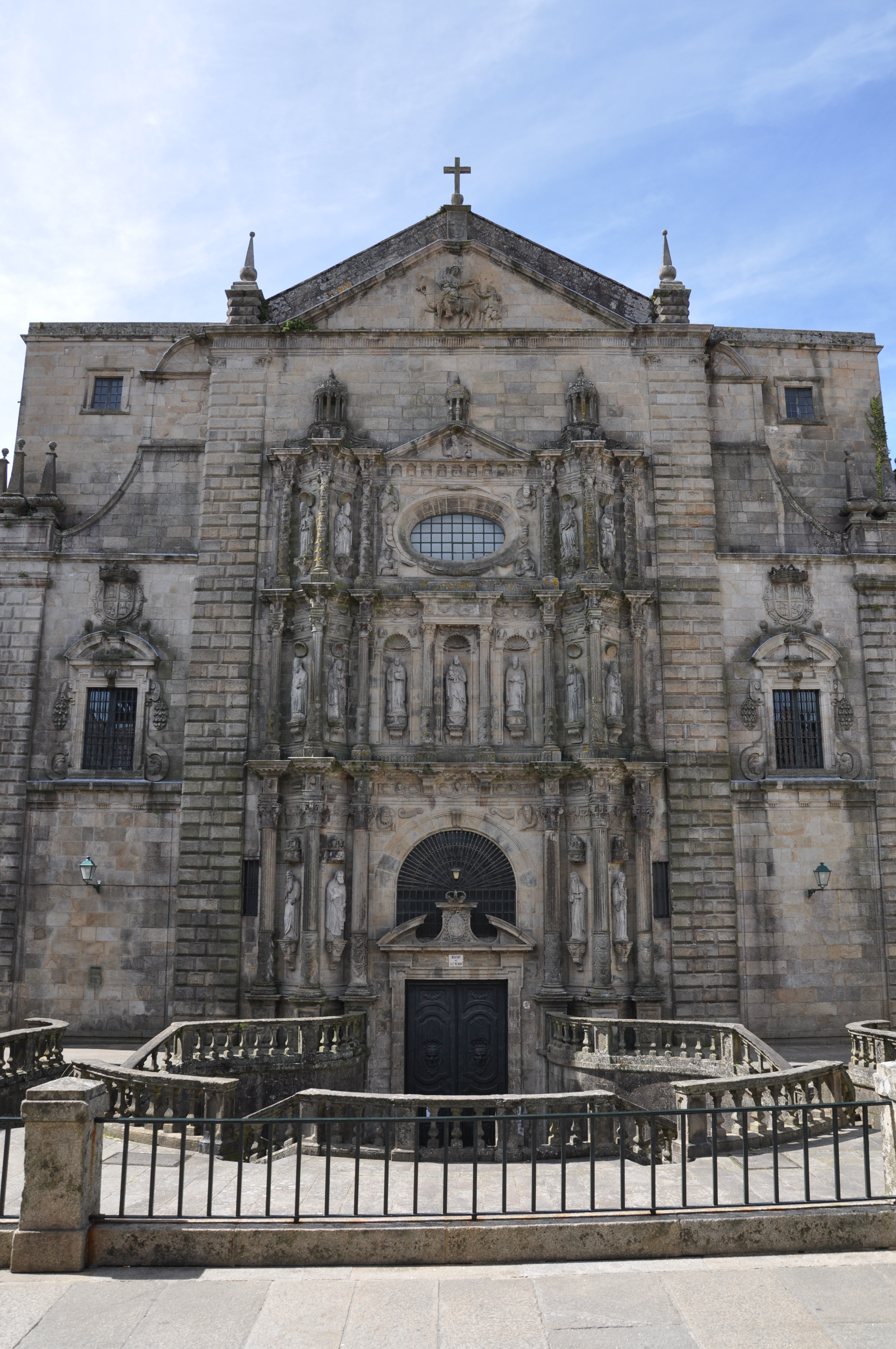
Facade of the church

The church, completed in 1652, is the work of Matthew Lopez and Gonzalez de Araújo and opens onto the square that bears the name of the monastery, which lowers her face. The plan of the church has a single nave covered with a barrel vault with lacunar false. Six side-chapels open onto the nave and communicate with each other and have the same kind of dome as the nave. The crossing is illuminated by a dome in half. The choir stalls, Baroque, is the work of Matthew de Prado and the three largest altar pieces, along with the Relief Chapel of the same temple, are the work of Fernando de Casas Novoa, creating here one of the most exquisite Baroque nationally and internationally.

Currently, this building has enabled part as a museum of religious art, which is accessed through the door of the church of St. Martin, and is distinguished as one of the best in the community. You can visit also the temple itself, the statio (sacristy), the sacristy, the former printing, the pharmacy, the chapel of the relics (theca) or the Renaissance choir of the Cathedral of Santiago de Compostela, and various collections of gold, ivory or liturgical vestments.

=== Cloisters ===
The monastery has two cloisters. The largest was built in 1636 by Bartolome Fernandez Lechuga (the author of the transept of the church), and continued by José Peña de Toro and Fernando Casas y Novoa, who finished in 1743.

The Cloister of the Offices

The Cloister of the Offices was started by Bartolomé Fernández Lechuga in 1626, continued by Peña del Toro and completed by Fernando de Casas y Novoa in 1743. It has a rectangular floor plan with six sections on the major sides and four on the smaller sides and two linked floors by matched columns.

Cloister of the Portería

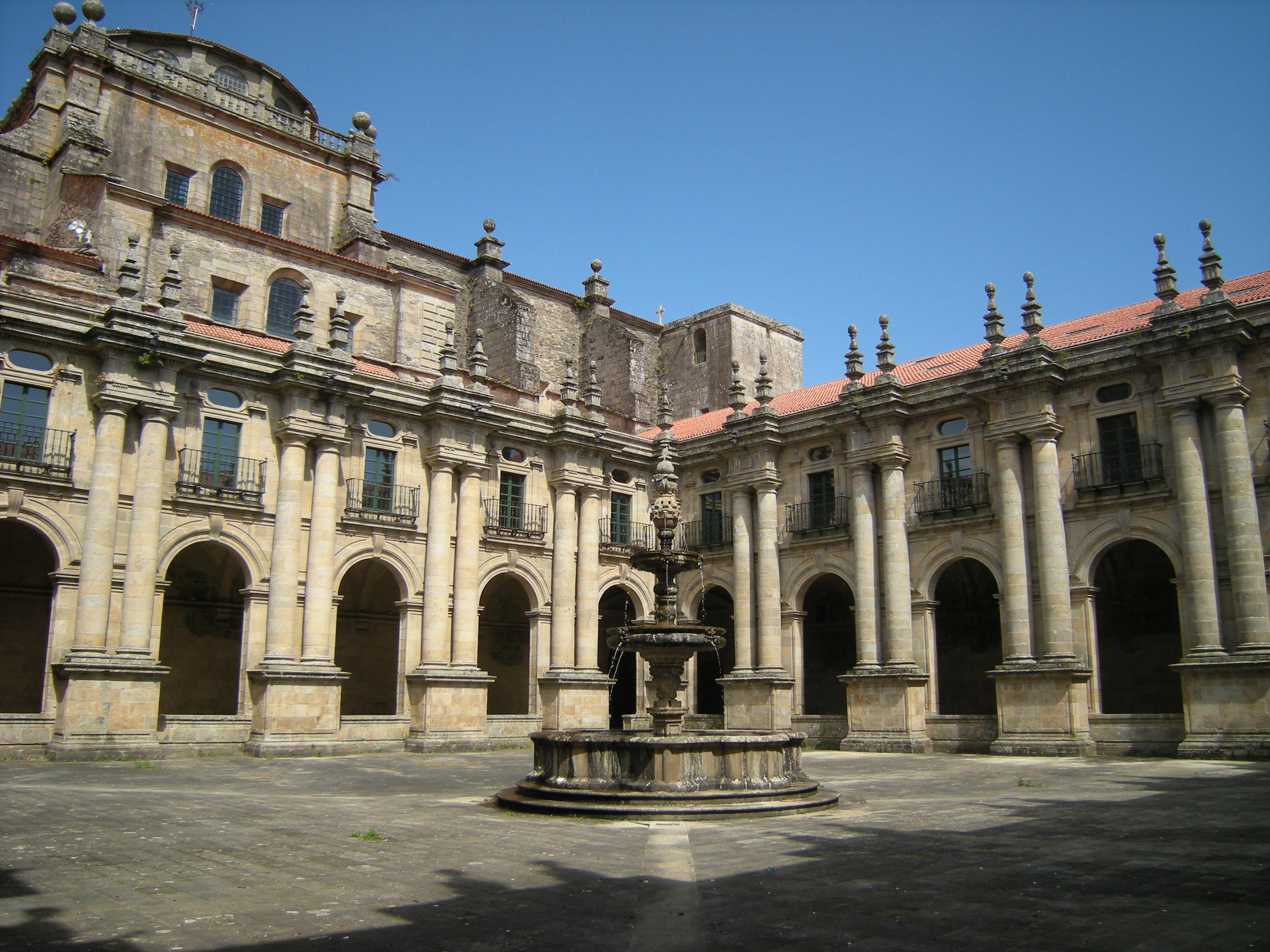
Cloister of the Portería

The Cloister of the Portería or Processions, the largest, began to be erected around 1633 on the side closest to the church. Although the project is attributed to Bartolomé Fernández Lechuga, they worked on it Peña del Toro or Miguel de Romay, also author of the bell tower. It has two floors united by double columns of giant Tuscan order that start of plinth. The first floor has semicircular arches and the second, by Friar Tomás Alonso, balconies flanked by double Doric columns. The whole is topped by a cornice with pinnacles.

The cloisters are not part of the visitable route, although as the headquarters of the Social Work School, it may be possible to visit during the academic period.

=== Interior ===
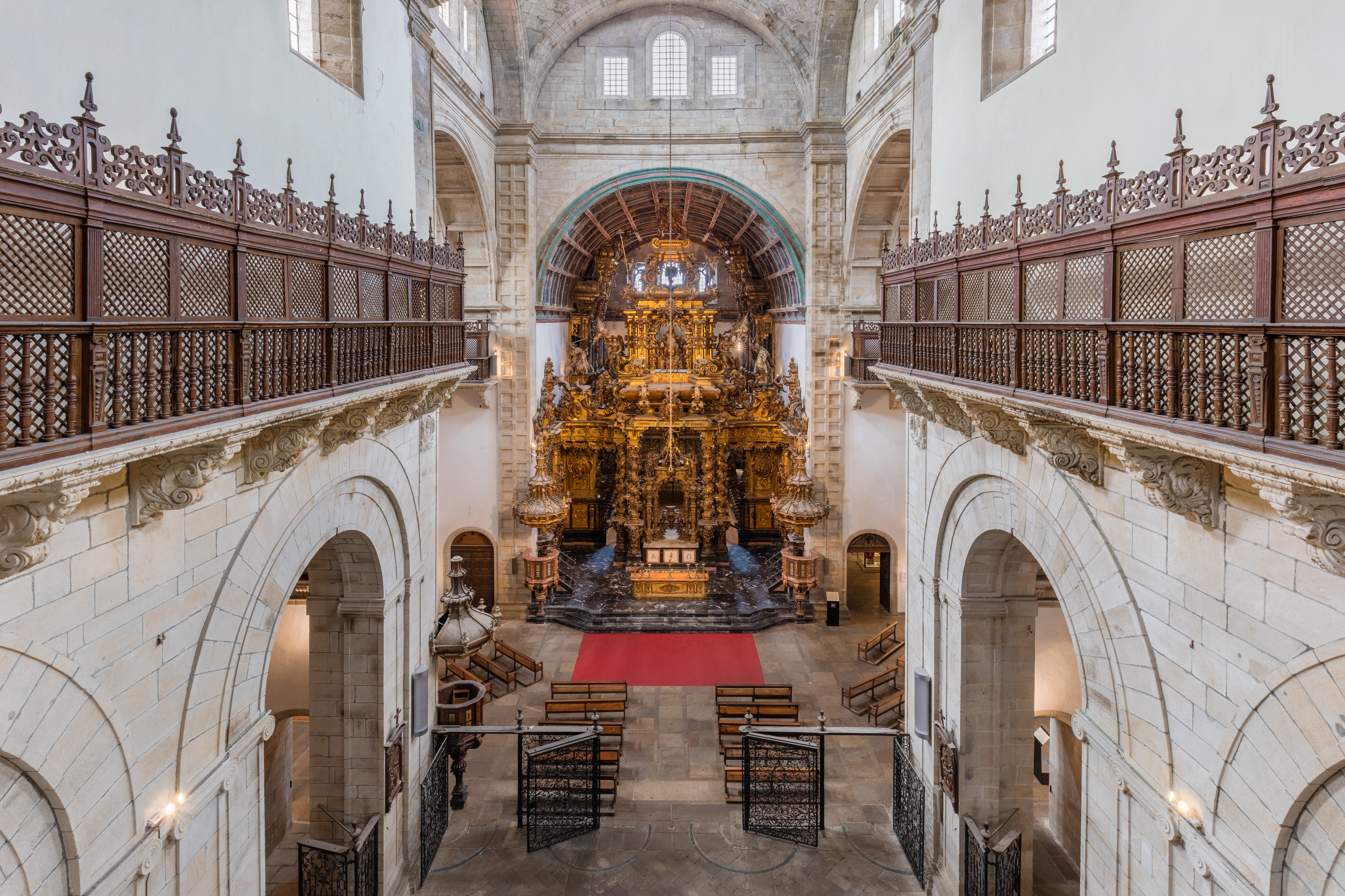
Main nave view from the entrance of the church.

The interior is conformed with a Latin cross plan with a rectangular headboard flanked by rectangular spaces that could have been designed as sacristies, single nave covered with barrel vault of false casetas that mask the nerves and three lateral chapels on each side communicated to each other by means of Arches of half point and with equal cover that the nave.

=== Staircase ===
In addition, in 1771 Friar Manuel de los Mártires designed, with the execution of Friar Plácido Caamiña, an intervention that consisted of lowering the level of the door with respect to that of the square, leaving the upper part of the former converted into stained glass, and incorporating a descending staircase with an effective mix of curves and countercurves that create an interesting perspective game.

=== Main chapel ===
The main chapel is of rectangular plan and covered of vault of canon casetonada. It has a Baroque walnut stall and an exalted altarpiece that, along with the sides in the arms of the cruise, get one of the sets of Baroque peninsular.

=== Choir stalls ===
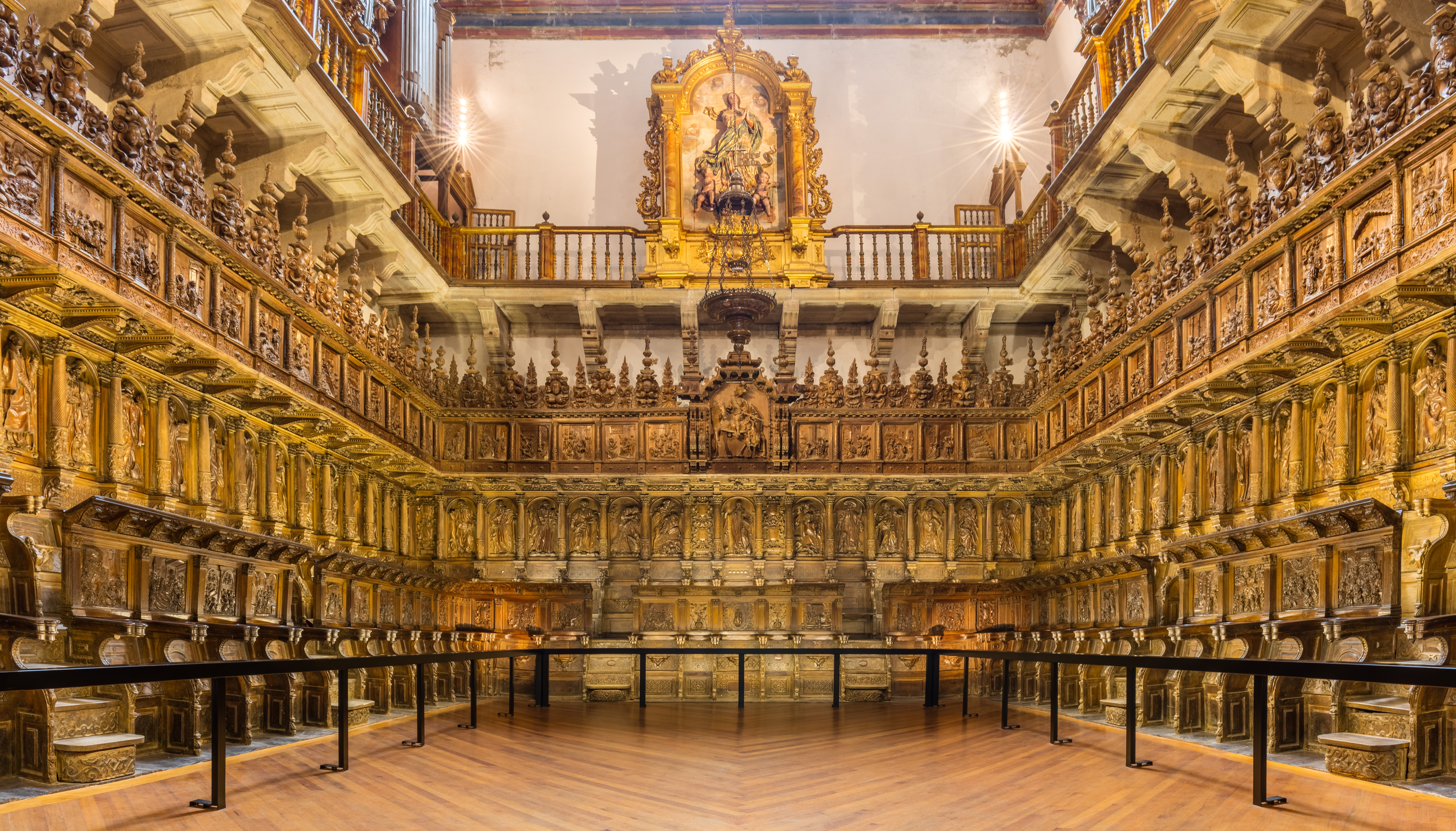
Choir of the church.

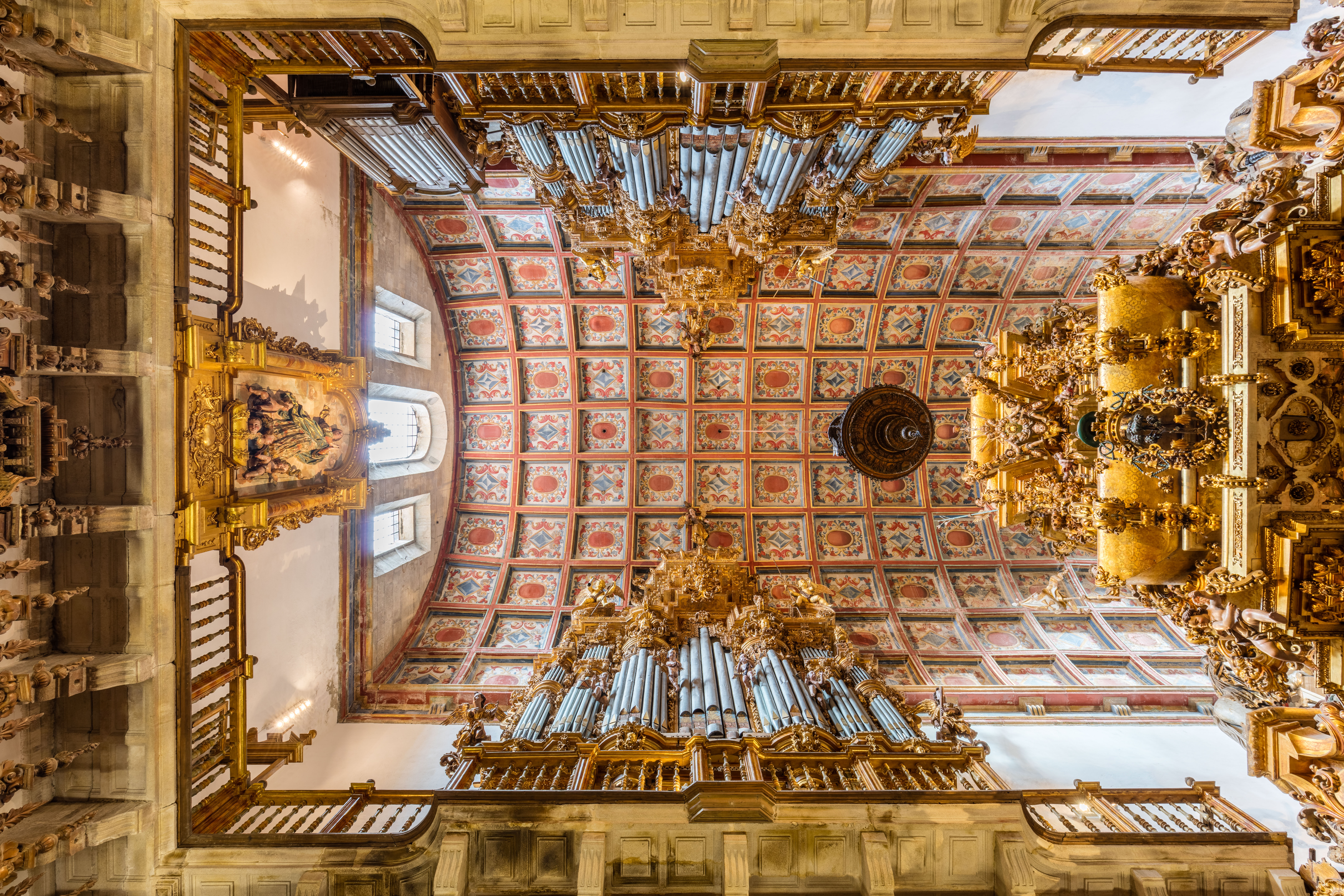
Ceiling over the choir.

The choir stalls was realized by Mateo de Prado between 1639 and 1647 and it denotes influence of Gregorio Fernández, the engravings of the Roman edition of 1579 of Vita et miracula sanctissimi patris Benedicti and of the choir of the cathedral that, paradoxically, at the moment also can be admired in San Martiño, located in the high choir of the church. The crest was designed by Diego de Romay in 1673. The iconography supposes the exaltation of the Virgin Mary as a destroyer of the sin of the world and in relation to the dogma of the Immaculate Conception, of which the Benedictine order was a great defender.

=== Main altarpiece ===
One of the most striking features of the main altarpiece is its double function as a double-faced retable-baldachin, one towards the nave and another towards the choir of the monastic community. It is organized by two bodies with profuse decoration in gold leaf, with salomonic columns, scrolls, pearls, acanthus leaves, small vegetal decoration ... and its iconographic discourse is articulated around the Assumption and Coronation of the Virgin.

=== Lateral reredos ===
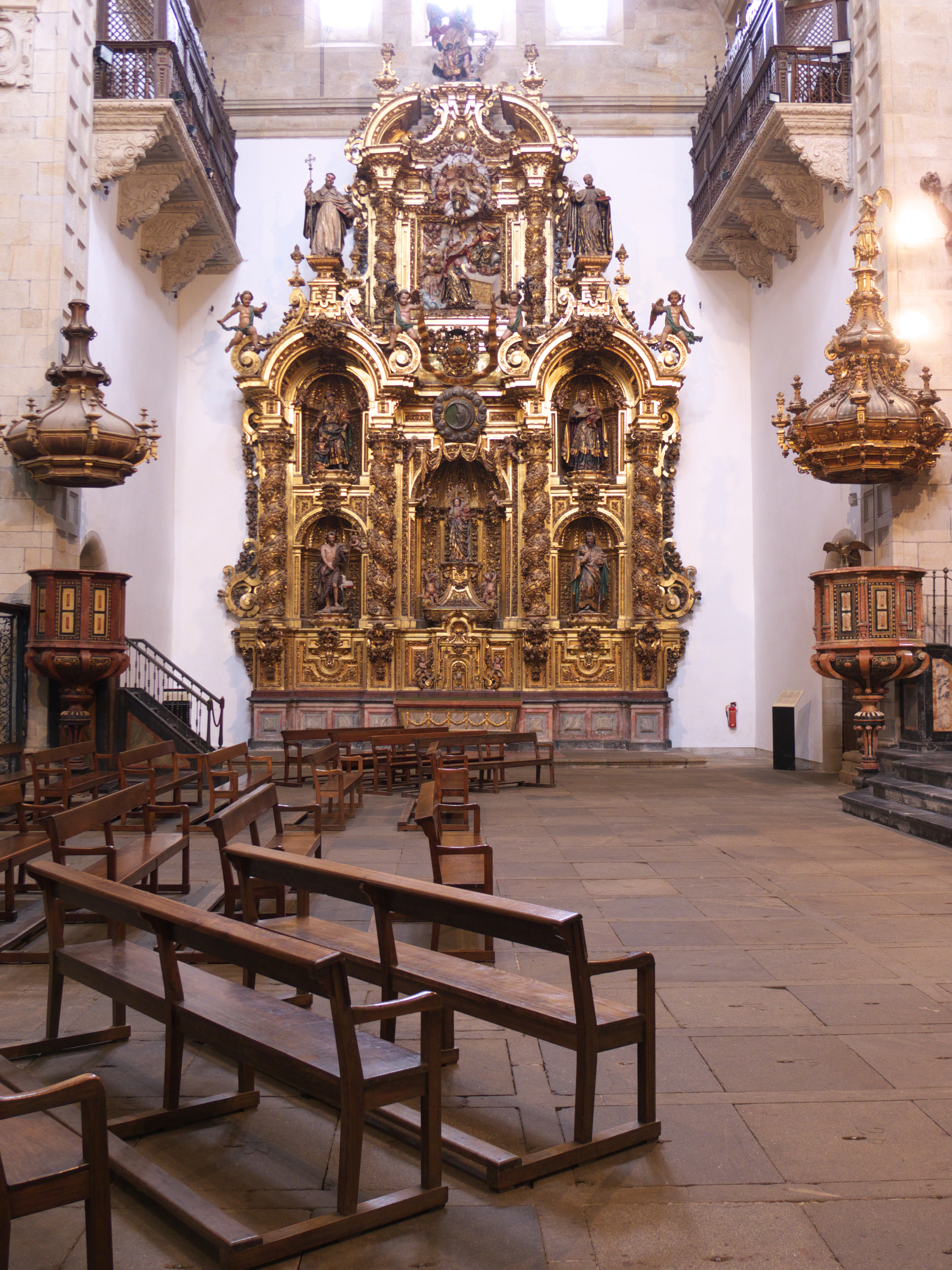
Reredos of la Virgen Inglesa.

The lateral altarpieces, placed in the ends of the arms of the transept, are dedicated to Saint Benedict and the Virgen Inglesa, which receives that name because tradition says that the carving of the Virgin and Child presiding over the ensemble, dating from ha. 1500, was brought to Compostela by Catholics exiled from England at the time of Henry VIII; Are distributed in three streets and attic, with salomonic columns of giant order on a bank very developed. They present scrolls, fruit strings, corbels, ribbons and are topped by broken semicircular pediments from which a pyramidal shape emerges.

The crossing was covered by Bartolomé Fernández Lechuga with a dome ribbed on pediments without drum and with twelve windows at the start that give the sensation that it is floating in the air, conforming the favorite field for burial.

The nave has a balcony flown running from the high choir to the cruise supported by corbels with vegetal and anthropomorphic decoration of questioned authorship, as some authors relate it to Friar Tomás Alonso, since the corbels are very similar to those made in the facade of the Hostal dos Reis Católicos, and others say that it is the work of Friar Gabriel de las Casas, who is known to be working in San Martín in 1685.

=== Chapels ===
All chapels show altarpieces added in the 18th century. The most significant is the Chapel of the Virgin of Socorro, second to the right, design attributed to Fernando de Casas y Novoa, the architect of the Obradoiro facade of the cathedral, a centralized space decorated with polychrome materials and jaspes of sumptuous appearance Covered with dome casetonada on pechinas.

=== Museum of religious art ===
At the moment part of the convent is enabled as a museum of religious art. The permanent exhibition consists of 12 rooms distributed in several floors with collections of paintings, sculptures, goldsmiths, engraving plants, liturgical vestments, archaeological remains, bibliographical collections. and on the way it can visit the old printing press, the pharmacy, the relics.

The sacristy stands on the north side of the church. It was begun by Friar Gabriel de las Casas at the end of the 17th century and completed by Fernando de Casas y Novoa in 1740. It is of Greek cross plan with canopy vaults in the arms and central dome of casetones.

As part of the complex has been set up as a museum, here you can see a series of figures of the monument of Holy Thursday located on the pillars and the start of the entablature on which the vaults support: the Four Evangelists and the Cardinal and Theological Virtues.

From the sacristy there are stairs leading to the high choir, supported by a flat casetonada vault that alternates stone and wood imitating stone to relieve its weight.

It houses the Renaissance choir of the Cathedral of Santiago, dismantled from its location in the center of the main nave and moved here in the 1945s, once again transferred to A Coruñan Church of Santa María de Sobrado dos Monxes in the 1970s and again in San Martiño since 2004, after a restoration process.

Another one of the rooms incorporated to the circuit of the museum is the old apothecary. Prior to the 15th century, health care relied mainly on monasteries. Thus, in all the monastic communities there existed an apothecary monk who cultivated and collected herbs and medicinal plants with which he developed his remedies.

The San Martiño drugstore has been documented since the end of the 16th century, always run by a monk from the community. At the beginning he attended to the community and, sporadically, to some poor pilgrim or sick person. But in the middle of the 17th century it was opened to the public and at the beginning of the 19th century it was moved to the left wing of the main façade of the monastery to allow access from outside, in what became known as the new pharmacy.

== Bibliography ==
- Vigo Trasancos, Alfredo (1994). "Bartolomé Fernández Lechuga y el claustro procesional de San Martín Pinario en Santiago de Compostela". Cuadernos de Estudios Gallegos (in Spanish). 41 (106). IEGPS (CSIC): 277–310. doi:10.3989/ceg.1994.v41.i106.285.
