= Hostal dos Reis Católicos =

Coordinates: 42.8814°N 8.5458°W

- Hostal de Los Reyes Católicos
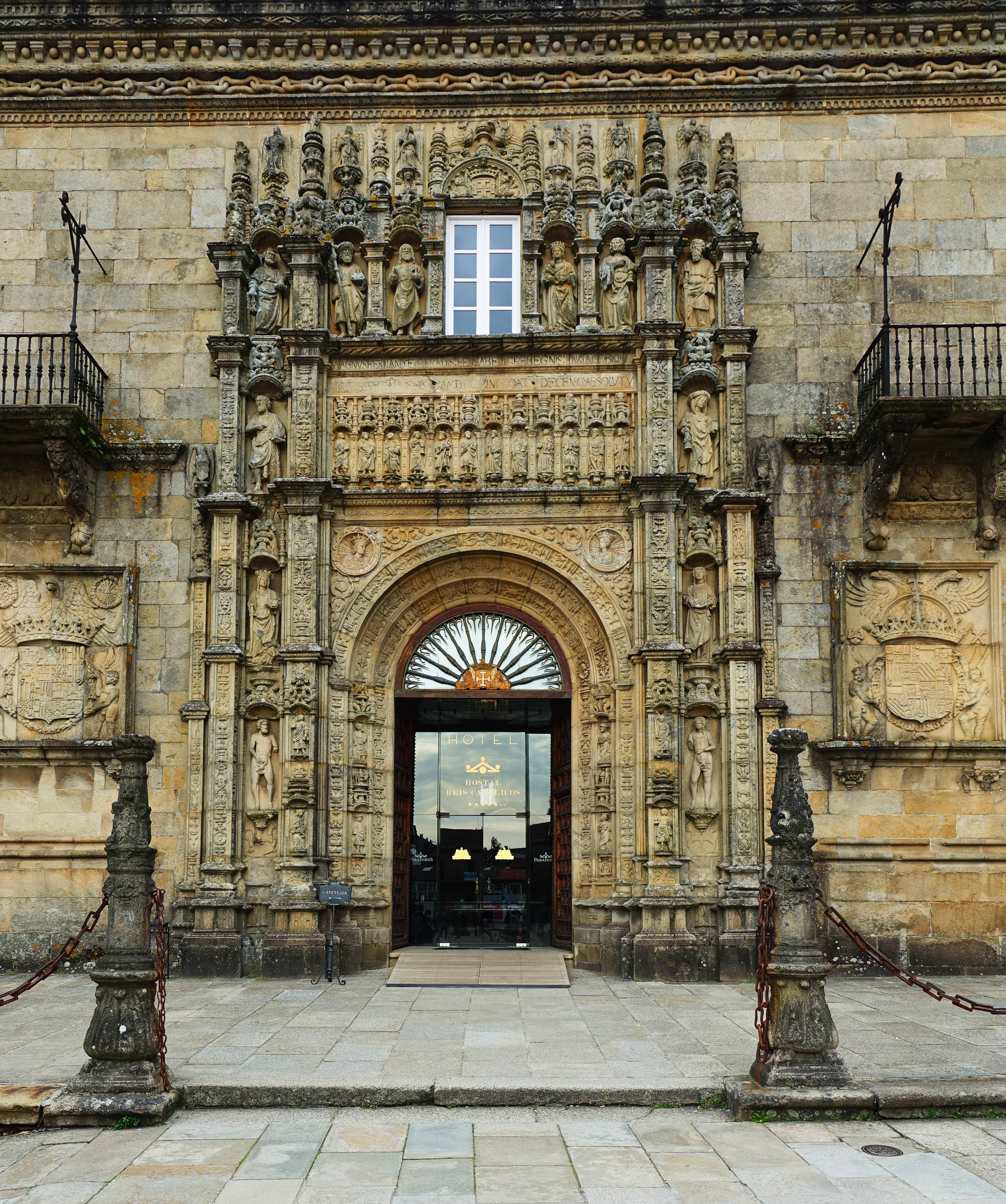
- The Plateresque front façade (16th century)
- Interactive map of the Hostal dos Reis Católicos area
- Alternative names: Parador de Santiago de Compostela
- Hotel chain: Paradores

General information
- Status: Active
- Type: Hostelry
- Architectural style: Plateresque
- Location: Praza do Obradoiro 1, Santiago de Compostela (A Coruña), Spain
- Named for: Catholic Monarchs of Spain
- Construction started: 1501
- Completed: 1511

Design and construction
- Architect: Enrique Egas

Other information
- Number of rooms: 137

Website
- Parador de Santiago de Compostela

The Hostal dos Reis Católicos (in Galician), also called the Hostal de Los Reyes Católicos (in Spanish) or Parador de Santiago de Compostela, is a five-star Parador hotel, located in the Praza do Obradoiro of Santiago de Compostela, Spain. It is widely considered one of the oldest continuously operating hotels in the world, and has also been called the "most beautiful hotel in Europe".

In 1486, after a pilgrimage to Santiago de Compostela, Queen Isabella I of Castile and King Ferdinand II of Aragon, the Catholic Monarchs of Spain, decided to build a hostelry and hospital for pilgrims at the very end of the Camino de Santiago (Way of St. James). They provided the necessary funds in 1499, construction began in 1501 and it took over ten years. It continued with this function for four centuries. In 1953, the hospital service was moved to a new location nearby, and in 1954 the hostelry re-opened as a luxury hotel after undergoing a renovation. In 1986, it was incorporated to the Paradores network. Nowadays, with its 137 rooms, it is the finest and largest by capacity parador of the network, and continuing its hospitable tradition, it provides free services to a limited number of pilgrims every day.

== Background ==
=== Pilgrimage trail ===
Pilgrims from all over Europe, throughout the Middle Ages, both rich and poor, followed the famous pilgrimage trail, the Way of St. James, leading to the shrine of the apostle Saint James the Great at the Cathedral of Santiago de Compostela. In 1486, Queen Isabella I and King Ferdinand II completed the pilgrimage across northern Spain. As a sign of their religious piety, and their growing economic and political might, they began a program to improve the infrastructure and support services on the pilgrimage trail. They built new hostels, bridges, churches, and public wells. The major improvement project by the Catholic Monarchs was the Hostal at the very end of the pilgrimage trail, right next to the cathedral.

=== Hospitality ===
The words hostal, hotel, hostel, hostelry, hospital and hospice share the same root, based on the Latin hospes meaning guest. Nowadays, the concepts are clearly differentiated, but at the time the Hostal started operation the idea of its functions included sleep, food, as well as care for injured feet and other ailments deriving from long-distance walking. There was little distinction between lodging and medical care, as hostels were guided by the general concept of hospitality.

== Building ==
The Hostal dos Reis Católicos sits at the very end of the Way of St. James, at the Praza do Obradoiro, next to the Santiago de Compostela Cathedral.

Construction of the building began in 1501 and took over ten years. Masons, engineers, and sculptors from all over Europe were called upon to work on the project. The project, overseen by the architect Enrique Egas, has a Plateresque façade. In 1526, King Carlos V completed work on the Plaza Obradoiro, creating a large open plaza joining the Hostal and great Cathedral.

The Hostal was constructed with four colonnaded and interconnected courtyards within its walls. Two of these cloisters date from the eighteen hundreds, but the two earlier are from the sixteenth century and feature water fountains at their hearts. The later courtyards are of a baroque design and were constructed during an extensive remodeling and renovation.

== Hospital ==
The Hostal de los Reyes Católicos served as a hospital and hospice, where pilgrims could recover and rejuvenate after completing the pilgrimage. The Hostal had a multilingual staff of doctors, nurses, and priests on call 24-hours a day; and provided all services free of charge. Pilgrims were allowed to recover at the Hostal for three days in summer, and five days in winter.

Since the Hostal was essentially a large state-run hospital, it attracted many doctors and scholars. The Hostal began serving the medical needs of the general population of the city. One of the oldest medical schools in Spain sprang up nearby, and it helped establish the tradition of the city as center for university learning and higher education.

== Modern hotel ==
During the 20th century, the caudillo Francisco Franco stayed at the Hostal. It was his decision to renovate the Hostal into a world-class modern hotel with the occasion of the 1954 Jacobean Jubilee, moving the hospital facilities to a new location nearby. Franco inaugurated the renovated hotel in person on 24 July 1954. On 24 February 1986, the hotel was incorporated to the Paradores hotel network.

Today, the Hostal dos Reis Católicos is widely considered one of the finest hotels in the world and the best in Spain.

One of the restaurants in the Hostal, Restaurante Dos Reis (Restaurant of the Kings), is a historic space housed in what was once the stables for the Royal Hospital. The spectacular dining room is located in the building's half-basement, with vaulted stone ceilings and elegant décor.

As of 2022 the hotel continues to provide free breakfast, lunch and dinner every day to the first ten pilgrims who prove they have completed the Way of St. James.

== Gallery ==
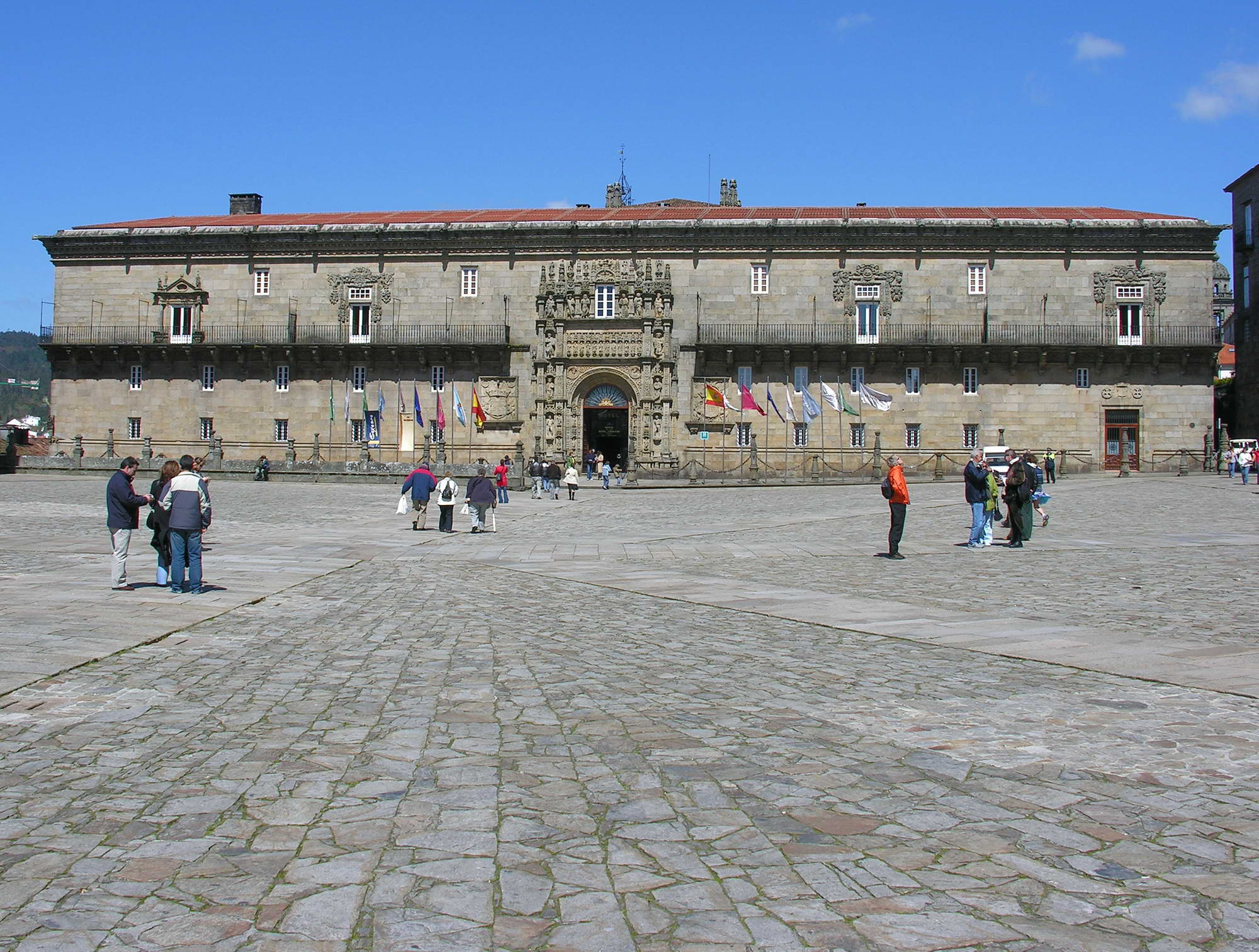
Front façade.

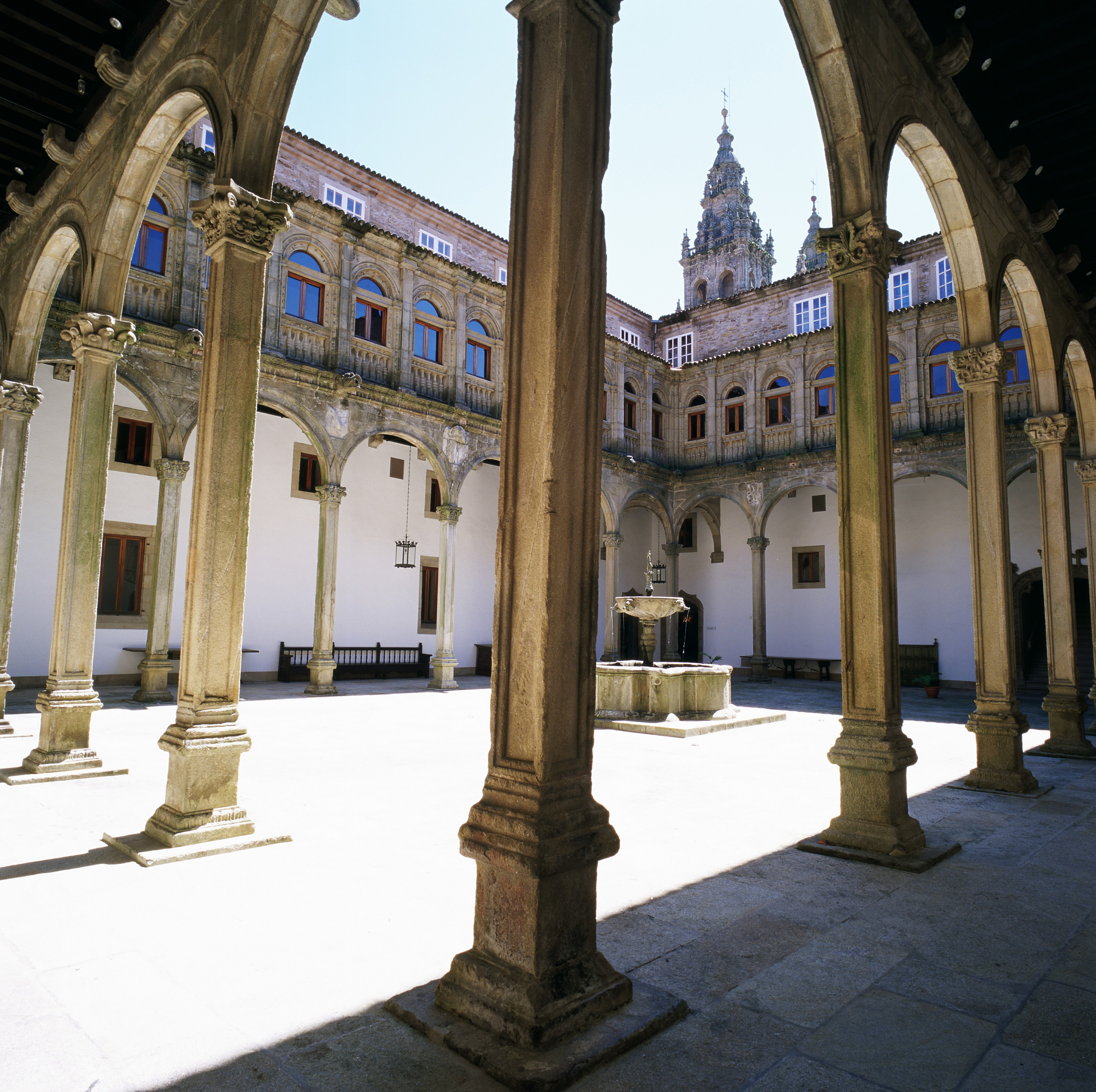
Cloister of Saint John.

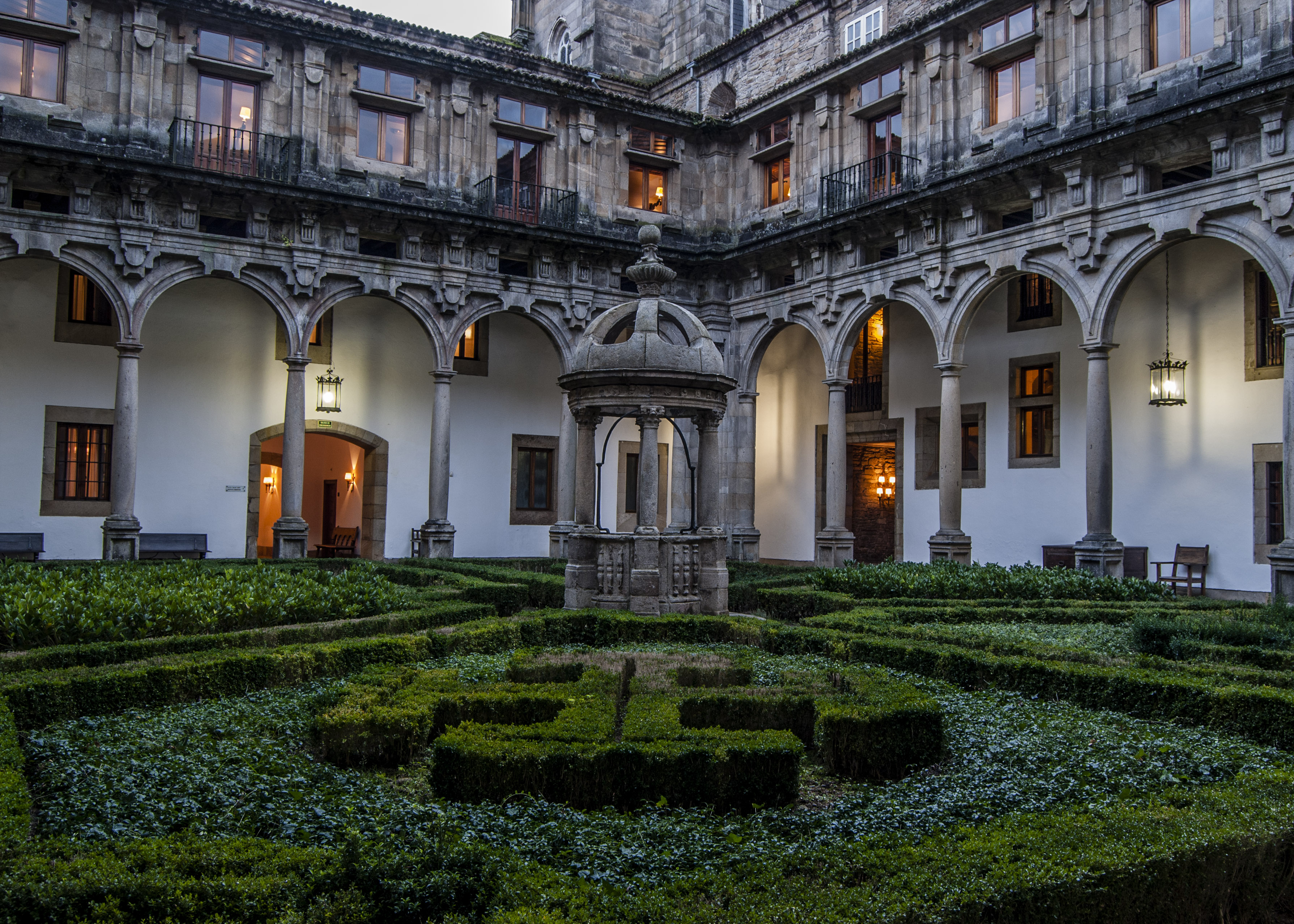
Cloister of Saint Matthew.

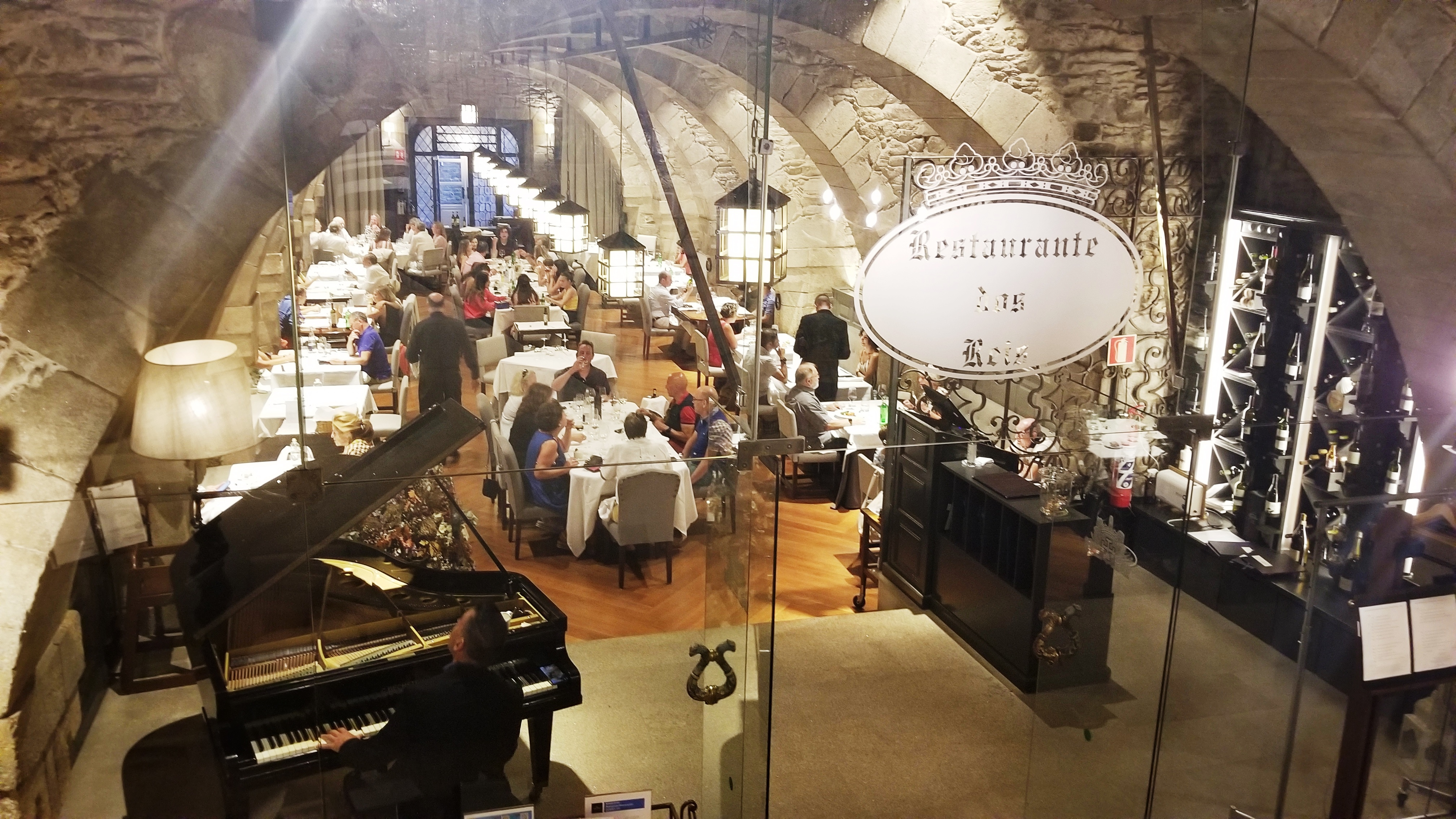
Restaurante Dos Reis (Restaurant of the Kings), one of the restaurants at the Hostal.

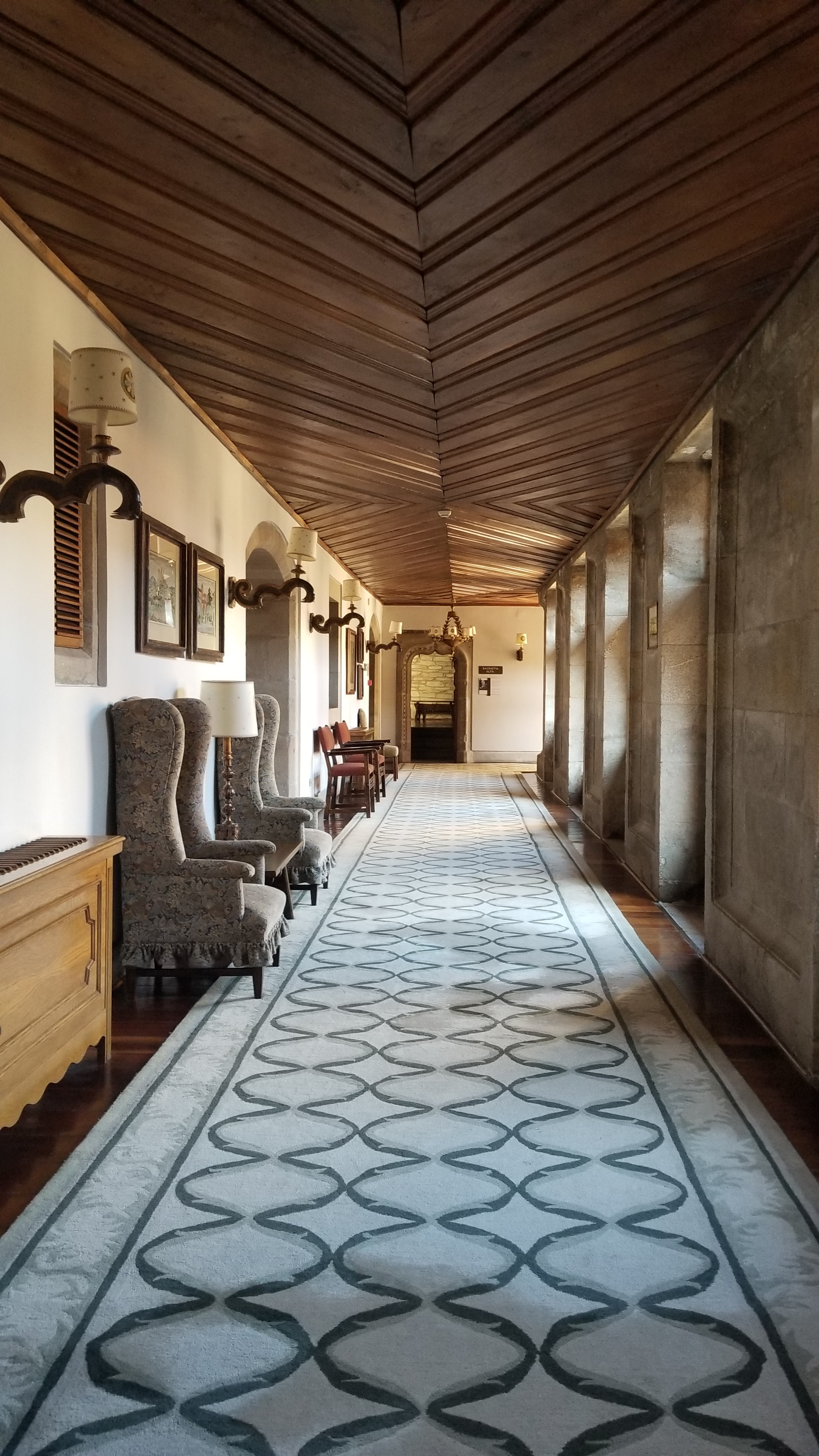
View of a hallway.

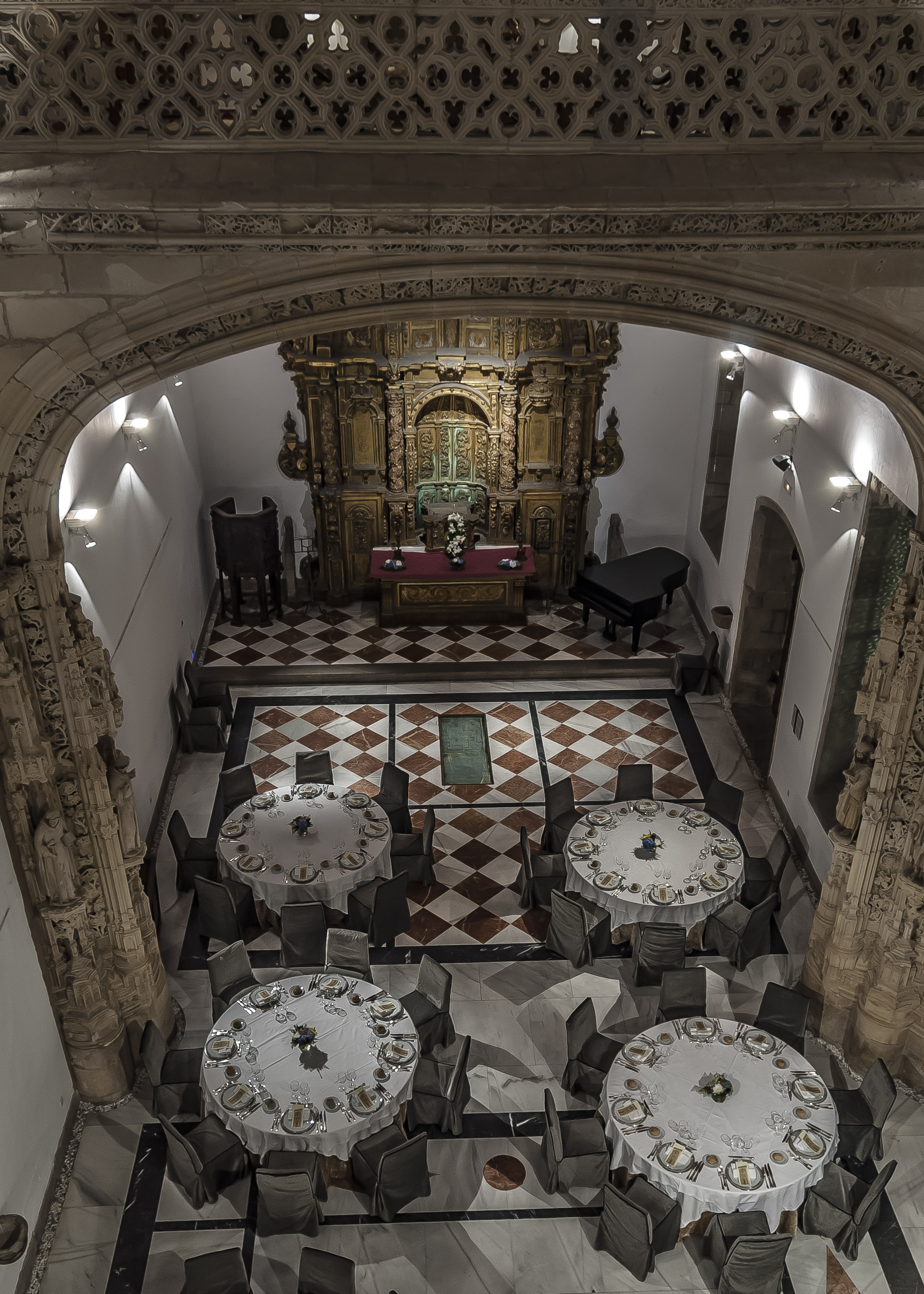
Chapel.

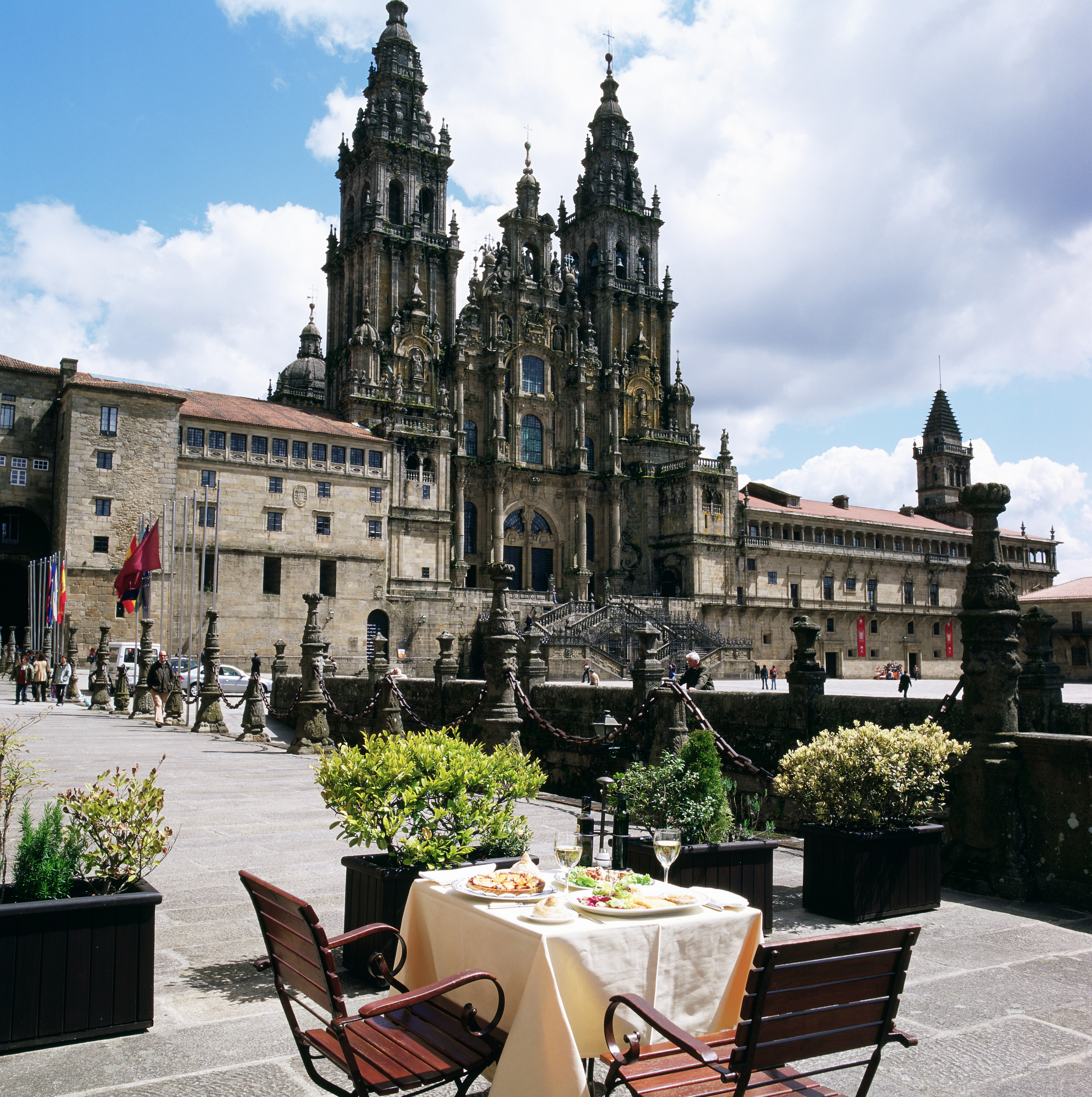
View of the Santiago de Compostela Cathedral from the Hostal's bar terrace.

== See also ==
=== Related articles ===
- Pazo of the Counts of Maceda

=== External links ===
- Hotel website
