= AUF =

AUF may refer to:

- African Unification Front, an organization promoting African unity,
- Afghan United Front, an Afghan anti-Taliban group,
- Agence universitaire de la Francophonie, the international educational organisation
- AMX-30 AuF1, a French self-propelled howitzer
- Angeles University Foundation, a Catholic university in Angeles City, Philippines
- Australian Ultralight Federation, now Recreational Aviation Australia, the Australian governing body for ultra-light aircraft
- Australian Underwater Federation, the peak body in Australia for underwater sports
- James Bond 007: Agent Under Fire, a 2001 video game
- Uruguayan Football Association (Spanish: Asociación Uruguaya de Fútbol)
- Workers' Youth League (Norway), (Bokmål: Arbeidernes Ungdomsfylking), the Norwegian democratic socialist youth movement
- AuF, gold(I) fluoride
- AUF1 (channel), Austrian media platform
- HNRPD, a protein also known as AUF1
