= Cross of Alcoraz =

Heraldic emblem

Argent, cross of gules with four heads of Moorish kings in the quarters. Known as the "Cross of Alcoraz" (Cruz de Alcoraz). Gaspar Torres' Armorial of Aragon, 1536. Provincial Archives of Zaragoza.

The Cross of Alcoraz is the name given to a heraldic coat of arms and flag made up of the Cross of Saint George, or cross of gules on Argent, with a Moor's head in each quarter. The earliest documented evidence of these arms is in a rare lead-sealed decree from the chancery of Peter III of Aragon, circa 1281, most likely used as the King's Coat of arms, alluding to the spirit of the Crusades and his ancestral namesake, Peter I of Aragon. The arms also appear in the third quarter of the current Coat of arms of Aragon.

According to 14th century sources, the 'Cross of Alcoraz' traditionally originated with the Battle of Alcoraz (in 1096) as King Peter's battle shield, inspired by the legendary miraculous intervention of Saint George in the Reconquista of Huesca. The earliest depiction of the cross, that of the chancery seal of 1281, shows four Moors' heads with beards but no headbands (or bandages).

Throughout the Middle Ages up to the 20th century, both Aragonese and international variants (viz. flag of Sardinia) have either turned the orientation of the Moor's heads, made them face each other symmetrically, or depicted them as the heads of Saracen kings with open crowns.

This heraldic coat of arms was directly attributed to the Kingdom of Aragon from the mid 15th century and was also adopted as the royal standard of the Kingdom of Sardinia from the second half of the 15th century, when the island was a territory of the Crown of Aragon. In the Sardinian flag, the Moors' heads were blindfolded. In the modern flag of Sardinia, the heads are facing right, and the "blindfolds" have evolved into headbands.

It is pointed out that the adoption of the so-called Cross of Alcoraz by Sardinia most likely dates back to the end of the 15th century, according to a study on the Sardinian flag by Italian author Luisa D'Arienzo.

== See also ==
- Moor's head (heraldry)
- Battle of Alcoraz

== Bibliography ==
- CONDE, Rafael, en "La bula de plomo de los reyes de Aragón y la cruz «de Alcoraz»", Emblemata, XI (2005), pp. 59–82 ISSN 1137-1056.
- MONTANER FRUTOS, Alberto, El señal del rey de Aragón: Historia y significado, Zaragoza, Institución «Fernando el Católico», 1995. ISBN 84-7820-283-8.
- REDONDO VEINTEMILLAS, Guillermo, Alberto Montaner Frutos y María Cruz García López, Aragón en sus escudos y banderas, Zaragoza, Caja de la Inmaculada, 2007 (Colección Mariano de Pano y Ruata, 26), pp. 19–20. ISBN 978-84-96869-06-6.
- DE MAYERNE TURQUET, Lewis, in "The Generall Historie of Spaine", p. 264, written in French by Lewis de Mayerne Turquet, 1583, Translated into English by Edward Grimeston, Published by A Flip and G. Eld, London, 1612.
