= Il Blasone in Sicilia =

Italian heraldic book

Il Blasone in Sicilia

Il Blasone in Sicilia : ossia, Raccolta araldica is an Italian heraldic book written by Palizzolo Gravina, baron of Ramione. Edited in Palermo in 1871-1875, contains over 2,000 coats of arms of Sicilian families and is important for the study of Sicilian aristocracy.

Produced through extensive archival research and comparative analysis, the work was presented as an early scholarly attempt to systematize and interpret both civic and noble heraldry in Sicily, supported by detailed color plates and commentary on forms, colors, and meanings. Gravina sought to reconstruct historical sources and formal transformations, contributing to the development of a distinct tradition of Sicilian heraldic scholarship. It contains some inaccuracies, such as misrepresentation of the Caltagirone arms (the eagle holding a "giant’s bone" rather than a Moor's head).
