= Moor's head =

Heraldic figure

Moor's head from the flag of Corsica

A Moor's head, also known as a Maure, since the 11th century, is a symbol depicting the head of a black moor. The term moor came to define anyone who was African and Muslim.

== Origin ==
The precise origin of the Moor's head as a heraldic symbol is a subject of controversy. The most likely explanation is that it is derived from the heraldic war flag of the Reconquista depicting the Cross of Alcoraz, symbolizing Peter I of Aragon and Pamplona's victory over the "Moorish" kings of the Taifa of Zaragoza in the Battle of Alcoraz in 1096. The headband may originally have been a blindfold. Another theory claims that it represents the Egyptian Saint Maurice (3rd century AD).

The earliest heraldic use of the Moor's head is first recorded in 1281, during the reign of Peter III of Aragon and represents the Cross of Alcoraz, which the King adopted as his personal coat of arms. The Crown of Aragon had for a long time governed Sardinia and Corsica, having been granted the islands by the Pope, although they never really exercised formal control. The Moor's head became a symbol of the islands.

== Flags, seals, and emblems ==
This symbol is used in heraldry, vexillography, and political imagery.

=== Coat of arms of Coburg ===
Coat of arms of Coburg

The German city of Coburg depicts St. Maurice.

=== Coat of arms of Freising ===
The medieval Prince-Bishopric of Freising used a crowned Moor's head, usually with a red collar, as its coat of arms, which is continued by the modern Archdiocese of Munich and Freising and the district of Freising (but not the city). Pope Benedict XVI, who served as Archbishop of Munich and Freising, incorporated the device into his personal arms.

=== Flag of Corsica ===
Flag of Corsica

The main charge in the coat of arms in Corsica is a U Moru, Corsican for "The Moor". An early version is attested in the 14th-century Gelre Armorial, where an unblindfolded Moor's head represents Corsica as a territory of the Crown of Aragon. Interestingly, the Moor's head is attached to his shoulders and upper body, and he is alive and smiling. In 1736, it was used by both sides during the struggle for independence.

In 1760, General Pasquale Paoli ordered the necklace to be removed from the head and the blindfold raised. His reason, reported by his biographers, was "Les Corses veulent y voir clair. La liberté doit marcher au flambeau de la philosophie. Ne dirait-on pas que nous craignons la lumière ?" (English: "The Corsicans want to see clearly. Freedom must walk by the torch of philosophy. Won't they say that we fear the light?") The blindfold was thereafter changed to a headband.

The current flag of Corsica is the Bandera testa Mora, 'Flag with head of Moor', is male rather than female, and has a regular knot at the back of the head.

==== SC Bastia ====
The Moor's head appears on the logo for the Corsican football team SC Bastia, who play in the French football system's Ligue 2. A colorized version also appears in the logo of CA Bastia, while other Corsican clubs also use the Moor's head in their logos.

=== Flag of Sardinia ===
Flag of Sardinia

The flag of Sardinia is informally known as the Four Moors (Italian: I quattro mori, Logudorese: Sos Bator Moros, Campidanese: Is Cuatru Morus) and comprises four Moor heads.

=== African Unification Front ===
The "Maure" is the African Unification Front's flag and emblem. The head is blindfolded representing the impartiality of justice, and the knot is tied into a stylized Adinkra symbol for omnipotence (Gye Nyame).

== Modern controversy ==
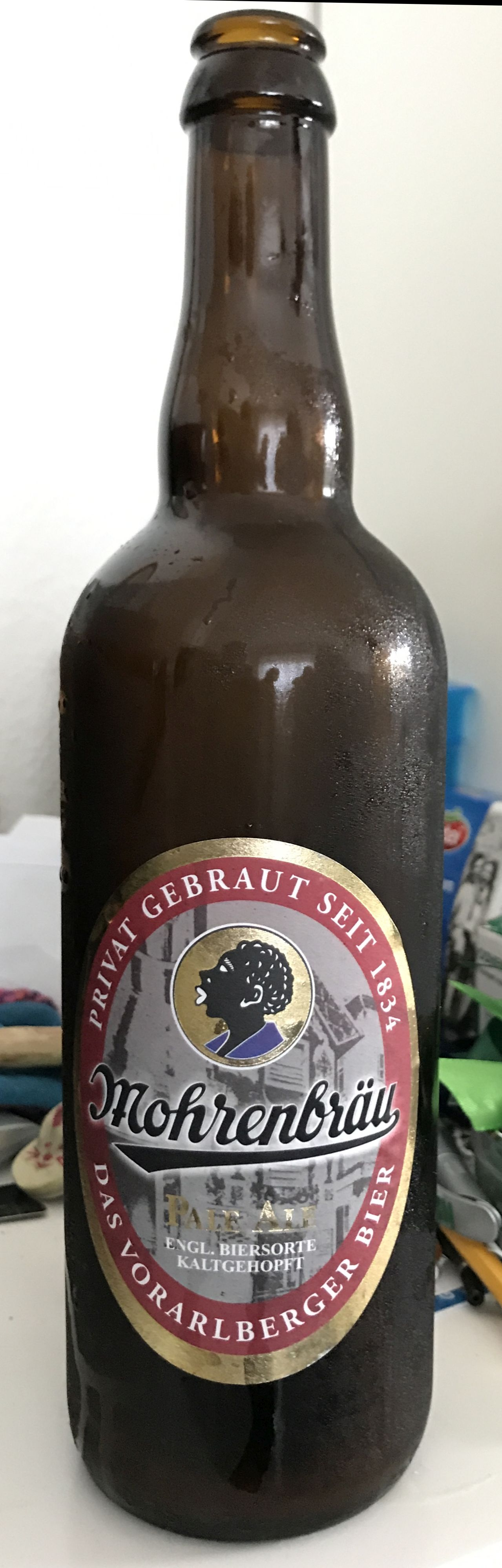
Bottle of Mohrenbrauerei

Halua Pinto, a Social Democrat in the city government of Bern, Switzerland, has characterized the use of the Moor's head as racist, when used as a symbol by a workers guild.

In 2012, activists requested the brewing company Mohrenbrauerei to remove the "Moor's head" from its bottles; the company declined, saying the design was part of heraldry used by the family who started the brewery.

== See also ==
- Blackamoor (decorative arts)
- Heads in heraldry
- Turk head (heraldry)
- Cross of Alcoraz
