= Anglo-Corsican Kingdom =

1794–96 British client state in Corsica

Kingdom of Corsica Regno di Corsica (Italian) Regnu di Corsica (Corsican)
- 1794–1796
- Flag^{a} Coat of arms
- Motto: Amici e non di ventura (English: Friends, and not by mere accident)
- Anthem: Dio vi salvi Regina ("God save you Queen")
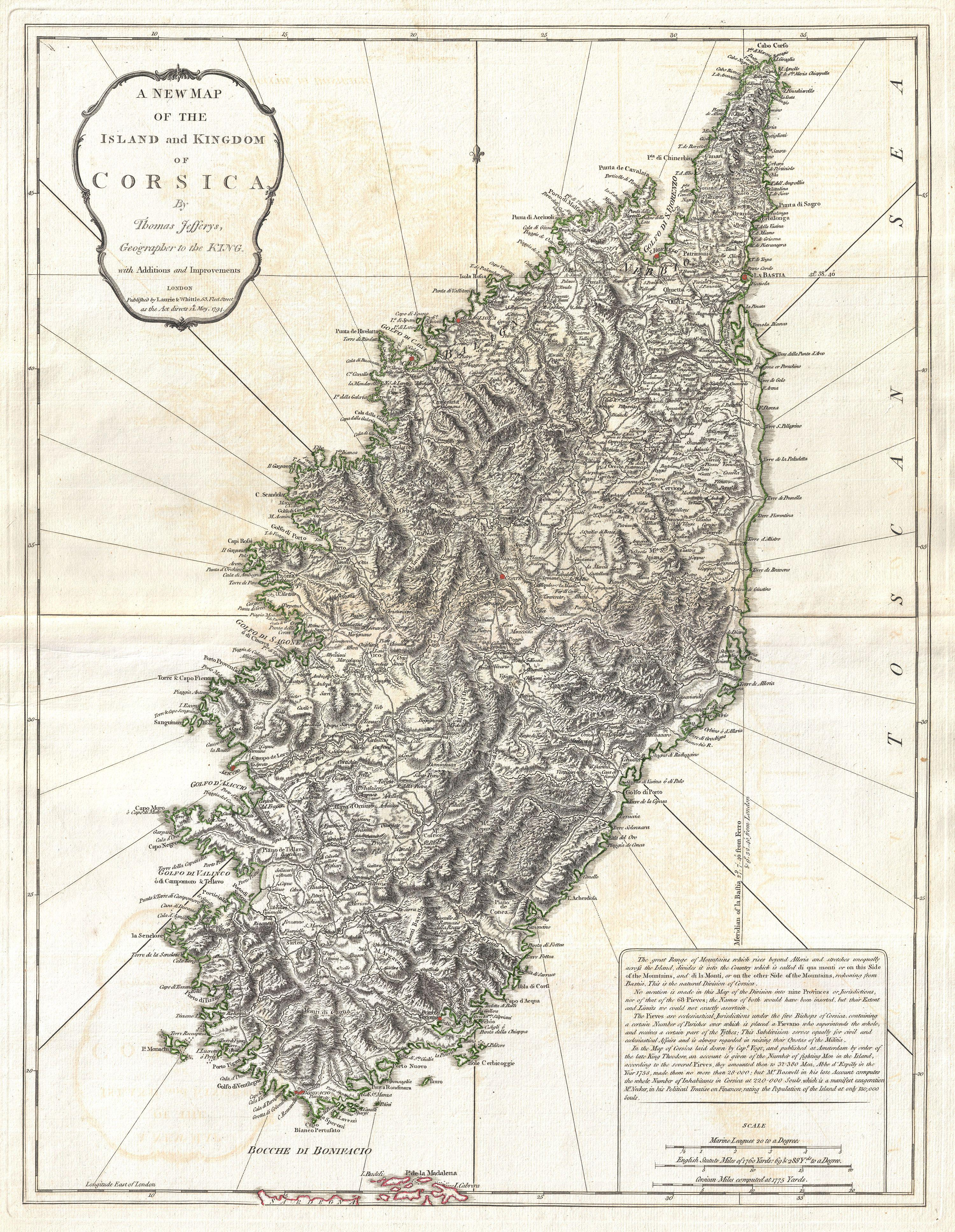
- 1794 map of the "Island and Kingdom of Corsica"
- Status: Personal union with Great Britain
- Capital: Corte (until 1795); Bastia (from 1795); 42°10′23″N 9°07′48″E
- Common languages: Italian; Corsican
- Religion: Roman Catholicism
- Government: Parliamentary monarchy
  - King^{b}: George III
  - Viceroy: Sir Gilbert Elliot, 4th Baronet
  - President of the Council of State: Count Carlo Andrea Pozzo di Borgo
- Legislature: Parliament
- Historical era: Age of Enlightenment
  - Established: 15−19 June 1794
  - Siege of Calvi: 17 June − 10 August 1794
  - Exile of Paoli: October 1795
  - British evacuation: 11 October 1796
  - Conquered: 19 October 1796
- Currency: Soldo
Preceded by	Succeeded by
First French Republic	First French Republic
- Today part of: France ∟ Corsica
- ^{a} The flag of the kingdom was the Corsican Moor's head united with the British royal arms.^{b} Represented by a viceroy.

The Anglo-Corsican Kingdom (Italian: Regno Anglo-Corso; Corsican: Riame anglo-corsu or Riamu anglu-corsu), also known officially as the Kingdom of Corsica (Italian: Regno di Corsica; Corsican: Regnu di Corsica), was a client state of the Kingdom of Great Britain that existed on the island of Corsica from 1794 to 1796, during the French Revolutionary Wars.

== Background ==
By the time of the French Revolution, Corsica had been a part of France for just two decades. The Corsican leader Pasquale Paoli, who had been exiled under the monarchy, became something of an idol of liberty and democracy, and, in 1789, was invited to Paris by the National Constituent Assembly, where he was celebrated as a hero in front of the assembly. He was afterwards sent back to Corsica with the rank of lieutenant-general.

However, Paoli eventually split from the revolutionary movement over the issue of the execution of King Louis XVI and threw in his lot with the royalist party. Accused of treason by the French National Convention, he summoned a consulta (assembly) at Corte in 1793, with himself as president, at which Corsica's formal secession from France was declared. He requested the protection of the British government, then at war with revolutionary France, and suggested the Kingdom of Ireland as a model for an autonomous kingdom under the British monarch. For Britain it was an opportunity to secure a Mediterranean base.

== History ==
In 1794, Britain sent a fleet to Corsica under Admiral Samuel Hood. It was during the fighting to capture Calvi that then-Captain Horatio Nelson lost the sight in his right eye. For a short time, Corsica was added to the dominions of King George III, chiefly by the exertions of Hood's fleet, and Paoli's cooperation.

The constitution was democratic, with a viceroy (Sir Gilbert Elliot) representing the King, an elected unicameral Parliament, and a Council that was the executive body of the Kingdom, with Carlo Andrea Pozzo di Borgo as procureur-general-syndic (chief of the civil government) and later president of the council of state, at its head.

The relationship between Paoli's government and the British was never clearly defined, however, resulting in numerous questions of authority; in particular, tensions arose from the conflict between Sir Gilbert's loyalty to the British monarchy, and Paoli's republican leanings and desire to defend Corsican autonomy. The Viceroy was also given the right of a veto of policy in the Constitution. There was also a pronounced division between Corte, the traditional capital and an inland stronghold, and Bastia on the coast, where Sir Gilbert moved the capital in early 1795, and which was the centre for French and Corsican royalists. With Spain coming in on the side of the French, the British realised their position in the Mediterranean was precarious and withdrew their forces from the island by October. The Crown invited Paoli to resign and return to exile in Britain with a pension, which, having no alternative, he was forced to do, joining the British in their retreat from the island. On 19 October 1796, the French reconquered Bastia and Corsica became two French départements (Golo and Liamone).

== Viceroy ==
- Sir Gilbert Elliot, 4th Baronet (later 1st Earl of Minto)

== See also ==
- Pasquale Paoli
- Corsican Republic
- Kingdom of Corsica (1736)
