= Saint George's Cross =

Red cross on a white background

The Cross of Saint George as a rectangular (3:5 ratio) flag.

The Cross of Saint George as a square flag.

In heraldry, Saint George's Cross (also known as the Cross of Saint George) is a red cross on a white background, which, from the Late Middle Ages, has been associated with Saint George, a military saint who is often depicted as a crusader.

Associated with the Crusades, the red-on-white cross has its origins in the 10th century and was subsequently used as the ensign of the Republic of Genoa. The symbol was later adopted by the Swabian League in the pre-Reformation Holy Roman Empire. George became recognised as the patron saint of England in the fourteenth century, replacing St. Edmund the Martyr.

Since then, the flag has commonly been identified as the national flag of England. Saint George is also the patron saint of Catalonia and the country of Georgia. Across Europe, it appears in the coat of arms of Barcelona, and the national flag of Georgia supplements the symbol with Jerusalem crosses. Across Northern Italy, in cities such as Bologna, Genoa, Padua, Reggio Emilia, Mantua, Vercelli, and Alessandria, the design has received significant support. However, the flag of Milan, which was adopted in 1045, instead represents a simplification of the cross of Saint Ambrose, who was bishop of Milan in the 4th century.

== Origins and medieval use ==
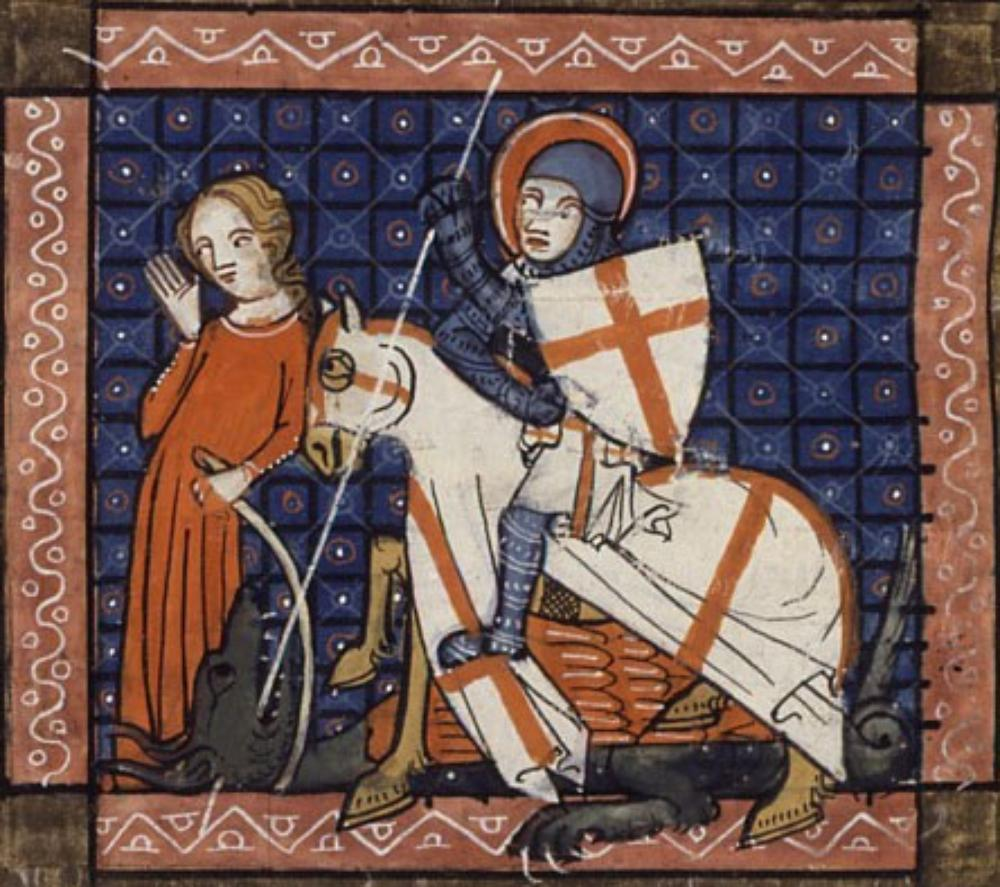
Miniature of Saint George and the Dragon, ms. of the Legenda Aurea, dated 1348 (BNF Français 241, fol. 101v.)

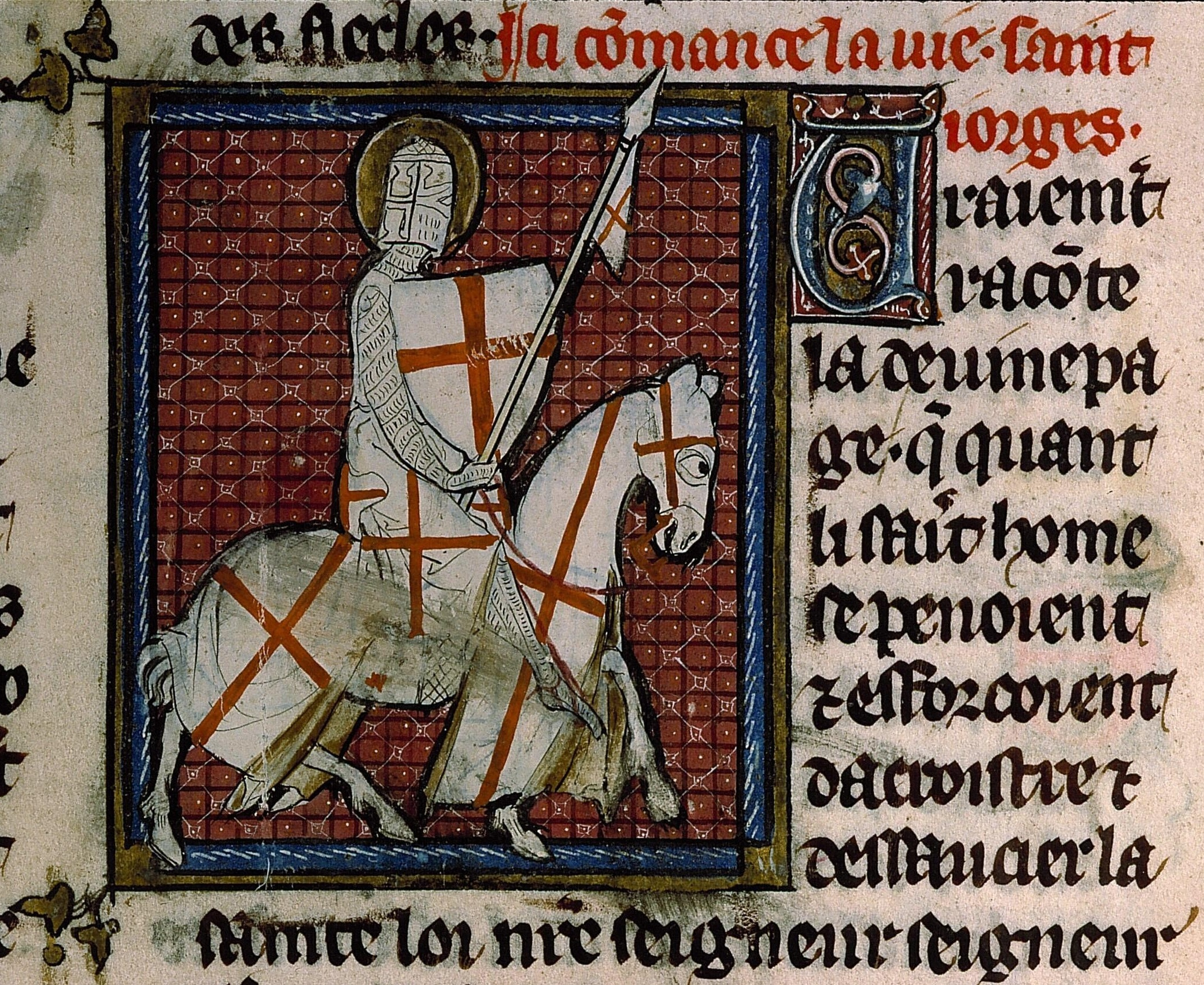
Saint George as a crusader knight, miniature from a ms. of Vies de Saints, c. 1310 (Bibliothèque Sainte-Geneviève, Ms. 588)

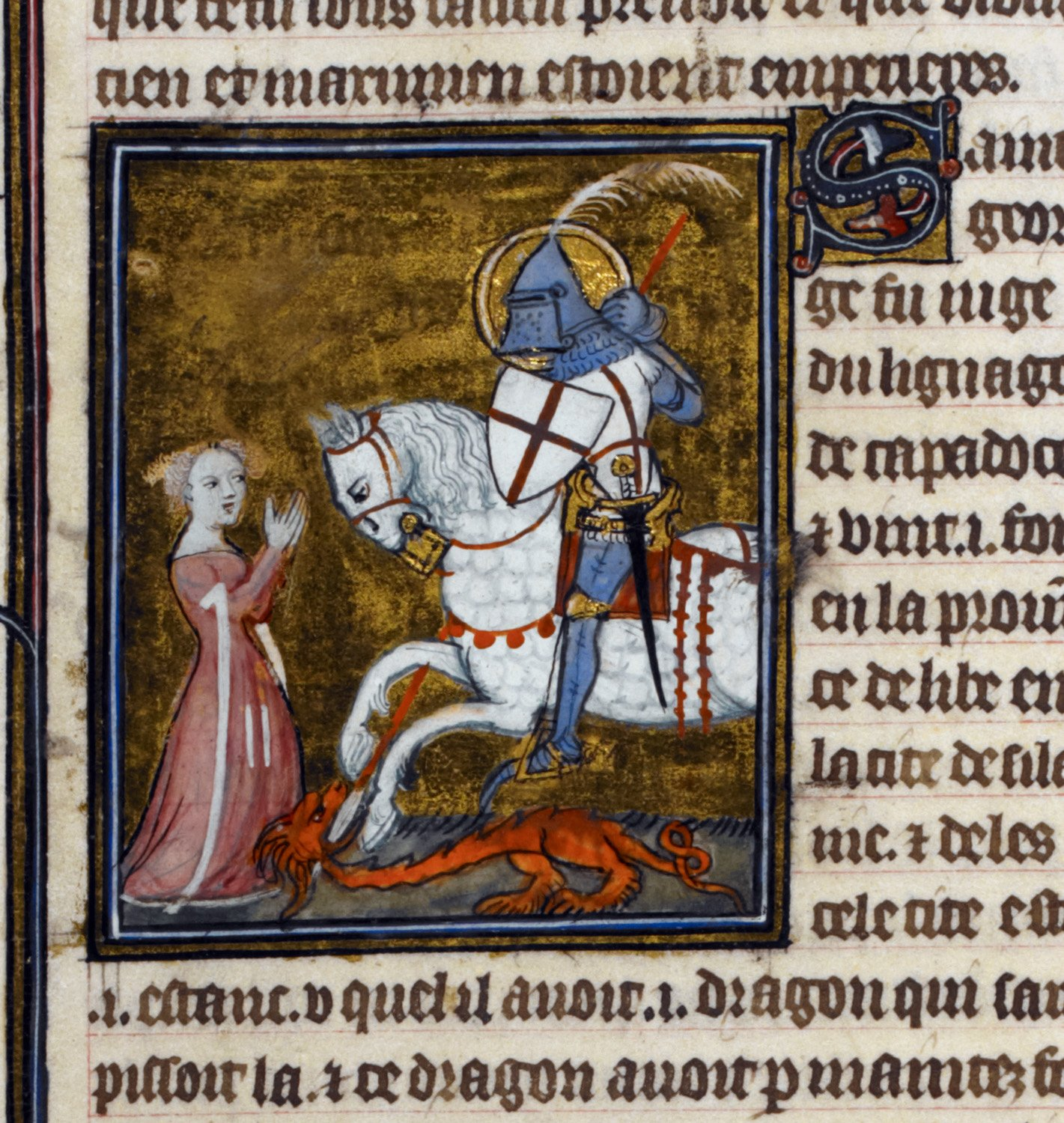
Miniature of Saint George and the Dragon, ms. of the Legenda Aurea, Paris, 1382 (BL Royal 19 B XVII, f. 109).

Saint George became widely venerated as a warrior saint during the Third Crusade. There was a legend that he had miraculously assisted Godfrey of Bouillon; also that Richard the Lionheart had placed himself under his protection. According to legend, the crusaders received miraculous help at the siege of Antioch on 28 June 1098 from a great army on white horses, clothed in white and bearing white banners, led by St. George, St. Demetrius, and St. Mercurius. However, there was no association of the red cross with St. George before the end of the crusades.

The red cross in particular was associated with the Knights Templar, from the time of the Second Crusade (1145), but in 1188 red and white crosses were chosen to identify the French and English troops in the "Kings' Crusade" of Philip II of France and Henry II of England, respectively. Together with the Jerusalem Cross, the plain red-on-white became a recognizable symbol of the crusader from about 1190, and in the 13th century it came to be used as a standard or emblem by numerous leaders or polities who wanted to associate themselves with the crusades. The red-on-white combination was chosen by the Kingdom of Aragon, among others.

Saint George was depicted as a crusader knight during this time, but the red cross had no particular association with him. A crusader-era fresco in the crypt of Trani cathedral shows Saint George wearing a white cross on a red surcoat. The white-on-red version was chosen as the Reichsbanner ("imperial banner") by the German crusaders in the 12th century, and Emperor Frederick II used it in his European campaigns of the 1250s after he had returned from the crusades. It continued to be used as the Reichssturmfahne ("imperial war flag") of the Holy Roman Empire, eventually giving rise to the flag of Savoy and the present-day flags of Switzerland and Denmark. Via the conflict between (pro-Pope) Guelphs and (pro-Imperial) Ghibellines, the cross entered the heraldry of several north Italian principalities.

A vexillum beati Georgii is mentioned in the Genovese annals for the year 1198, referring to a red flag with a depiction of St. George and the dragon . An illustration of this flag appears in the annals for the year 1227. The Genoese flag with the red cross was used alongside this "George's flag", from at least 1218, and was known as the insignia cruxata comunis Janue ("cross ensign of the commune of Janua"). The flag showing the saint himself was the city's principal war flag, but the flag showing the plain cross was used alongside it in the 1240s.

The cross ceased to be a symbol directly associated with the "taking of the cross", the resolve to fight in a crusade, after the failure of the crusades in the 14th century. With the development of systematic heraldry, there was great demand for variations of the cross symbol and associated terminology. Juliana Berners reports that there were Crossis innumerabull born dayli. The term "St. George's cross" was at first associated with any plain Greek cross touching the edges of the field (not necessarily red on white).

Early representations of Saint George as a crusader knight with bearing a red-on-white cross still date to the late 13th century, and become widespread as the saint's attributed arms in the 14th and 15th centuries. Edward III of England chose Saint George as the patron saint of his Order of the Garter in 1348, and also took to using a red-on-white cross in the hoist of his Royal Standard.

== England ==
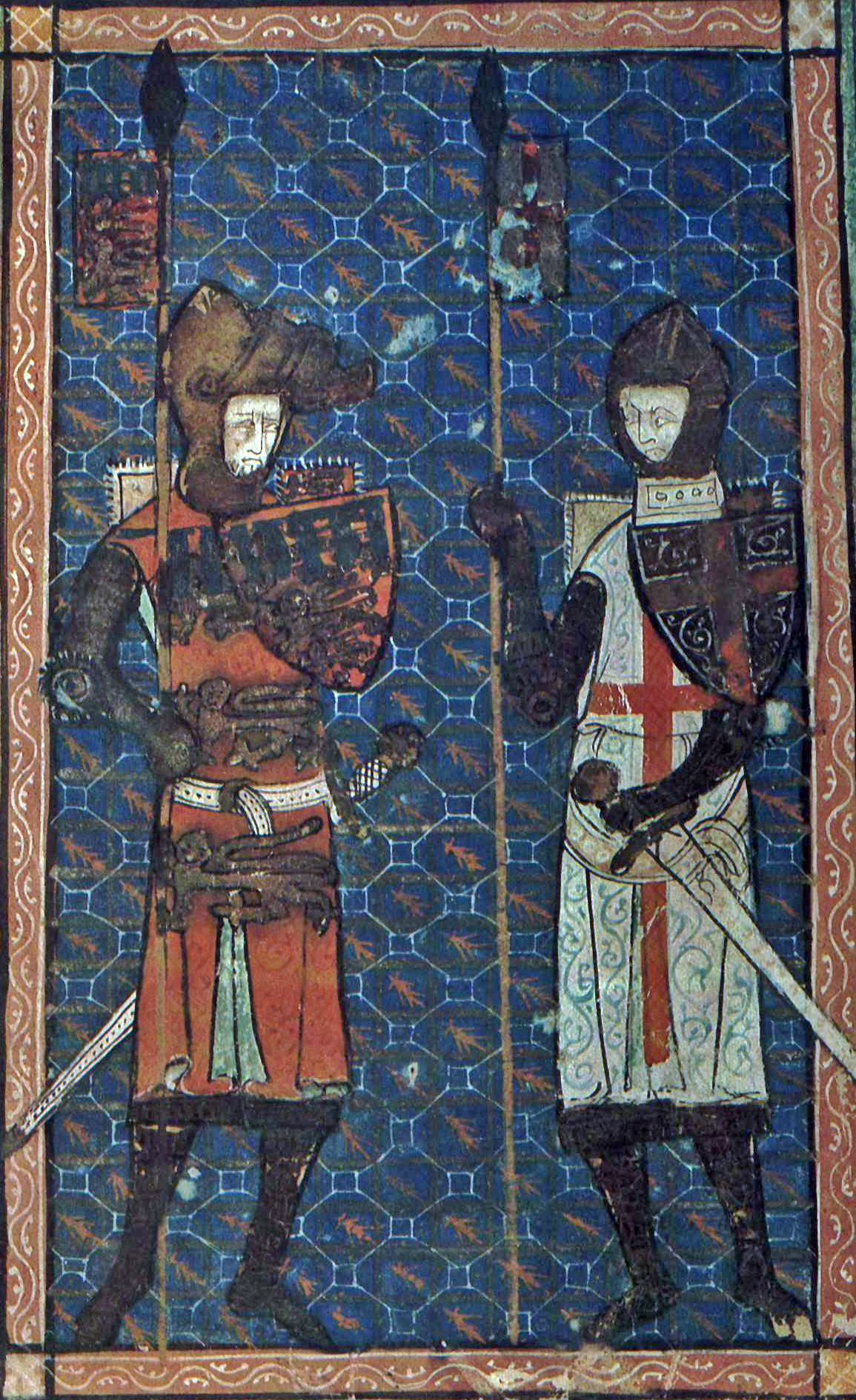
Saint George with an earl of Lancaster (probably Edmund Crouchback), from an English Book of Hours, c. 1330.

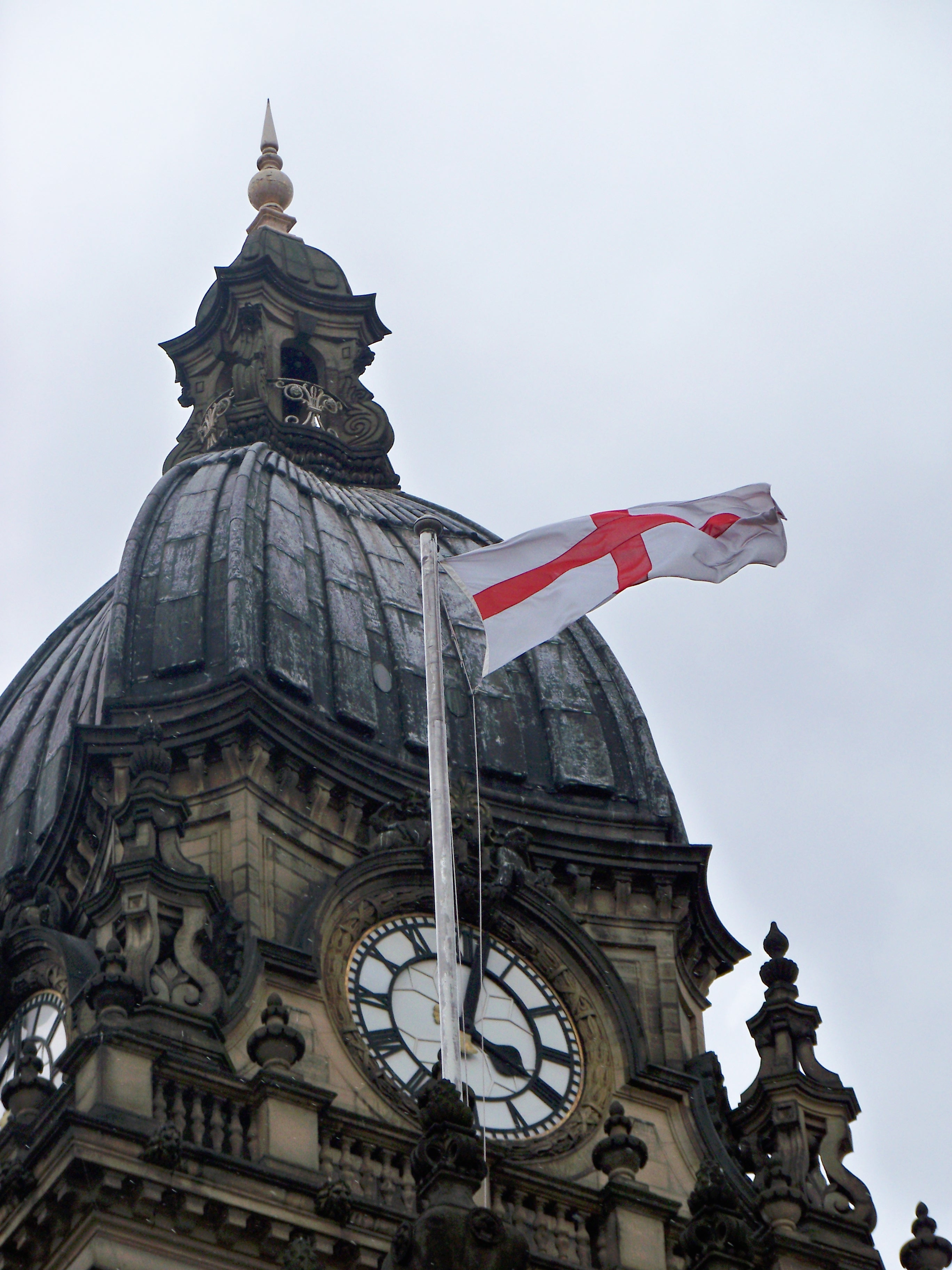
Saint George's flag flying on Leeds Town Hall (2009).

=== Origin ===
There was a historiographical tradition claiming that Richard the Lionheart himself adopted both the flag and the patron saint from Genoa at some point during his crusade.

King Richard the Lionheart, passing through Genoa in 1189-1190 to embark on the Third Crusade, requested and obtained from the Republic the use of the flag of St. George for his ships in exchange for the payment of an annual tribute which was regularly paid until 1771. This is noted in two sources, the Compendium of the histories of Genoa by Francesco Maria Accinelli (1750), and the Annals of the Republic of Genoa by Agostino Giustiniani.

On the origins of the flag and its connection to the Genoese flag, Prince Edward, Duke of Kent, said in a speech in Genoa in 1992:

The St. George's flag, a red cross on a white field, was adopted by England and the City of London in 1190 for their ships entering the Mediterranean to benefit from the protection of the Genoese fleet. The English Monarch paid an annual tribute to the Doge of Genoa for this privilege.

The red cross was introduced to England by the late 13th century, but not as a flag, and not at the time associated with Saint George. It was worn by English soldiers as an identification from the early years of the reign of Edward I (1270s), and perhaps originated a few years earlier, in the Second Barons' War (specifically in the Battle of Evesham of 1265, during which, according to chronicler William Rishanger, Simon de Montfort observed that the king had taken from him the idea of having his soldiers marked with a cross).

Saint George rose to the position of "patron saint of England" in a process beginning in 1348 with the foundation of the Order of the Garter and culminating with the abolition of all saint's banners except for the St. George's banner in 1552. From 1348 and throughout the 15th century, the Saint George's Cross was shown in the hoist of the Royal Standards of the Plantagenet kings of England.

=== Flag ===
Flag of England

Union Jack

The Flag of Georgia with Saint George cross in middle

The flag of Barcelona

Flag of Genoa

The Flag of Sardinia with Saint George cross in middle

The flag of Piedmont–Sardinia

A combined British flag was created in 1606 (after the dynastic union of England and Scotland in 1603, the so-called "Union of the Crowns") by combining Saint George's Cross with the Saint Andrew's Cross (the flag of Scotland). The flag was initially for maritime display, later restricted to the King's ships. Afterwards, the Saint George flag remained the flag of England for other purposes until the Acts of Union 1707. At the union, the first Union Flag became official for all purposes in the new Kingdom of Great Britain. From this time, the Saint George's Cross came to be seen as a symbol of England and Wales when used alongside symbols for Scotland or Ireland; so in the flags of the Commonwealth of England during 1649 to 1660.

The flag of Saint George is also the rank flag of an Admiral in the Royal Navy, and civilian craft are forbidden to fly it. However, surviving little ships of Dunkirk, which participated in the Dunkirk evacuation during World War II, are allowed to fly it as a jack. This is normally done in the defaced form of the Dunkirk jack.

Churches belonging to the Church of England may fly the Saint George's Cross (unless another flag is flown by custom for special reasons). The correct way for the church to fly the Saint George's cross (since an order from the Earl Marshal in 1938) is with the arms of the diocese in the upper left-hand corner of the flag.

The flag of St. George has enjoyed a resurgence in popularity since the late 20th century, partly due to football-inspired nationalism, and also in response to the devolution movements in Scotland and Wales.

=== Derived usage ===
Most of the derived usage is from the flag of England. That article has illustrations of its derivations particularly across Canada, eastern Australia, the Caribbean and the Channel Islands apart from Jersey since Guernsey commonly used the English flag from 1936 (then moved to its present variant in 1985), however the illustrations below have an extremely complex or nil derivation from that flag.

The flag of the City of London uses the St. George's Cross on a white background, with a red sword in the canton. The sword is believed to represent the sword that beheaded Saint Paul who is the patron saint of the city.

Proposed flag of the Autonomous Republic of Abkhazia

Flag of Adjara

Flag of the City of London

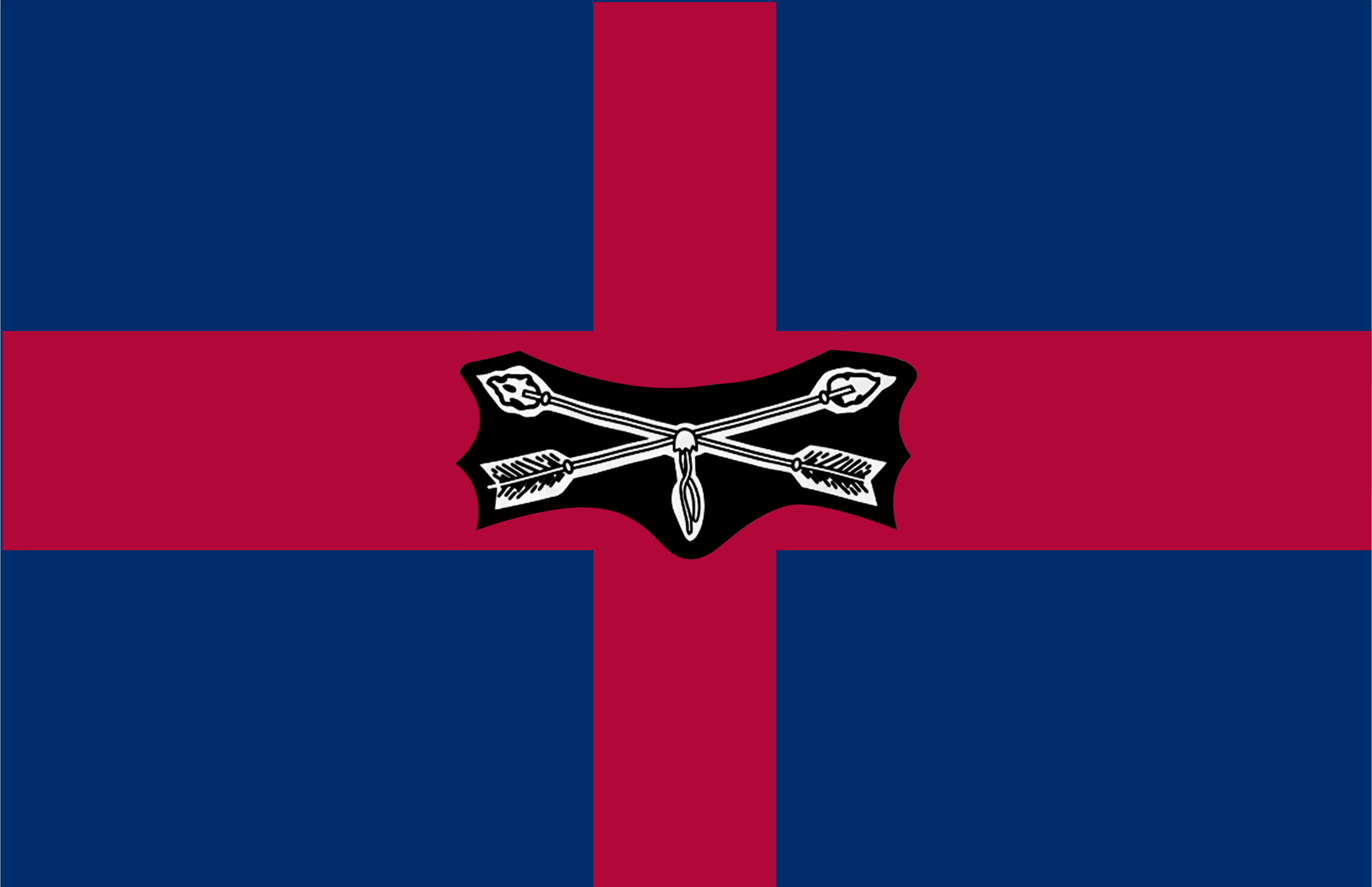
Flag of Worcester County, Maryland

== Georgia ==
Saint George is the patron saint of the nation of Georgia, and the Saint George flag was supposedly used in the 5th century by Georgian king Vakhtang Gorgasali. In the 13th century, Queen Tamar of Georgia used the Saint George flag during her campaign against Seljuk Turks. The four Jerusalem crosses were later added by King George V of Georgia, who drove out the Mongols from Georgia in 1334.

The flag fell out during the Russian annexation of Georgia and abolition of the Georgian monarchy. However, the flag was revived by the Georgian patriotic movement in the 1990s. A majority of Georgians supported the restoration of the medieval flag of Georgia, including the influential Catholicos-Patriarch of All Georgia Ilia II of the Georgian Orthodox Church. The flag was finally adopted by the Georgian parliament on 14 January 2004. It was formally endorsed by a presidential decree signed by Mikheil Saakashvili on 25 January, following his election as President of Georgia. The Georgian Navy's naval ensign also used a St. George's Cross during its existence.

== Other ==
Saint George's cross as used in Sweden and Finland

The naval ensigns of the Bahamas, Jamaica, Latvia, Saint Kitts and Nevis, South Africa, and Ukraine incorporates St. George's Crosses.
- The flag of Barcelona combines the cross of Saint George, the patron saint of Catalonia, with the traditional red and yellow bars of the Senyera, the ancient symbol of the Crown of Aragon.
- The flag of Almería, Spain, consists of a St. George's Cross.
- The crest of Royal St. George's College in Toronto, Canada, contains a St. George's Cross.
- The Coat of arms of Alberta, used in the flag of Alberta, features a St. George's Cross.
- The Indian naval flag used to feature a St. George Cross until it was removed in 2022
- Both the flag of Sardinia and the flag of Corsica are derived from the Four Moors flag, also known as the "Cross of Alcoraz". This consists of a red cross of Saint George on a white background with a maure (moor's head) in each quarter. This is also found in the flag of Aragon, (Spain), and is based on a war flag of the Reconquista following the Battle of Alcoraz in 1096.
- The flag and arms of Freiburg im Breisgau, Germany, consist of a St. George's Cross, as St. George is one of the city's patron saints.
- In Sweden, the term "Saint George's cross" sometimes refers to the Cross pattée used by Swedish Freemasons. For example, the cross of the Swedish Order of Freemasons was defined by the King of Sweden in 1928 to be a "red St. George's cross with triangular arms".
- In Finland, the Cross pattée is called Yrjön risti, "George's cross", while the red cross on a white background is called Pyhän Yrjön risti, "Saint George's cross".
- Some British Commonwealth countries used the St. George's Cross on their naval ensigns, namely the Bahamas, Jamaica, Saint Kitts and Nevis and South Africa.
- The naval jack of Italy contains a St. George's Cross on the second quarter.
- Naval flags of Latvia, contain a St. George's Cross coloured in the same pattern as the Latvian national flag.
- Depicted on the trumpet banner of the Angel from the Judgement card in the Tarot Deck.
- The naval ensign of Ukraine contains a St. George's Cross.
- On the canton of the flags used by the Northern Ireland Loyalist paramilitary organisation the Ulster Volunteer Force and its affiliated group the Red Hand Commando.

== Notes ==
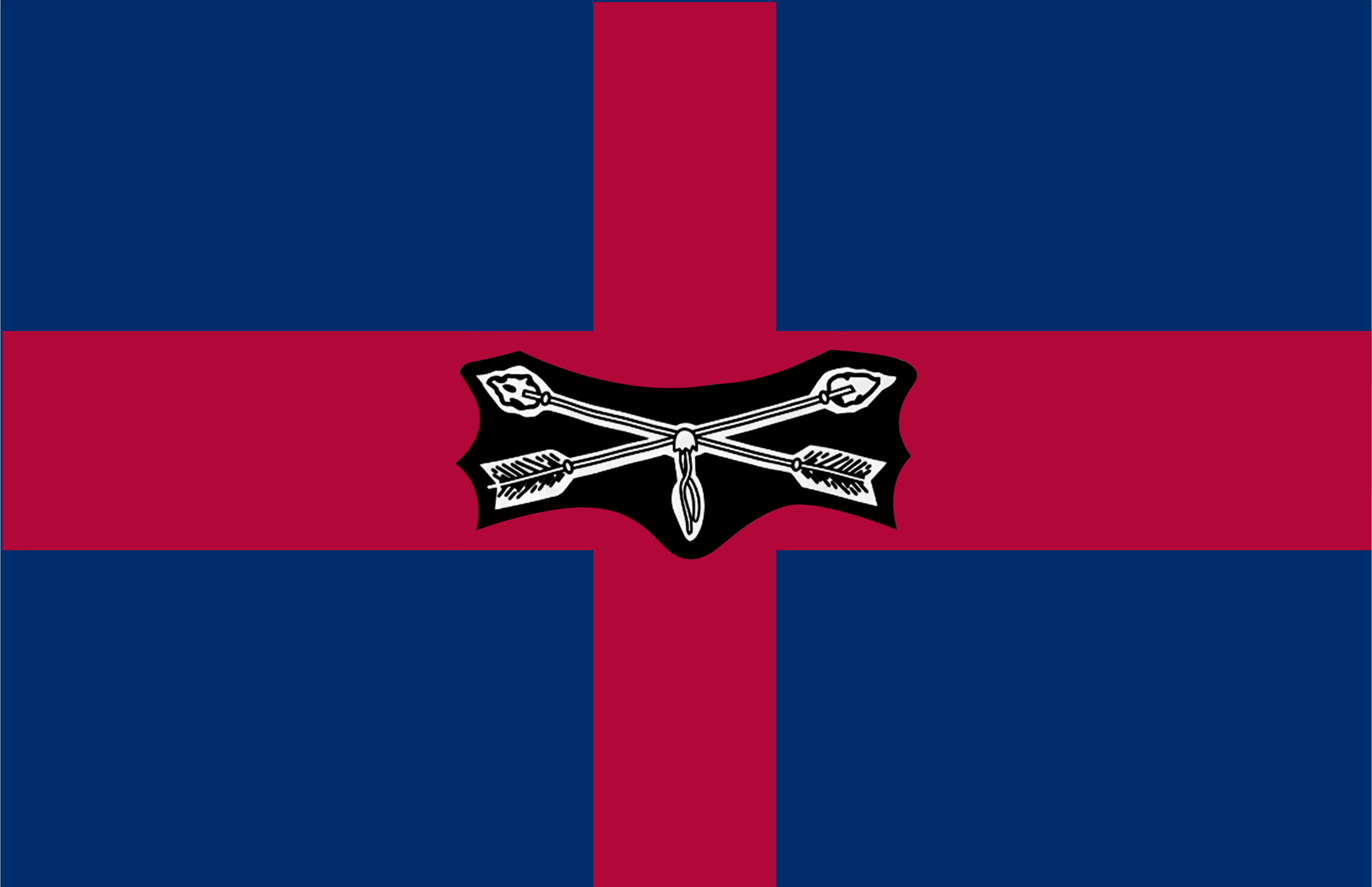
The Worcester County MD flag also uses the St. Georges Cross, though it is on a blue background.
