= Flag of Sardinia =

Flag of the Sardinia region, in Italy

Sardinia
- The four Moors
- Use: Civil and state flag
- Proportion: 3:5 or 2:3
- Adopted: Used since 1281; current version adopted on 15 April 1999
- Design: Four moors head in St. George's cross

The flag of Sardinia, (Note: Sardinian: bandera de sa Sardigna, bandera sarda, Sa pandhela de sa Sarđhinna) also referred to as the Four Moors, (Note: Italian: I quattro mori; Sardinian: Sos bator moros / Is cuatru morus) represents and symbolizes the island of Sardinia (Italy) and its people. It was also the historical flag and coat of arms of the Aragonese, then Spanish, and later Savoyard Kingdom of Sardinia. It was first officially adopted by the autonomous region in 1950 with a revision in 1999, describing it as a "white field with a red cross and a bandaged Moor's head facing away from the hoist (the edge close to the mast) in each quarter" (Regional Law 15 April 1999, n. 10, Art. 1).

The flag is composed of the St George's Cross and four heads of Moors, which in the past may not have been forehead bandaged but blindfolded and turned towards the hoist. But already well-preserved pictures from the 16th century clearly show a forehead bandage (see gallery below). The most accepted hypothesis is that the heads represented the heads of Moorish princes defeated by the Aragonese, as for the first time they appeared in the 13th-century seals of the Crown of Aragon – although with a beard and no bandage, contrary to the Moors of the Sardinian flag, which appeared for the first time in a manuscript of the second half of the 14th century.

== History ==
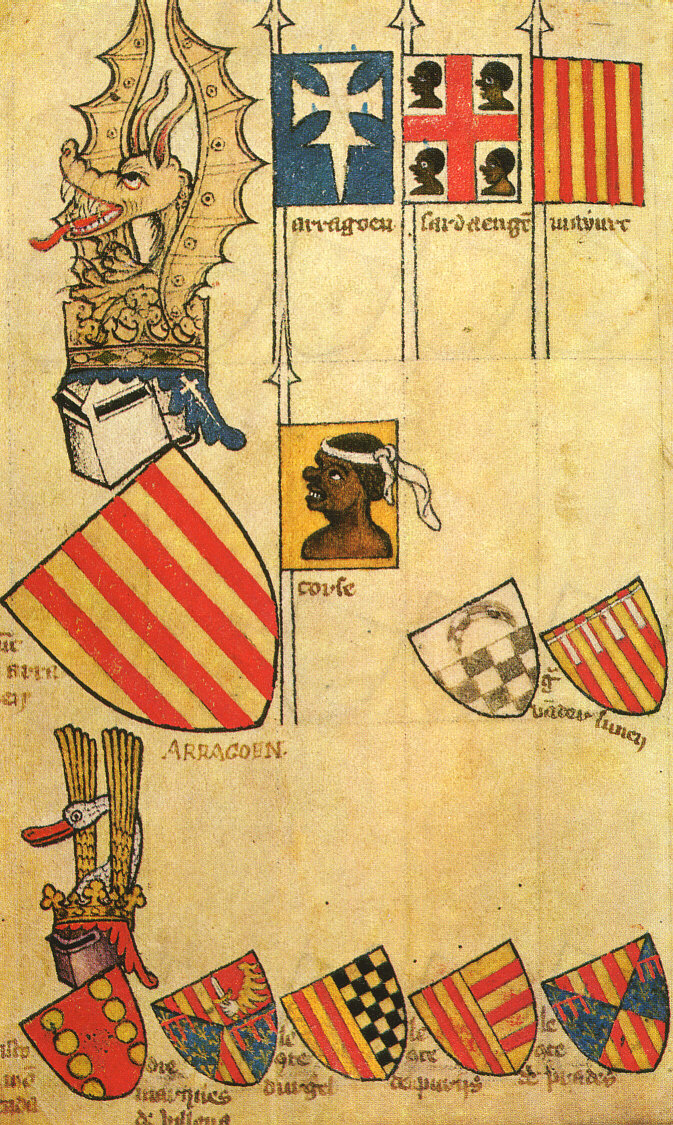
First testimony of the flag of Sardinia. Manuscript of Gelre, the second half of the fourteenth century, Folio 62r

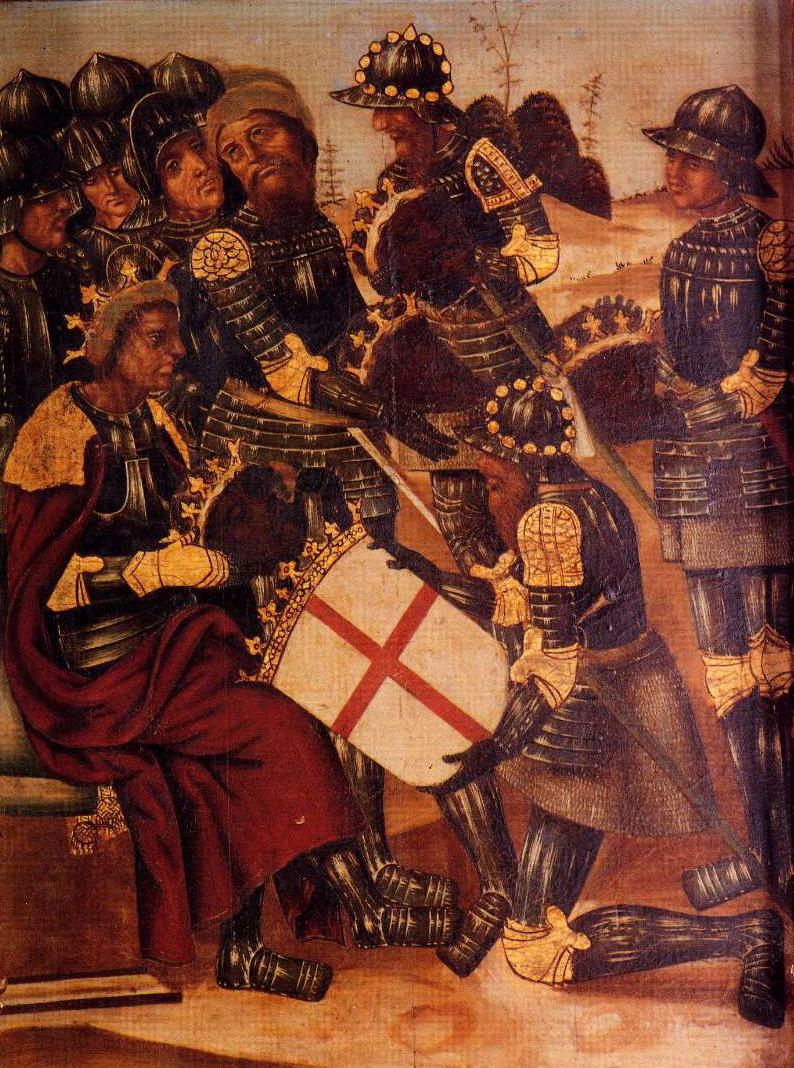
Peter I of Aragon receiving a shield emblazoned with the Cross of Saint George. According to legend, George appeared on the field of battle at Alcoraz. The heads of four Moors found on the battlefield were added to George's familiar emblem, creating the Cross of Alcoraz.

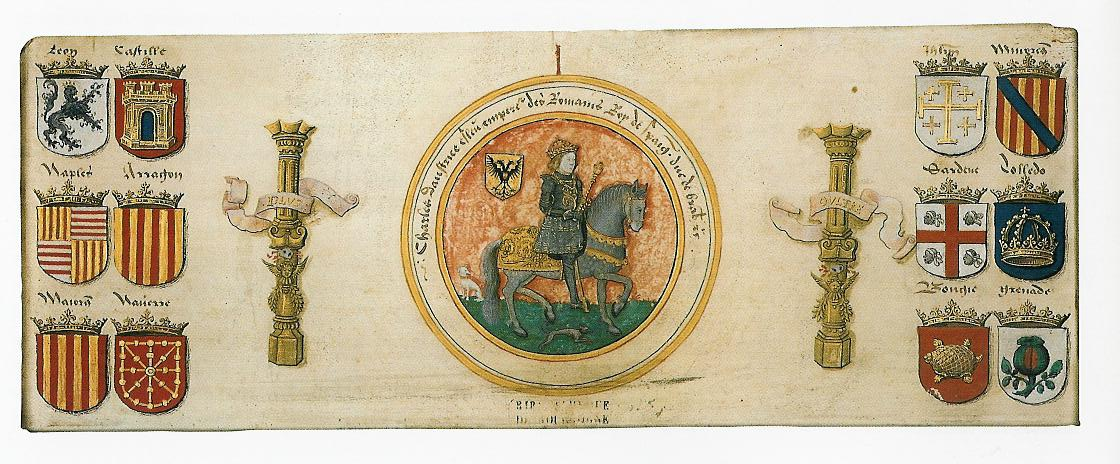
Charles V and his Kingdoms' coats of arms

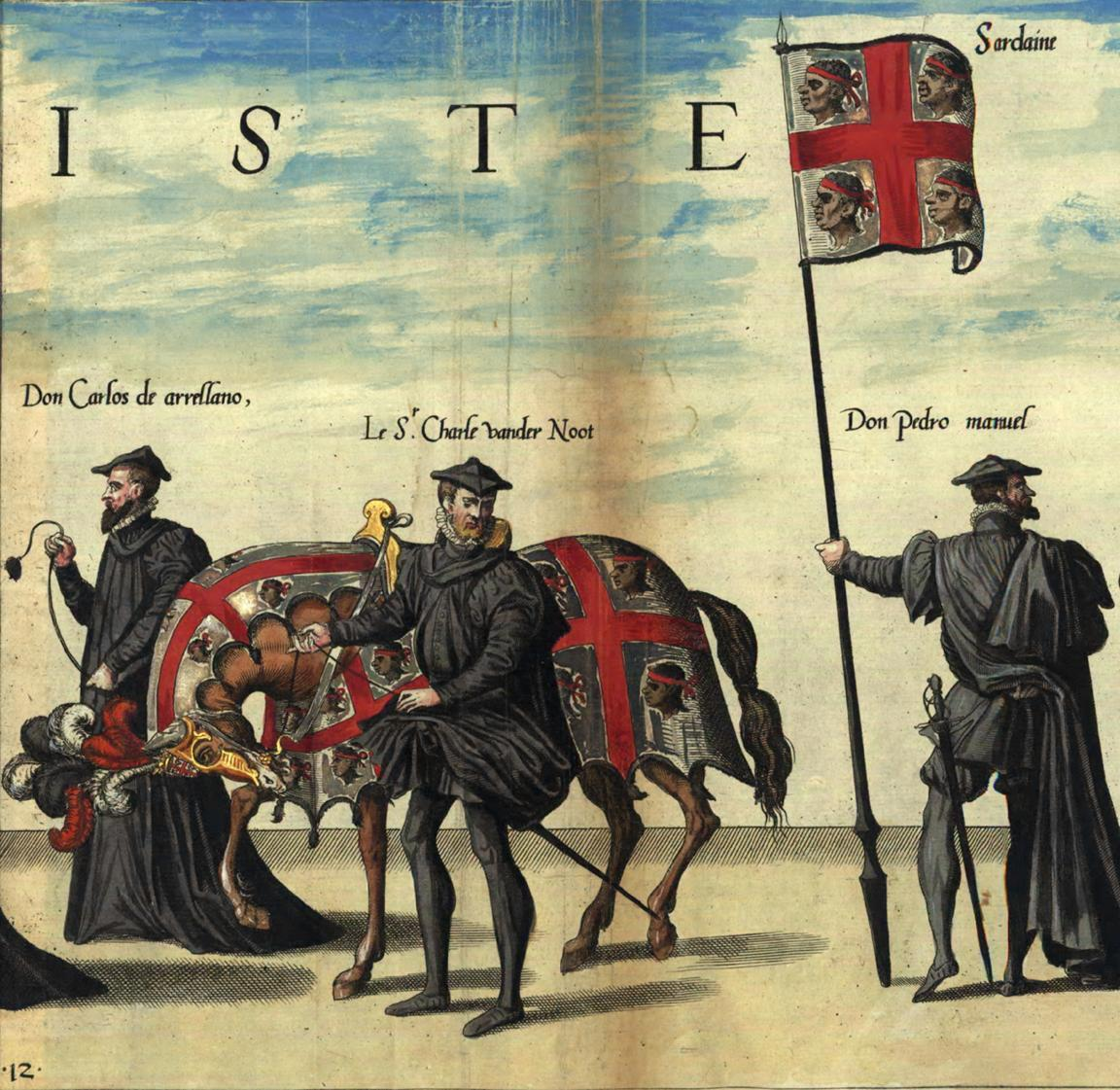
16th-century flag, from Procession and Funeral of Charles V

Painting of the cloth that covered the bench or table of the Consulate of Catalans in the city of Naples in 1681 (known as the Heraldic Apotheosis) Museum of the History of Barcelona. Sardinia's depiction of the Four Moors is different from those of Aragon: the former has only the bandage on his forehead, and the latter is crowned and bearded.

The oldest certified heraldic symbol of the cross of Saint George with four Moors in each quarter, known as the Cross of Alcoraz, dates back to 1281 and was used by the Royal Chancellery of Peter III of Aragon as the king's coat of arms upon seals. In the 13th century, the Moors' heads had no head bandages and were bearded; the coat of arms of Sardinia never appeared in such a way.

After the kingdom of Sardinia was founded in 1326, it became part of the Crown of Aragon; these seals will come to closing documents of King James II (1326), Alfonso Benigno (1327–1336) and Peter I (1336–1387). Some specimens are preserved in the Historical Archive of the city of Cagliari. The late 14th century Gelre Armorial attributes the Four Moors to the Kingdom of Sardinia in the states of the Crown of Aragon. It is found in another Armorial perhaps from the Lorraine area (preserved in the National Library of France) and of uncertain date but certainly in the 15th century. In 1509, in another Portuguese Armorial Book (Livro do Armeiro-mor), Sardinia is represented only with the cross of St. George.

The Four Moors begin to be used consistently as a symbol of the Kingdom of Sardinia during the time of the Catholic Monarchs, and especially from the time of the Emperor Charles V. In Sardinia, the first safe attestation of the coat of arms is on the cover of the Acts of the military arm of the Sardinian Parliament, the Capitols de Cort del Stament Militar de Serdenya printed in Cagliari in 1591. Throughout the period of the Iberian monarchies, the original design of the bandages on his forehead was respected.

The design with blindfolded Moors facing the left first appeared in 1800, after Sardinia passed to the House of Savoy. It was either due to a mistake of a copyist or, similarly to the flag of Corsica during the earlier period of French rule, a deliberate protest against the mainland rulers. It became the official flag of the region under a decree of 5 July 1952. In 1999, a special regional law changed the flag from the version adopted under Savoy rule to the original one.

== Legendary origin ==
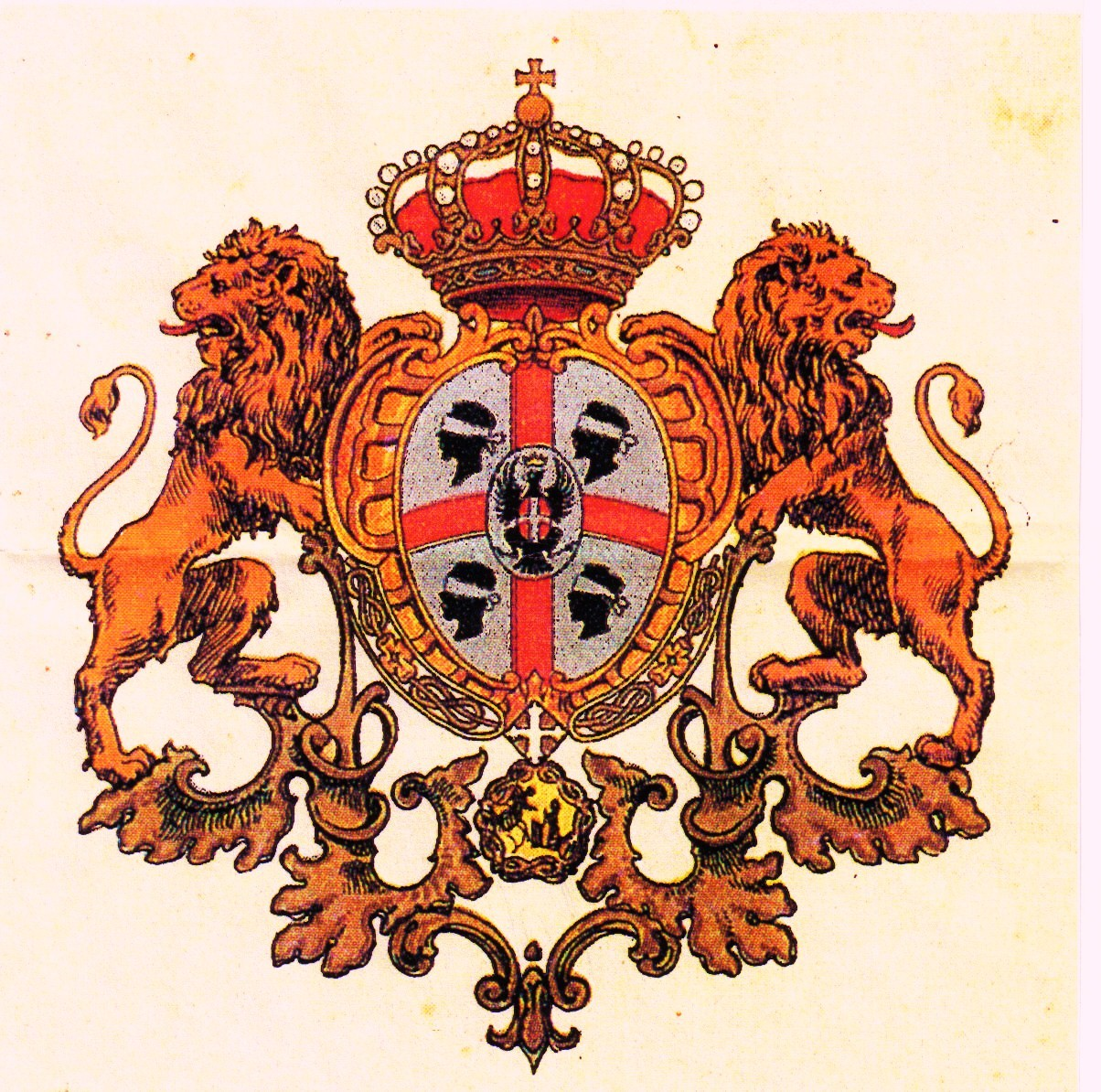
20th-century coat of arms adopted by the Brigata Sassari, the Sardinian soldier brigade during World War I

There are separate Spanish and Sardinian traditions to explain the origin of the flag and there is no consensus among scholars as to which is correct. According to the Spanish tradition, it was a creation of King Peter I of Aragon, celebrating his victory at the Battle of Alcoraz in 1096. It was said that St. George miraculously appeared on the field of battle and there were four severed heads of Saracen kings at the end; thus the red cross and white background of the St George's Cross and the heads of four Moors. The Sardinian-Pisan tradition attributes the arms to a banner given by Pope Benedict VIII to the Pisans in aid of the Sardinians in a conflict with the Saracens of Musetto who were trying to conquer the Italian peninsula and Sardinia. This flag, however, has inverted colors and no heads on it.

Before the Kingdom of Sardinia was founded, the rulers of the island were known as archons (ἄρχοντες in Greek) or judges (iudices in Latin, judikes in Sardinian, giudici in Italian). The island was organized into one iudicatus from the 9th century on (see List of monarchs of Sardinia). After the Muslim conquest of Sicily in the 9th century, the Byzantines, who previously ruled Sardinia, couldn't manage to defend their far west province. Probably, a local noble family acceded to power, still identifying themselves as a vassal of the Byzantines, but independent "de facto", as communications with Constantinople were very difficult. At the beginning of the 11th century, an attempt to conquer the island was made by Spanish Muslims. Very little is known of that war, being recorded only by Pisan and Genoese chronicles. Christians won, but after that, the previous Sardinian kingdom was totally undermined and divided into four smaller judicates: Cagliari, Arborea, Gallura, and Torres or Logudoro; each one developed its own coat of arms. When, with the appointment of the King of Aragon as King of Sardinia, the island again became one united kingdom, only the Judicatus of Arborea survived and fought for a century against the Kingdom of Sardinia for supremacy.

According to some, the flag derives from Alcoraz's victory of 1096, is linked to the Crown of Aragon, and represents the Spanish Reconquista against the Moors who occupied most of the Iberian Peninsula. It is composed of the cross of St. George, also a symbol of the Crusaders fighting at the same time in the Holy Land, and the four severed heads, representing four major victories in Spain by the Aragonese: the reconquest of Zaragoza, Valencia, Murcia, and the Balearic Islands. According to others (Mario Valdes y Cocom), the Moors represent the Egyptian Saint Maurice, martyred under Diocletian, and are shown in this manner, with the heads bandaged, in countless coats of arms in the Franco-German area. Even Saint Victor of Marseilles, who was from the same Theban Legion commanded by Maurice and escaped the decimation, is represented by a black Moor with a bandage on his forehead, as in the High Altar of St. Nicholas' Church of Tallinn, now in the Art Museum of Estonia, Tallinn. The common tradition which links the stories of the two saints suggests that the symbol was designed between the St. Maurice Abbey Canton of Valais (Switzerland) and the Abbey of St. Victor in Marseilles; each was built in the place of martyrdom of the respective saint. Between 1112 and 1166 the County of Provence was under the direct control of the kings of Aragon, and until 1245 ruled by descendants of the same dynasty. The abbey of St. Victor of Marseilles had extensive property and political influence in Sardinia, especially in the Judicatus (kingdom) of Cagliari, from the 11th to the 13th century. There are hagiographies of many "Saint Victors" related to the Theban Legion, such as Viktor of Xanten or Victor of Solothurn and to the persecutions of Diocletian and Maximinus II as Victor Maurus of Milan, Victor of Puigcerdà, Spain, probably inspired by the same martyr.

The four Moors became the symbol of the Kingdom of Sardinia at its foundation, with the Corsican flag dating back to the same era, and became in time the flag of the island and its people. In any case, the meaning of the symbols, either two holy warriors or Moor's heads cut off, makes it an emblem of warring Christianity, crusader in the broad sense of the term, originated in a historical period of bitter conflict between Islam and Christianity, in which Sardinia was fully involved.

== Modern use ==
Coat of arms of the Autonomous Region of Sardinia, with eye-blinded bandage.

The symbol was adopted as the regional coat of arms already in 1950, with a decree of the President of the Republic. The flag, instead, became official only in 1999, by means of Regional Law n. 10.

== Chronological gallery ==
Under the Crown of Aragon

The four moors already represent the Kingdom of Sardinia but no trace is found on the island.

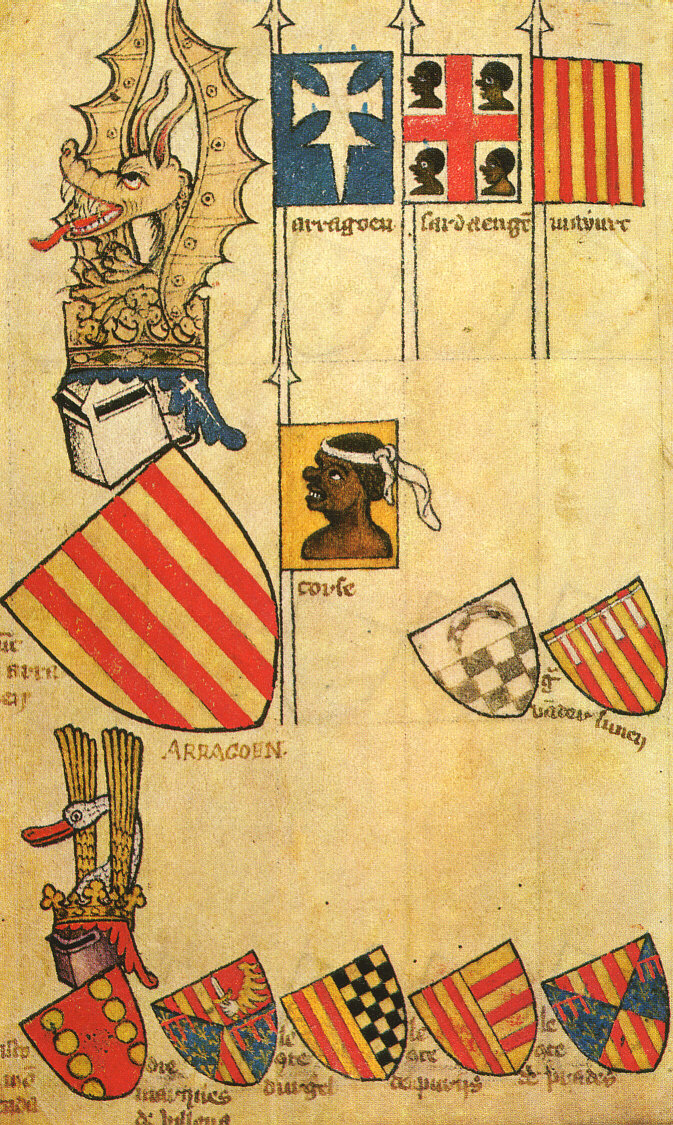
Gelre Armorial, Folio 62r

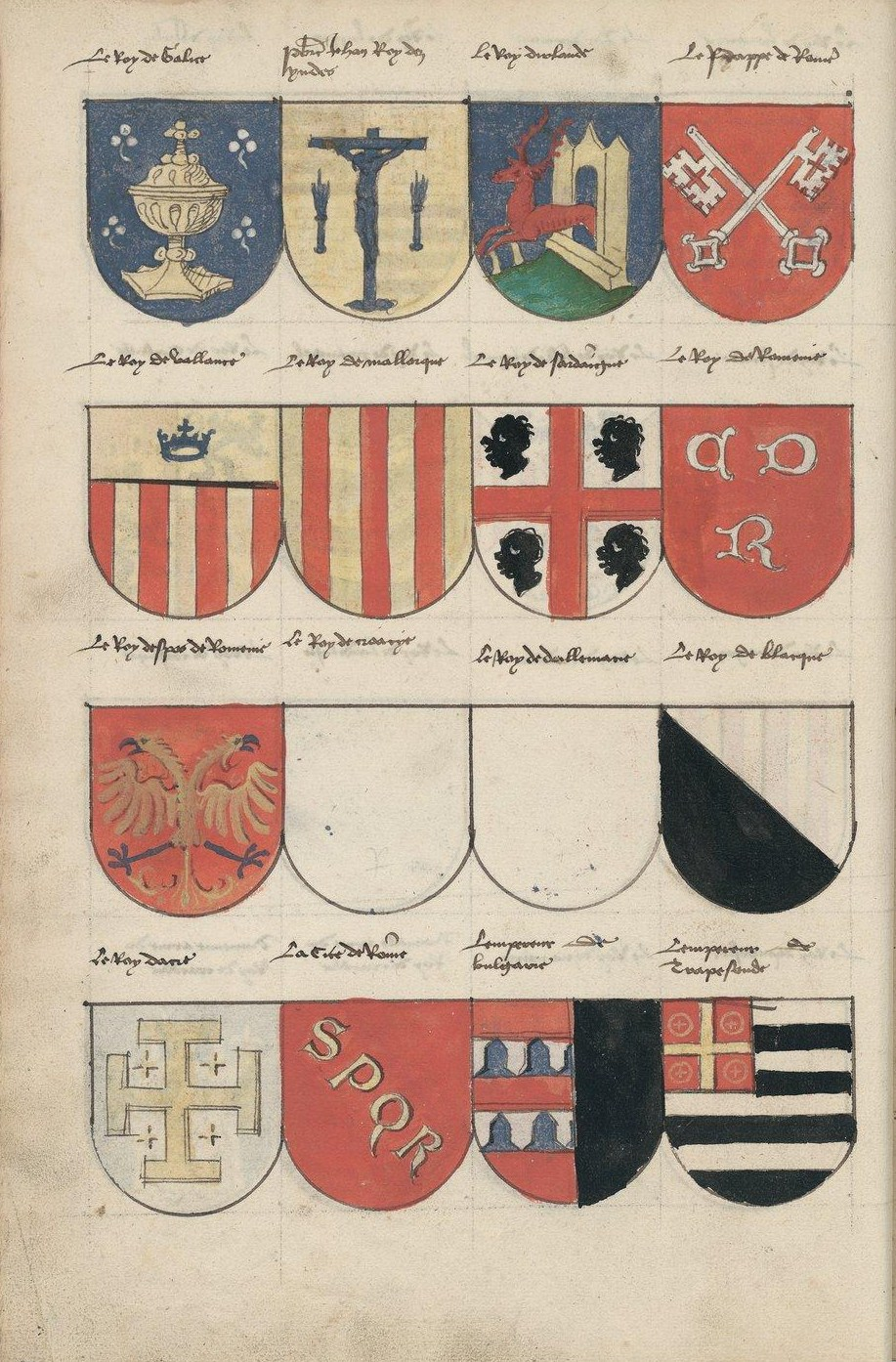
Armorial from Lorraine region (France), 1450

Imperial heraldry under the reign of Charles V of Habsburg

The four moors appear more frequently in prints, paintings, and artifacts both in Sardinia and in all publications heraldic vintage.

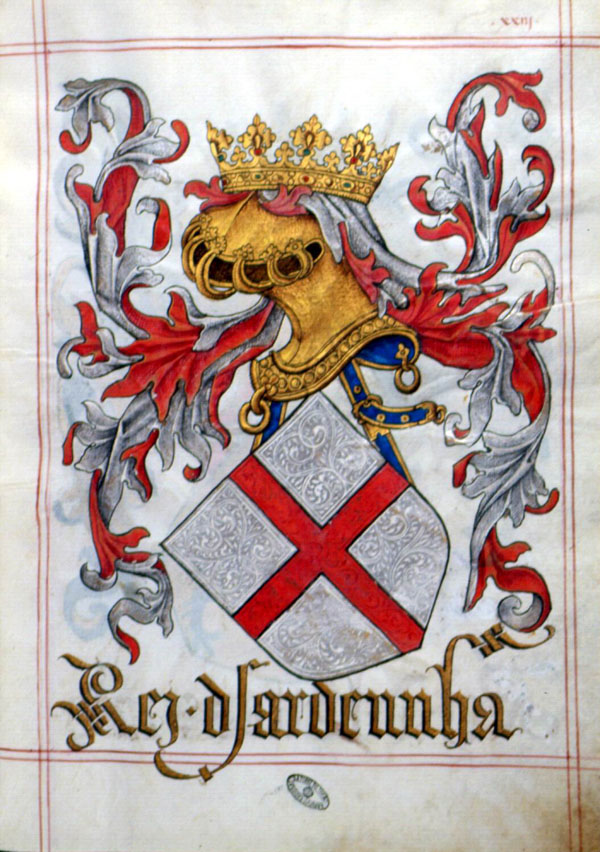
1509, Portuguese armorial "Livro do armeiro-mor", Lisbon

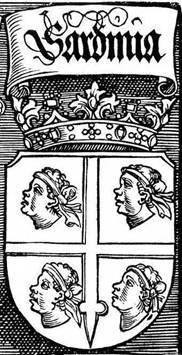
1515 from the emperor Maximilian I Triumphal Arch by Albrecht Durer

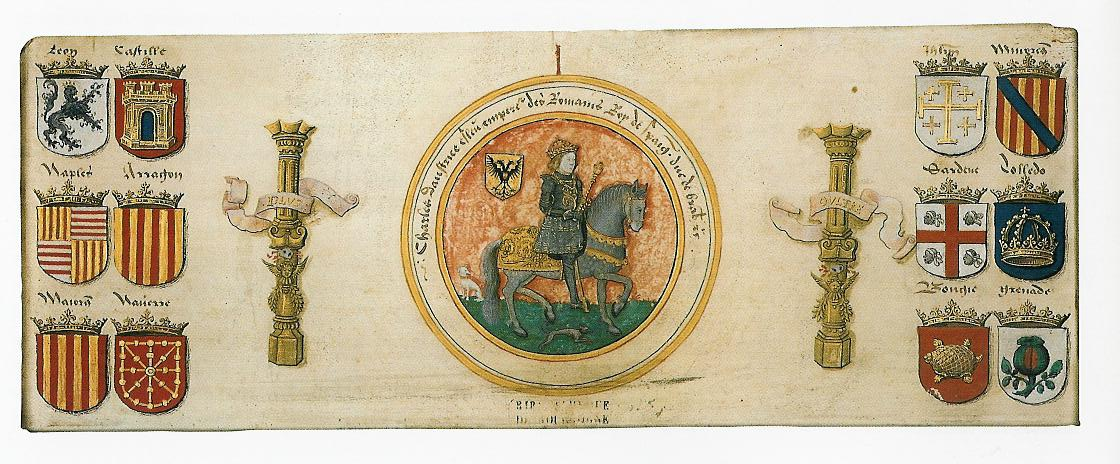
Emperor Charles V and his Kingdoms' coats of arms

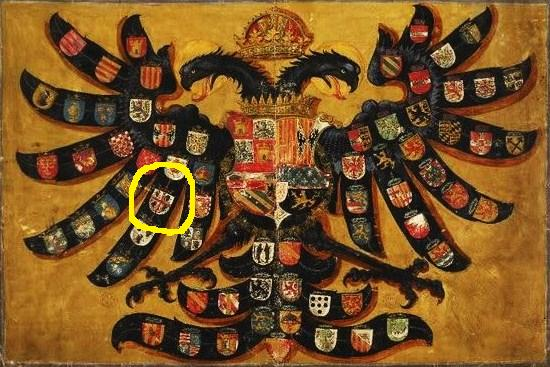
Imperial eagle of Charles V

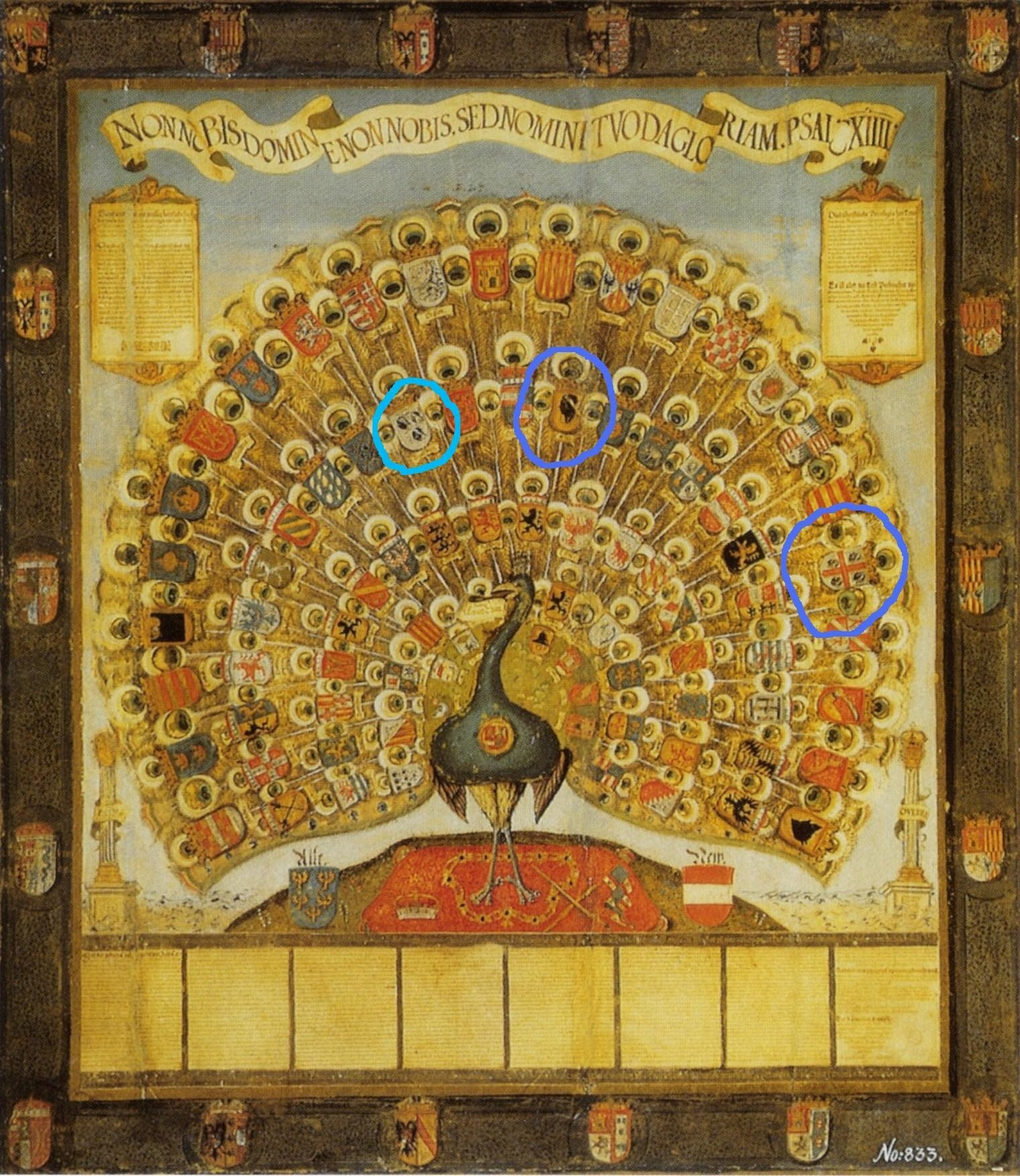
1555 - Innsbruck, the peacock of the Habsburg dynasty

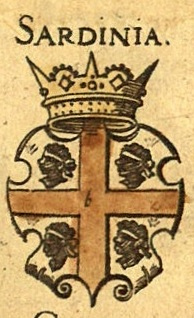
1555 Virgil Solis

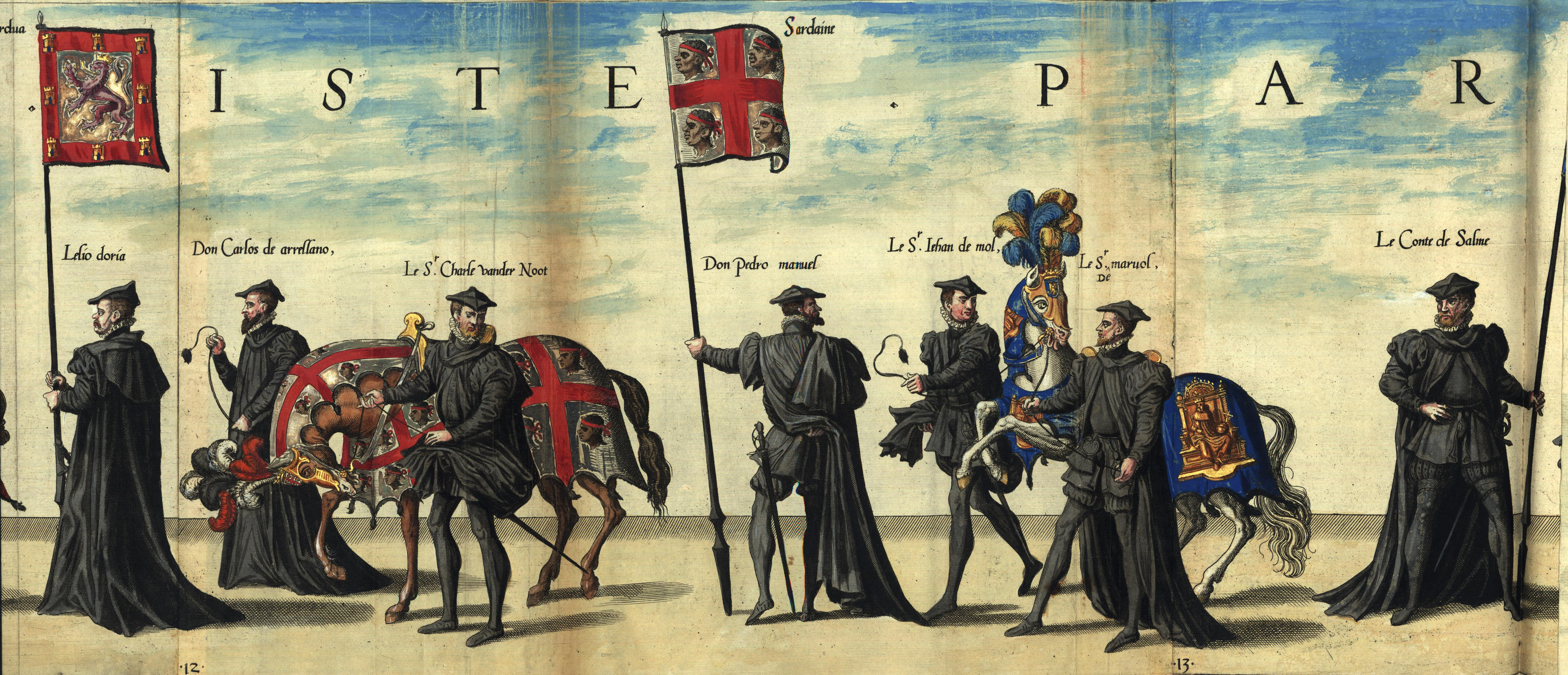
1559 H. Cock-J. Doetichum-L. Doetichum, “La magnifique et somptueuse pompe funebre faite aus obseques et funerailles du tres grande et tres victorieus empereur Charles cinquieme”, Plantin, Anvers, The funeral cortège of Charles V in a printed book.

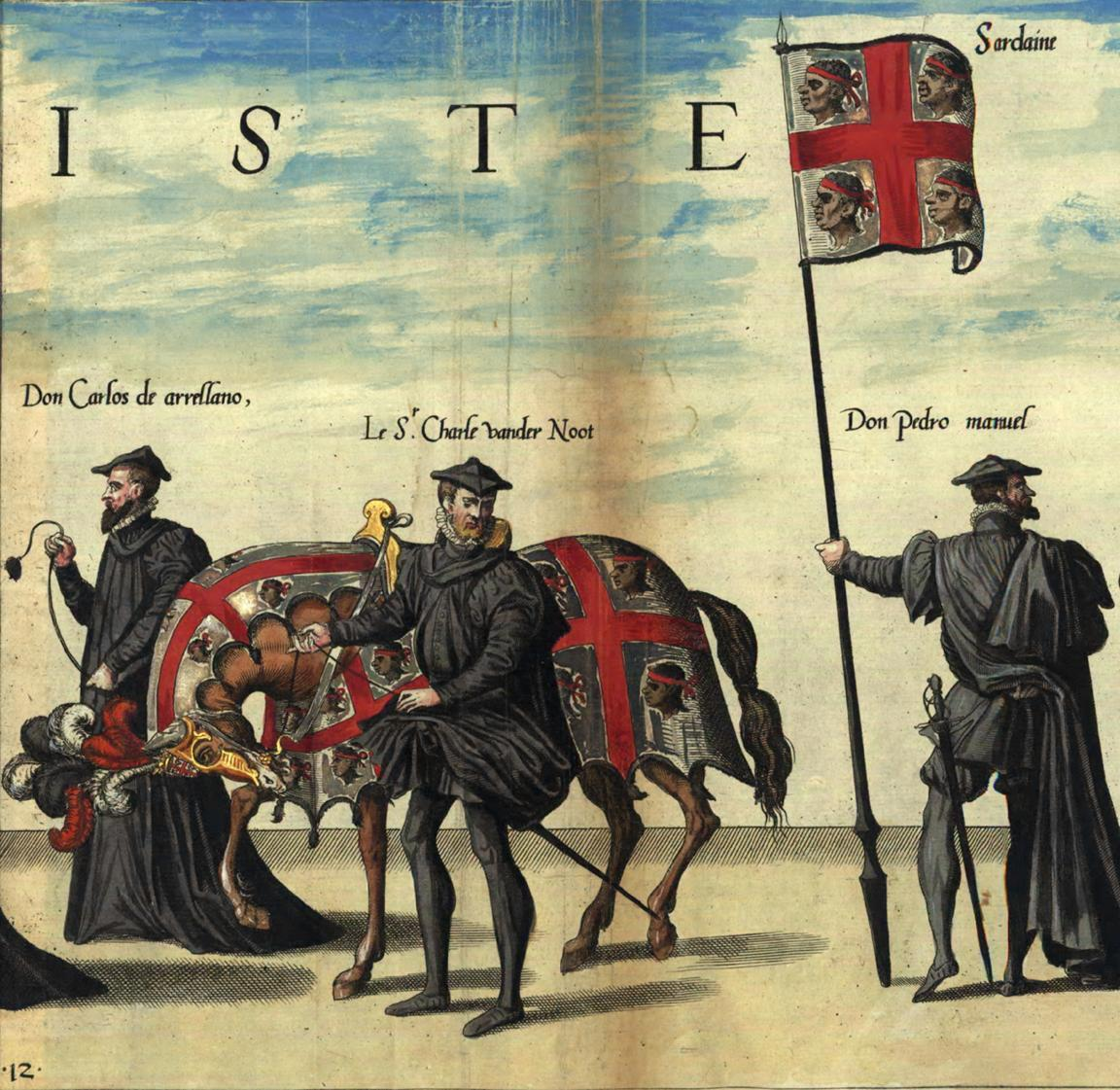
detail

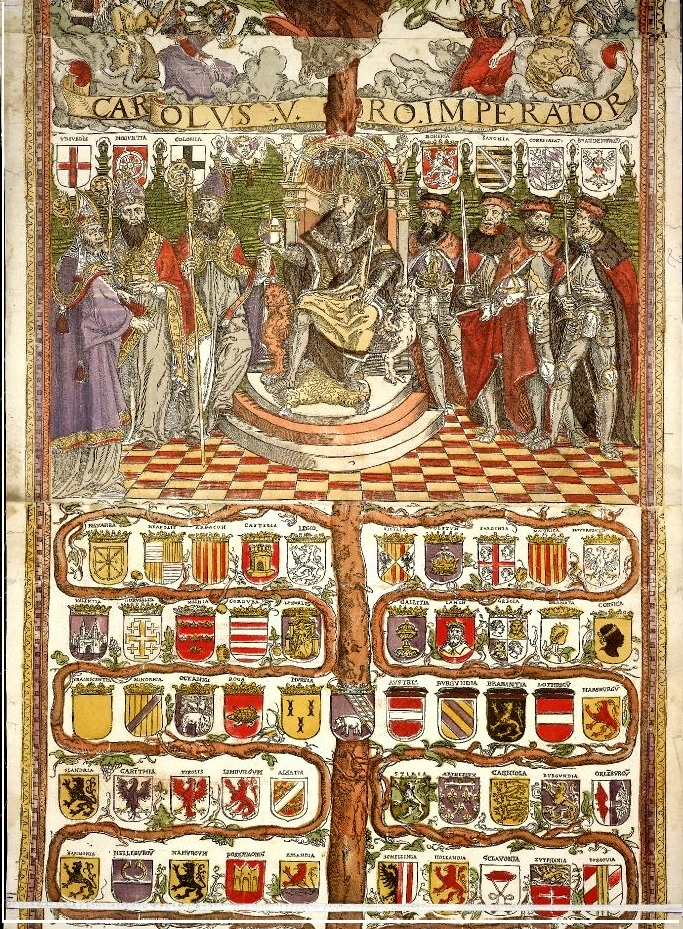
The Genealogical Tree of the House of Habsburg, Robert Peril, 1540

Under the House of Habsburg (Spanish branch)

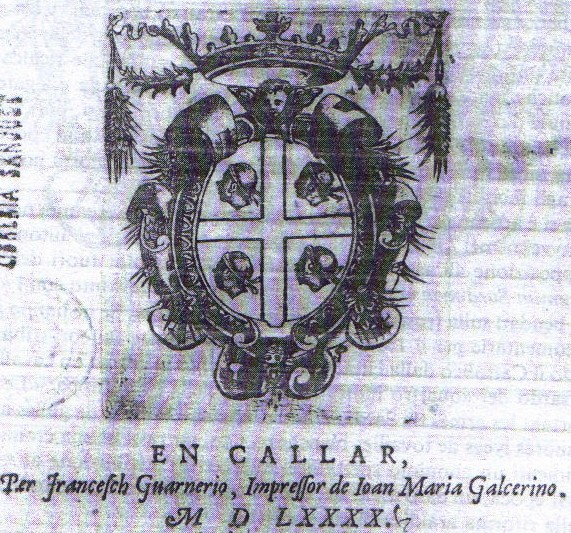
1590 F. Guarnerio, Capitols de cort del Stament Militar de Sardenya, Cagliari, first recorded use in Sardinia.

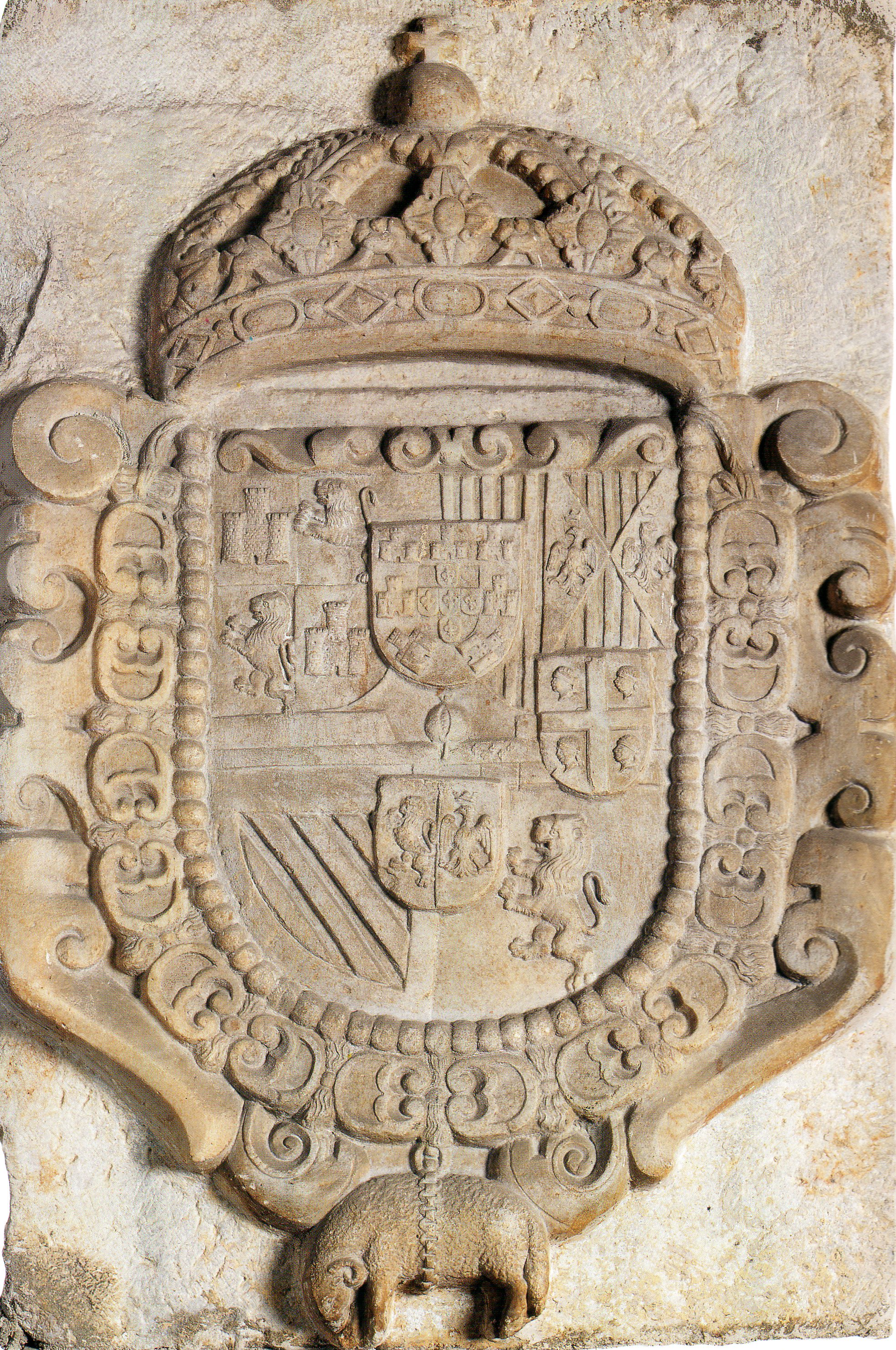
16th century, Sassari (Sardinia), Palazzo Ducale, coat of arms of Philip II of Spain

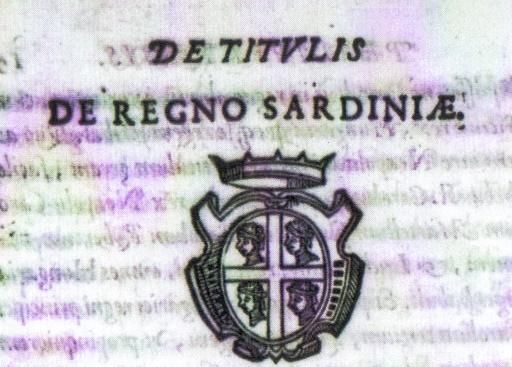
1573 I. Mainoldi Galerati, De titulis Philippi Austrii Regis Cattolici Liber, Bononia

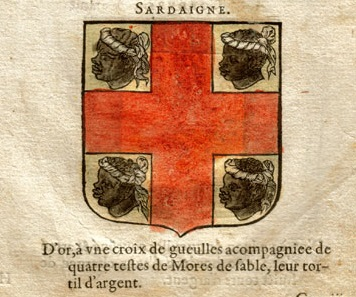
H. De Bara, Le Blason des Armoires, Lyon

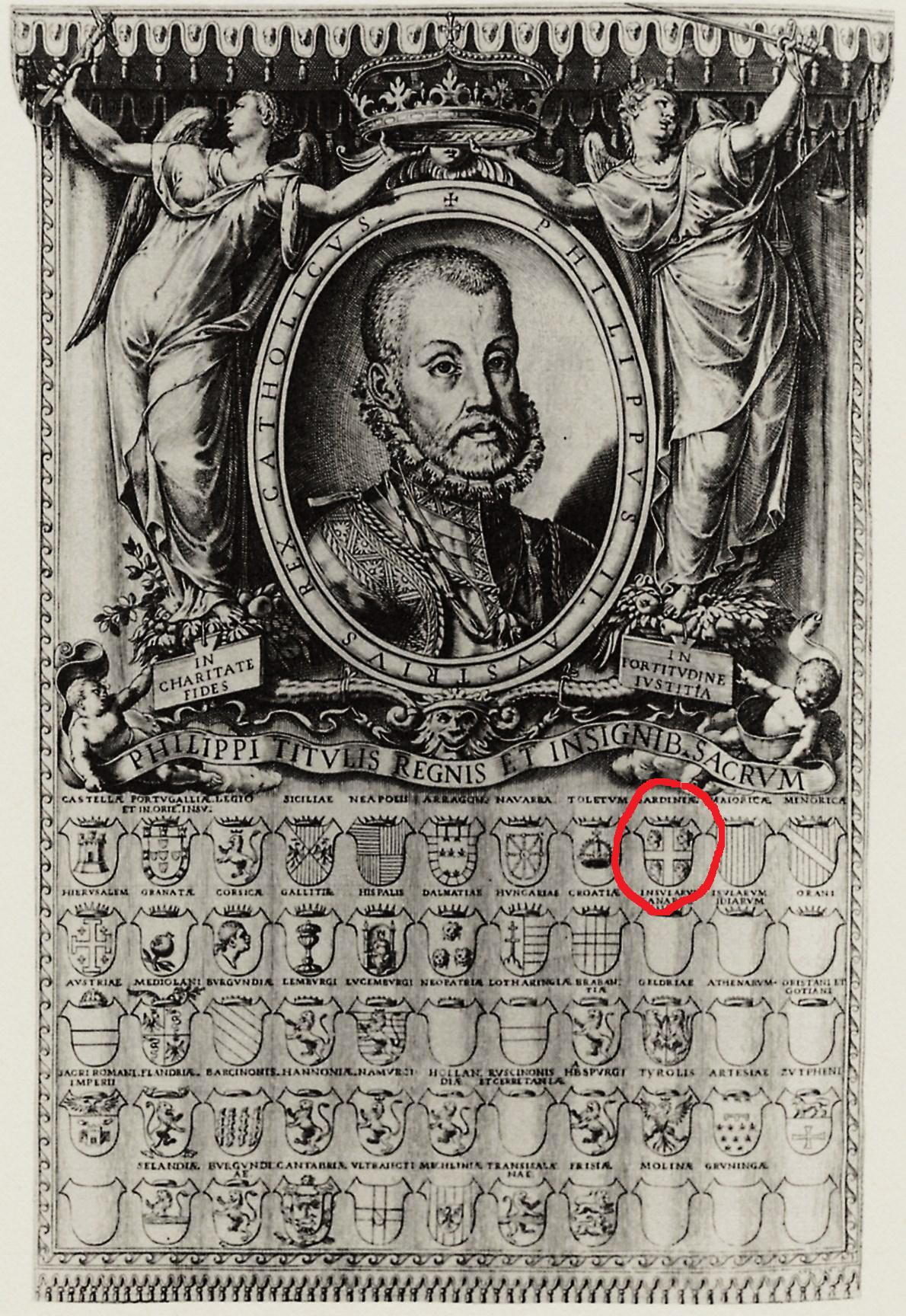
1585, portrait of Philipo II of Spain by Agostino Carracci

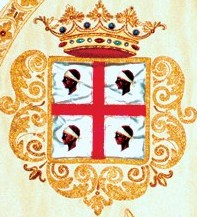
1607, coat of arms of the University of Cagliari

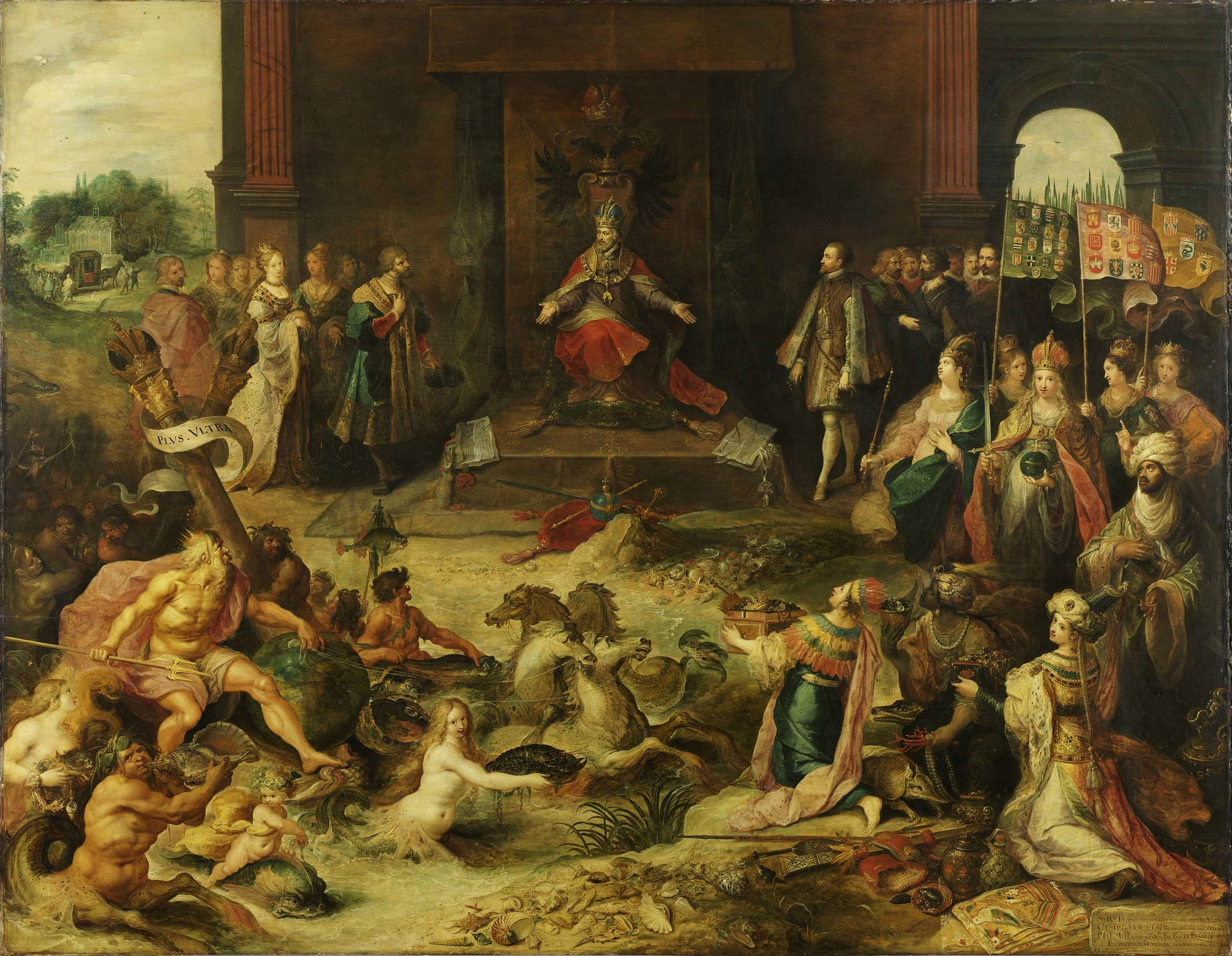
Frans Franken II (1581-1642), Abdication of the emperor Charles V, Rijksmuseum, Amsterdam

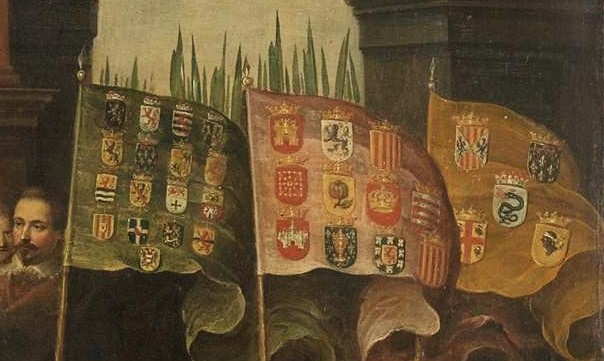
detail

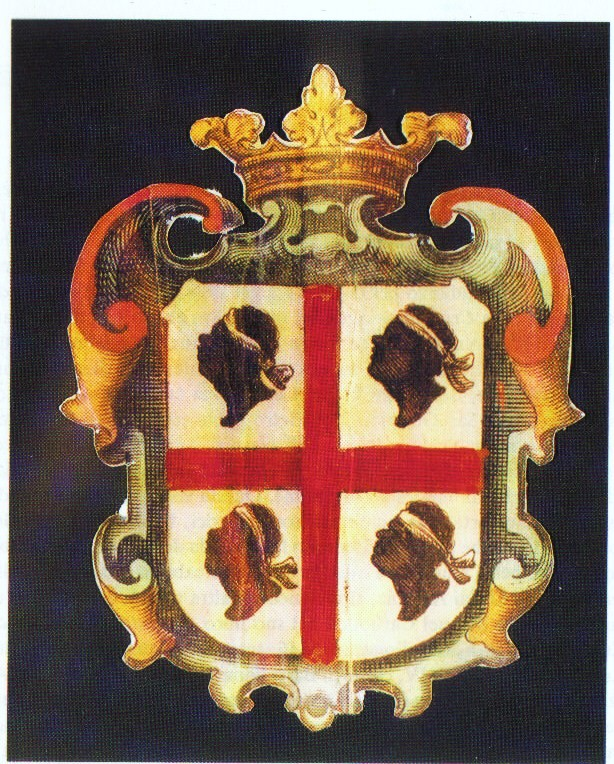
1640 from a geographic map

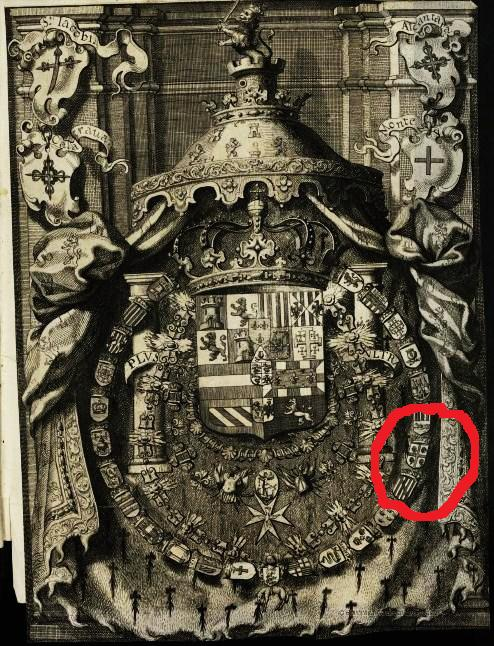
1700, Descripciones de todos los reyes de España, Josè Delitala y Castelvì, conde de Villasalto

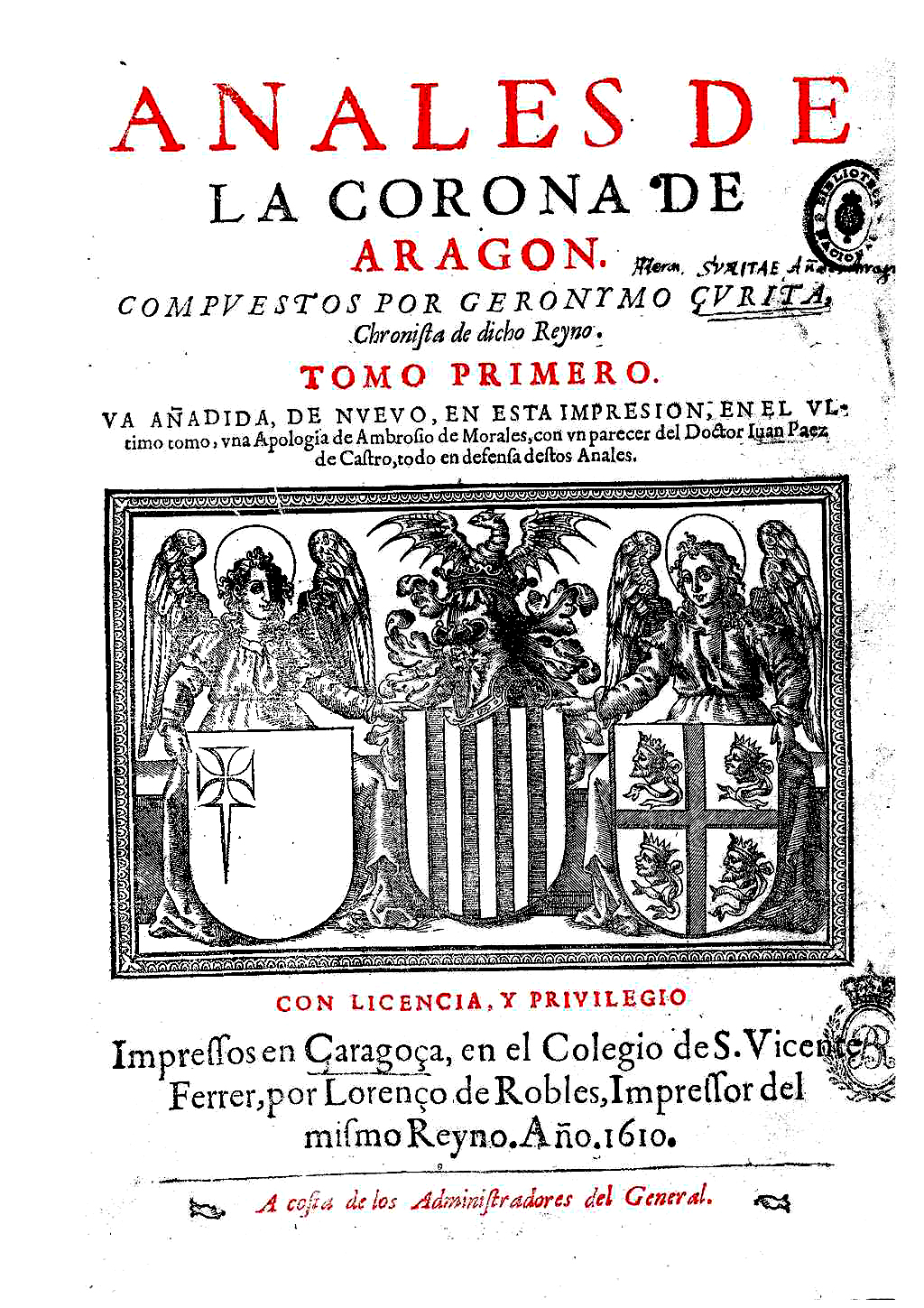
Portada de los Anales de la Corona de Aragón. The four moors became the coat of arms of Aragon as well, crowned and bearded.

Painting of the cloth that covered the bench or table of the Consulate of Catalans in the city of Naples in 1681 (known as the Apoteosi heràldica) Museu d'Història de la Ciutat, Barcelona; the iconography of the 4 Sardinian Moors are clearly from the 4 Moors of Aragon, crowned and bearded.

Depictions made outside of Sardinia itself

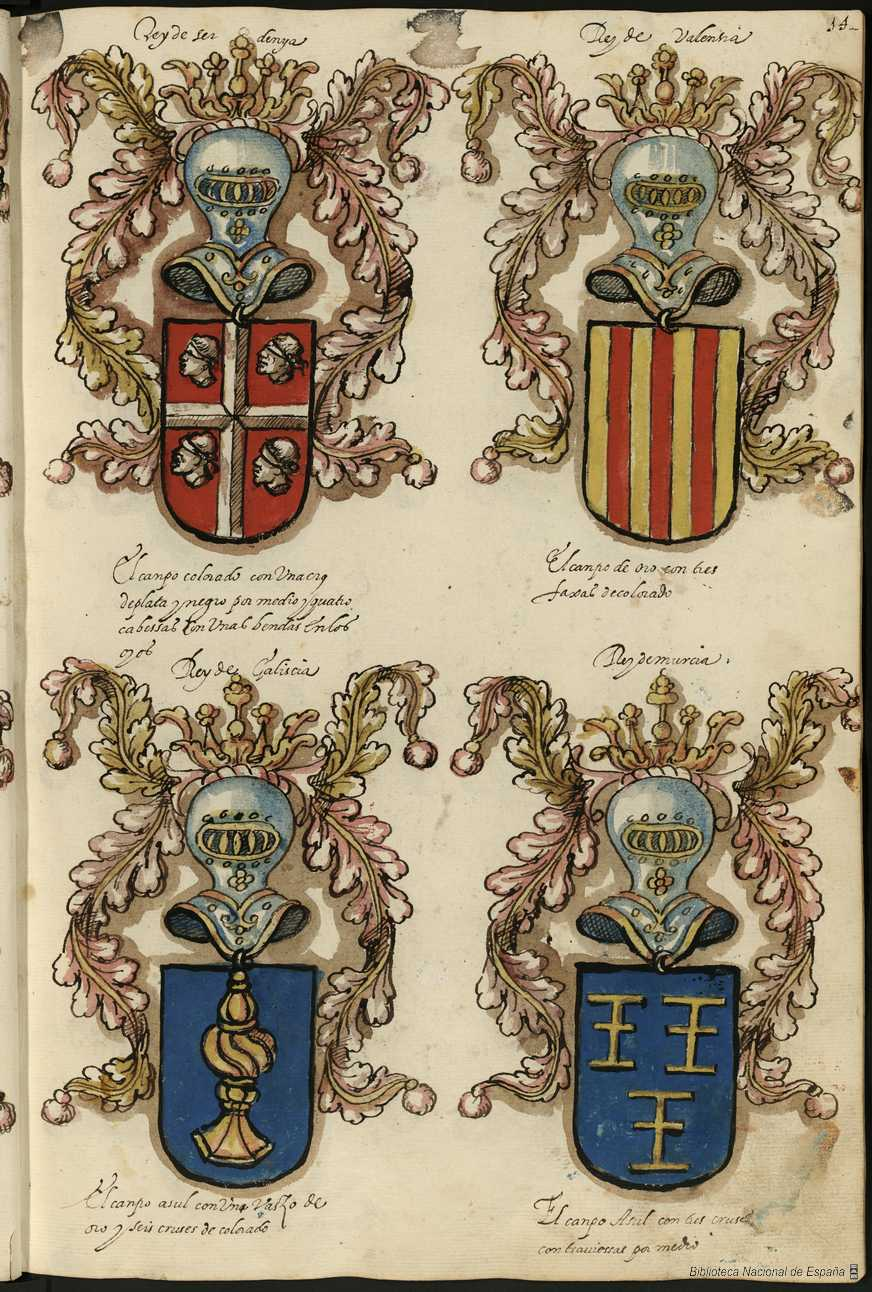
16th century, "Libro de armas y blasones de diversos linajes y retratos", with inverted colours.

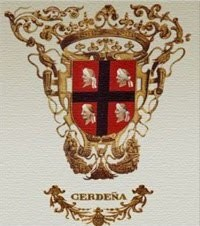
1635, Zurbaran and Velasquez, Buen Retiro Palace, Madrid, again inverted colors

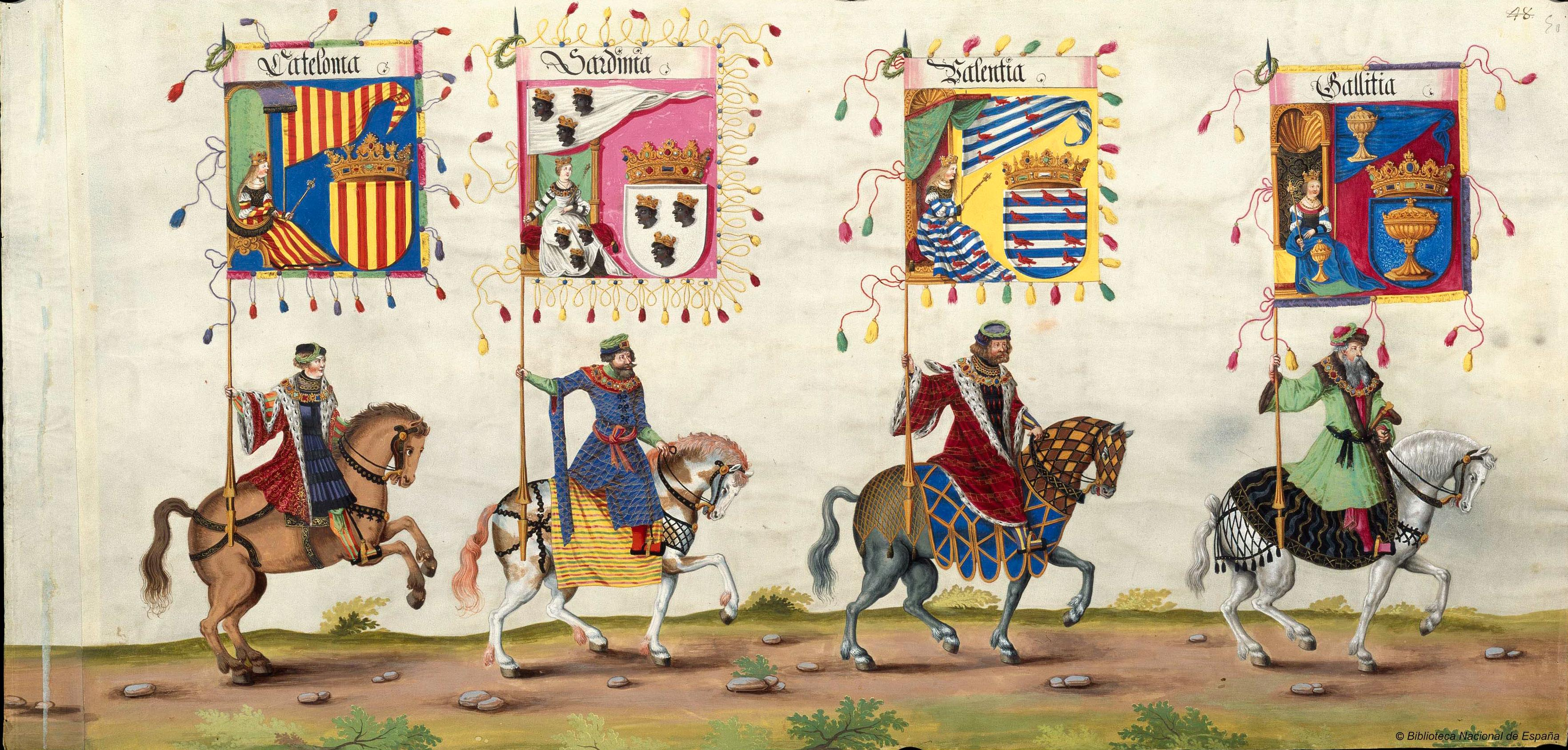
"El Triunfo del Emperador Maximiliano I", 17th century ? the four moors became three in a printed book from the Austrian area.

Under the House of Savoy

As the title of King of Sardinia was the only one who gave the ruling dynasty the coveted title, the coat of arms is enhanced and developed and overlaid with emblems of the other states ruled by the Savoy House

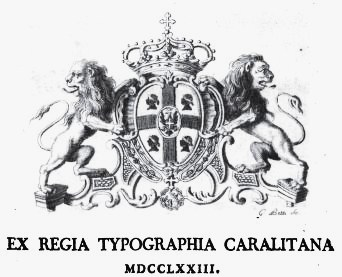
1773, I. G. Palietti, Pharmacopoea sardoa, Tipografia Regia, Cagliari

Civil Flag and Civil Ensign of the Kingdom of Sardinia (1816-1848)

Variant flag used as naval ensign in the late 18th or early 19th century

Modern Region

de facto flag of 1995

== See also ==
- Flag of Corsica
- Maure

== Sources ==
- Giovanni Battista Fara, De Rebus Sardois, Cagliari, 1580
- Geronimo Zurita, Anales de la Corona de Aragon, Zaragoza, 1610
- Ferran De Sagarra, Sigillografia Catalana, inventari, descripciò i estudi dels segells de Catalunya, Barcelona, 1915
- Martì De Riquer, Heràldica catalana des de l'Any 1150 al 1550, Barcelona, 1983
- Salvatorangelo Palmerio Spanu, Origine dell'Arme di Sardegna, ESHA
- Barbara Fois, Lo stemma dei quattro mori: breve storia dell'emblema dei sardi, Sassari, Carlo Delfino Editore, 1990
- Franciscu Sedda, La vera storia della bandiera dei sardi, Cagliari, Edizioni Condaghes, 2007
- Mauro Podda, Quattro mori a Bruxelles, L'Unione Sarda, 12 aprile 2008, Cagliari
