= Flag and coat of arms of Corsica =

Corsica
- Use: Small vexillological symbol or pictogram in black and white showing the different uses of the flag
- Adopted: 1980 (re-adopted)
- Design: A white field with a black Moor's head

The flag of Corsica (Corsican: bandera di a Corsica) or the Corsican flag (bandera corsa), was adopted by General of the Nation Pasquale Paoli in 1755 and was based on a traditional flag used previously. It portrays a Moor's head in black wearing a white bandana above his eyes on a white background. Previously, the bandana covered his eyes; Paoli wanted the bandana moved to above the eyes to symbolize the liberation of the Corsican people from the Genoese.

It was used by the Corsican Republic and fell out of usage after 1769, when France forced the island's former Genoese masters to sell it to settle the debts contracted by the Italian maritime republic with France. This was to pay the costs of the French expeditionary corps, which should have helped Genoa to secure its control of Corsica; French troops put down the long-standing rebellion on the island. During this period under French rule, 1769–1789, Corsican patriots again used the version of the flag with blindfolded eyes, as a mark of protest.

The unblindfolded version, quartered with the British coat of arms, was used as the official flag during the Anglo-Corsican Kingdom of 1794–1796. It then fell into disuse until 1980, when it was officially re-adopted as the regional flag.

The Moor's head is also used on the coat of arms of Corsica, the flag of the neighbouring Sardinia, the coat of arms of Aragon, and on the crest of Clan Borthwick.

== Origin ==
According to the legend, it originates from the 13th century when a young Corsican woman named Diana was captured by Moorish slavers who planned to sell her to the slave market of Granada. Her fiancé Pablo managed to free her and a battle ensued between Corsicans and Moors, during which the Moorish leader Mansour Ben Ismaïl was beheaded. His severed head then became the symbol of Corsica in remembrance of the event.

In a coat of arms book of the late 14th century compiled in the Germanic area, the Armorial book of Gelre, the unblindfolded Moor's head is reported for Corsica in the states of the Crown of Aragon.

== Gallery ==
=== Flag ===
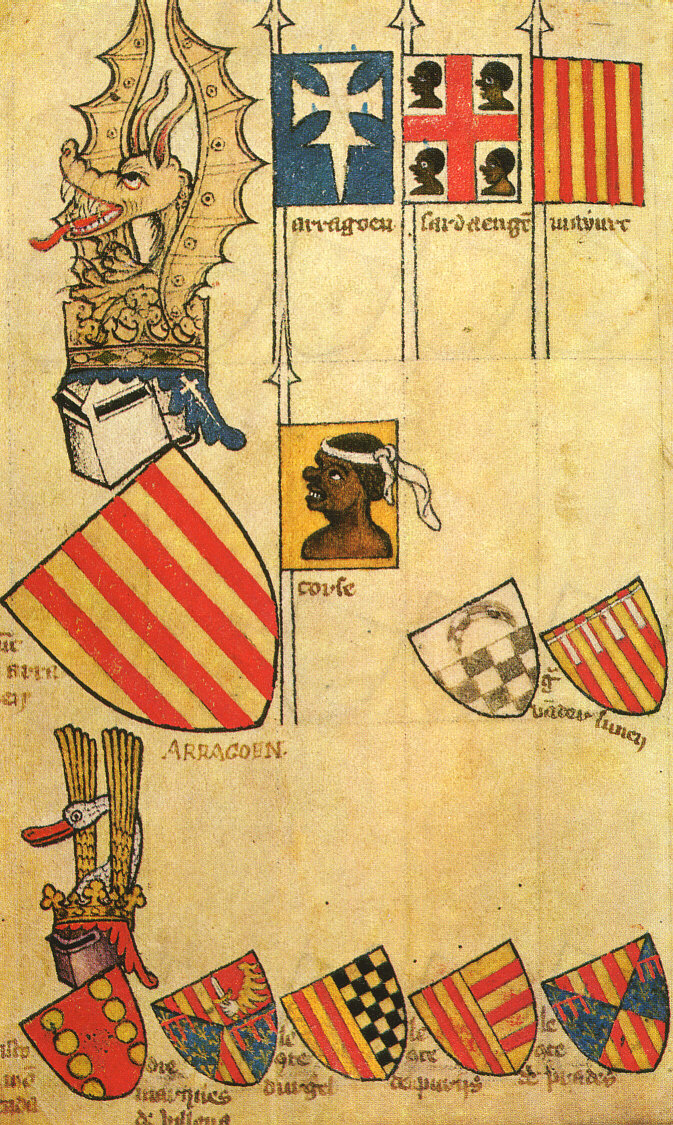
Gelre Armorial, Folio 62r, 14th century

Flag of Corsica before 1755

Flag of Corsica

=== Coat of arms ===
Coat of arms of the Kingdom of Corsica (1736)

Coat of arms of the Anglo-Corsican Kingdom (1794–1796)

Coat of arms of Corsica

== See also ==
- List of Corsican flags
- Flag of Sardinia
- Maure
