= Coat of arms of Aragon =

- Armiger: Aragon
- Adopted: 1499 (earliest)
- Crest: Aragonese Open Royal Crown
- Shield: Quarterly: 1 Sobrarbe, 2 Cross of Íñigo Arista (Primitive Aragon) 3 Cross of Alcoraz, and 4 Royal Bars of Aragon

The coat of arms of the modern autonomous community of Aragon, in Spain, is the one that became official by a law passed on 10th August, 1982. Its pattern is based on a traditional symbol that was first printed in 1499 by Pablo Hurus. It is made up of four parts:

- First quarter: The Sobrarbe tree or the Ainsa shield represents the legendary Kingdom of Sobrarbe and the establishment of Aragonese liberty.
- Second quarter: The Cross of Íñigo Arista represents the Pyrenees and the old Aragonese monarchy.
- Third quarter: The St George's Cross or "Four Moors flag" consists of a red cross of St George against a white background with a 'Maure' or head of a Moor in each quarter - also known as the "Cross of Alcoraz" which became the war flag of the Reconquista following the "Battle of Alcoraz" in 1096, when, according to tradition, the Kingdom of Aragon regained territory from the Moors under the auspices of Saint George. This quarter also inspired the coat of arms and flag of Sardinia and Corsica, former territories of the Crown of Aragon in the 14th and 15th centuries.
- Fourth quarter: The Bars of Aragon represents the familiar coat of arms of the Kings of Aragon that took over all territories within the Crown of Aragon.

== See also ==
- Flag of Aragon
- Coat of arms of the Crown of Aragon
