= Gold(I) fluoride =

Identifiers
3D model (JSmol)	Interactive image
ChemSpider	10605696
PubChem CID	21225580
CompTox Dashboard (EPA)	DTXSID401030369
- InChI: InChI=1S/Au.FH/h;1H/q+1;/p-1 Key: SDQPNEPNURFLTA-UHFFFAOYSA-M
- SMILES: [Au]F

Properties
Chemical formula	AuF
Molar mass	215.964973 g·mol^{−1}
- Except where otherwise noted, data are given for materials in their standard state (at 25 °C [77 °F], 100 kPa). Infobox references

Gold(I) fluoride is the inorganic compound with the formula AuF. The solid has eluded isolation, but its existence has been observed by rotational spectroscopy and mass spectrometry as a gas.

When stabilized by an NHC ligand, a gold fluoride complex has been characterized.
