= African Unification Front =

Organisation that wants Africa to become a federation

The African Unification Front (AUF) is an organisation aiming to promote the political, social and economic union of Africa.

== History ==
AUF was formed in August 1996. The AUF advocates for transformation of Africa into a federation, with the Pan African Parliament as the highest government, overseeing key institutions including a single currency, and one all-African army. The AUF promoted the creation of the African Union in the mid-1990s and continues to advocate for an end to neocolonialism. It has also been active in campaigns against abuses by the diamond industry, weapons traders, and unfair terms of trade in the coffee industry.

== Organization ==
The AUF National Committee is the body that elects the AUF president. The AUF Executive Committee is the body that implements policies and oversees the day-to-day administration of the AUF. AUF has been responsible for initiating and organizing several strategies, including the AUF's Fairtrade Coffee Campaign that pushed for reforms in the coffee industry.

The AUF, also known as the African Front, consists of a worldwide network of supporters, who believe that Africa must be unified into a federation as a means of securing peace and an end to wars and poverty. Although most members of the AUF are Africans, membership is open to non-Africans.

=== Past leaders ===
Other past AUF leaders have been Fesseha Demessae who served as Deputy Secretary General and Director of Cultural Affairs, and former vice-president Mongezi Sefika wa Nkomo.

Kirimi Kaberia was the first president of the AUF. Mouhamed Taofic Youssouf served briefly as AUF president, after Kirimi Kaberia accepted a posting as deputy ambassador for Kenya in Washington DC, USA.

== In the PAP ==
Following the creation of the Pan African Parliament, the AUF became the first All-African (continental) political party. Several PAP members are also members and supporters of the AUF.

AUF members who have served in the Pan African Parliament include Dr. Amani Walid Kabourou from Tanzania, Chrispin Mwitila Shumina from Zambia, and Loyce Bwambale from Uganda. Other influential supporters of the AUF include John Atta-Mills the president of Ghana, Alhaji Yahaya Ndu who is also a member of the AUF National Committee and the president of the African Renaissance Party in Nigeria, Alimamy Bakarr Sankoh, head of the Sierra Leone People's Democratic League (PDL), and Dr. Miria Matembe, formerly chair of the Pan African Parliament's Rules Committee and a close ally of AU President Gertrude Mongella.

== Symbols ==
The Maure is used as the AUF's flag and emblem. The head is blindfolded representing the impartiality of justice, and the knot is tied into a stylized Adinkra symbol for omnipotence (Gye Nyame).

== See also ==
- Maure
- African Union
