= Battle of Alcoraz =

1096 battle near the Pyrenees for the Reconquista

Coordinates: 42°08′29″N 0°22′57″W

- Part of Battles of the Reconquista
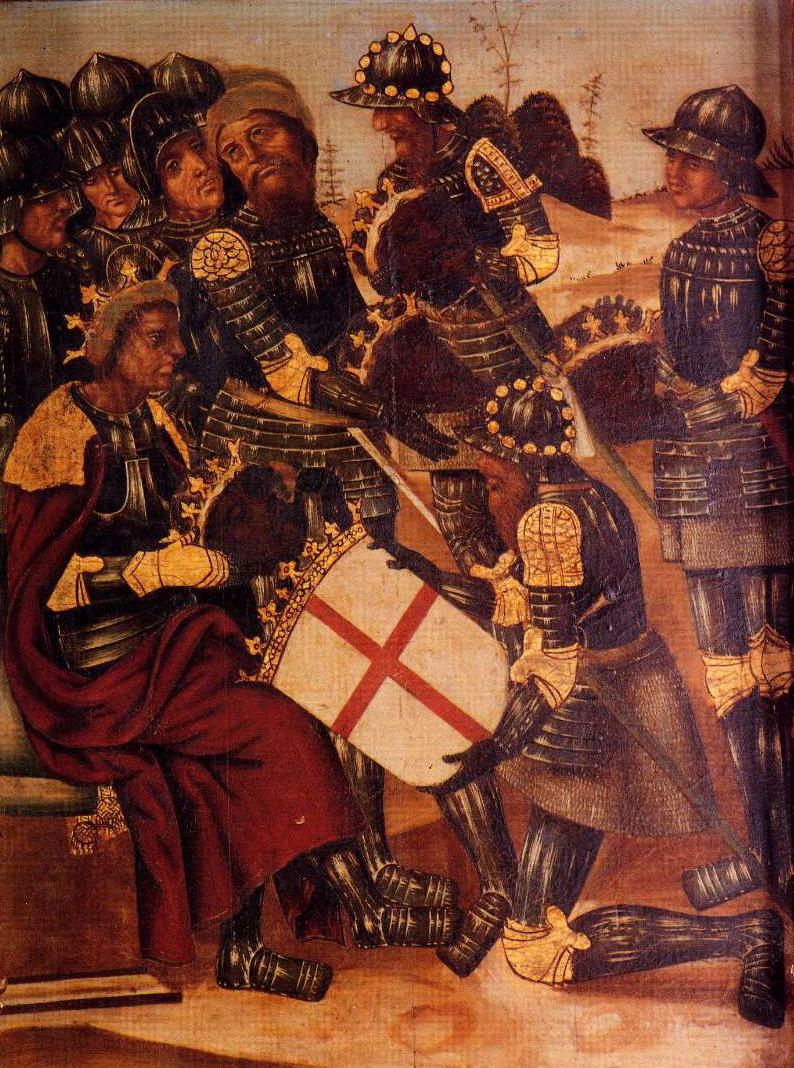
- Peter receiving a shield emblazoned with St George's Cross.
Date	15 November 1096
Location	Outside Huesca
Result	Aragonese victory
Territorial changes	Christian conquest of Huesca

Belligerents
Kingdom of Aragon; Kingdom of Pamplona	Taifa of Zaragoza; Kingdom of Castile

Commanders and leaders
Peter I Alfonso the Battler	Al-Mustain II; Gonzalo Núñez de Lara; García Ordóñez

The Battle of Alcoraz took place on 15 November 1096 on the fields of Alcoraz between the city walls of Huesca and the Castle of Montearagón. The battle pitted the forces of Peter I of Aragon and Pamplona against the allied forces of Al-Musta'in II of the Taifa of Zaragoza and García Ordóñez de Nájera and Gonzalo Núñez de Lara representing Alfonso VI of León and Castille.

In 1094, Sancho Ramírez, the King of Aragon and Pamplona initiated a siege of the strategic Muslim city of Huesca. The siege was managed by Sancho from his encampments established at Montearagón Castle and Pueyo de Sancho, a fortress built temporarily on San Jorge hill, located 3 km west of Huesca. In June 1094, however, Sancho was struck and killed by an arrow while inspecting the ramparts surrounding Huesca. Sancho's son and heir, Peter I took command and continued the siege.

The siege continued for nearly two and a half years until in November 1096 when a Muslim relief army commanded Al-Musta'in II, the ruler of the Taifa of Zaragoza approached Huesca intent upon breaking the Aragonese siege and relieving the city of Huesca. In the relief effort, the Muslim troops were supported by Castilian forces under the command of Counts García Ordóñez and Gonzalo Núñez de Lara.

On 15 November 1096, the allied troops of Al-Musta'in II approached Huesca on the fields of Alcoraz, just outside of Huesca. At this point, the army of Peter I clashed with and defeated the Muslim relief force. Less than two weeks later, Huesca surrendered.

Later legends hold that during the battle, Saint George appeared above the crown of Aragon, to inspire the Christian army who were heavily outnumbered in this first Reconquista. This parallels the legendary story of the Battle of Clavijo, over two hundred years earlier, where Saint James was similarly alleged to have appeared before the Christian forces of the Kingdom of Asturias in the battle against the Saracen armies.

The heraldic war shield known as the Cross of Alcoraz which commemorated the battle was later adopted as the personal coat of arms of King Peter III of Aragon and subsequently incorporated into the flag of the Kingdom of Aragon where it remains to this day.
