= List of United Kingdom locations: Boa-Bot =

The United Kingdom

This is part of the list of United Kingdom locations: a gazetteer of place names in the United Kingdom showing each place's locality and geographical coordinates.

== Bo ==
=== Boa ===
Location	Locality	Coordinates (links to map & photo sources)	OS grid reference
Boarhills	Fife	56.31°N 02.71°W	NO5614
Boarhunt	Hampshire	50.86°N 01.14°W	SU6008
Boarsgreave	Lancashire	53.67°N 02.24°W	SD8420
Boarshead	East Sussex	51.06°N 00.18°E	TQ5332
Boar's Head	Wigan	53.56°N 02.65°W	SD5708
Boars Hill	Oxfordshire	51.71°N 01.30°W	SP4802
Boarstall	Buckinghamshire	51.82°N 01.10°W	SP6214
Boasley Cross	Devon	50.71°N 04.12°W	SX5093
Boat of Garten	Highland	57.24°N 03.75°W	NH9418

=== Bob ===
Location	Locality	Coordinates (links to map & photo sources)	OS grid reference
Bobbing	Kent	51.35°N 00.69°E	TQ8865
Bobbington	Staffordshire	52.50°N 02.29°W	SO8090
Bobbingworth	Essex	51.72°N 00.21°E	TL5305
Bobby Hill	Suffolk	52.32°N 00.93°E	TM0074

=== Boc ===
Location	Locality	Coordinates (links to map & photo sources)	OS grid reference
Bocaddon	Cornwall	50.39°N 04.57°W	SX1758
Bockhanger	Kent	51.16°N 00.87°E	TR0144
Bocking	Essex	51.87°N 00.54°E	TL7523
Bocking Churchstreet	Essex	51.89°N 00.55°E	TL7625
Bocking's Elm	Essex	51.80°N 01.11°E	TM1516
Bockleton	Worcestershire	52.24°N 02.60°W	SO5961
Bockmer End	Buckinghamshire	51.56°N 00.83°W	SU8186
Bocombe	Devon	50.96°N 04.30°W	SS3821

=== Bod ===
Location	Locality	Coordinates (links to map & photo sources)	OS grid reference
Boddam	Shetland Islands	59.91°N 01.30°W	HU3915
Boddam	Aberdeenshire	57.46°N 01.78°W	NK1342
Bodden	Somerset	51.19°N 02.53°W	ST6344
Boddin	Angus	56.66°N 02.47°W	NO7153
Boddington	Gloucestershire	51.92°N 02.16°W	SO8925
Bodedern	Isle of Anglesey	53.29°N 04.50°W	SH3380
Bodellick	Cornwall	50.52°N 04.89°W	SW9573
Bodelva	Cornwall	50.35°N 04.74°W	SX0554
Bodelwyddan	Denbighshire	53.26°N 03.50°W	SJ0075
Bodenham	Wiltshire	51.03°N 01.77°W	SU1626
Bodenham	Herefordshire	52.15°N 02.68°W	SO5351
Bodenham Bank	Herefordshire	51.98°N 02.52°W	SO6432
Bodenham Moor	Herefordshire	52.14°N 02.67°W	SO5450
Bodewryd	Isle of Anglesey	53.38°N 04.42°W	SH3990
Bodfari	Denbighshire	53.21°N 03.36°W	SJ0970
Bodffordd	Isle of Anglesey	53.25°N 04.37°W	SH4276
Bodham	Norfolk	52.91°N 01.15°E	TG1240
Bodiam	East Sussex	50.99°N 00.53°E	TQ7825
Bodicote	Oxfordshire	52.02°N 01.33°W	SP4637
Bodieve	Cornwall	50.52°N 04.83°W	SW9973
Bodiggo	Cornwall	50.38°N 04.75°W	SX0458
Bodilly	Cornwall	50.14°N 05.27°W	SW6632
Bodinnick	Cornwall	50.33°N 04.62°W	SX1352
Bodle Street Green	East Sussex	50.90°N 00.34°E	TQ6514
Bodley	Devon	51.18°N 03.91°W	SS6645
Bodmin	Cornwall	50.47°N 04.73°W	SX0667
Bodmiscombe	Devon	50.87°N 03.28°W	ST1009
Bodney	Norfolk	52.54°N 00.69°E	TL8398
Bodsham	Kent	51.16°N 01.00°E	TR1045
Boduan	Gwynedd	52.90°N 04.49°W	SH3237
Boduel	Cornwall	50.43°N 04.50°W	SX2263
Bodwen	Cornwall	50.40°N 04.77°W	SX0360
Bodymoor Heath	Warwickshire	52.56°N 01.70°W	SP2096

=== Bof ===
Location	Locality	Coordinates (links to map & photo sources)	OS grid reference
Bofarnel	Cornwall	50.43°N 04.67°W	SX1063

=== Bog ===
Location	Locality	Coordinates (links to map & photo sources)	OS grid reference
Bogach	Western Isles	56.99°N 07.41°W	NF7102
Bogallan	Highland	57.52°N 04.28°W	NH6350
Bogend	Nottinghamshire	53.00°N 01.27°W	SK4946
Bogend	South Ayrshire	55.55°N 04.55°W	NS3932
Boghall	Midlothian	55.87°N 03.21°W	NT2465
Boghall	West Lothian	55.89°N 03.61°W	NS9968
Bogmoor	Moray	57.64°N 03.09°W	NJ3562
Bogniebrae	Aberdeenshire	57.49°N 02.68°W	NJ5945
Bognor Regis	West Sussex	50.78°N 00.68°W	SZ9399
Bograxie	Aberdeenshire	57.26°N 02.49°W	NJ7019
Bogs Bank	Scottish Borders	55.73°N 03.35°W	NT1550
Bogside	North Lanarkshire	55.76°N 03.86°W	NS8354
Bogthorn	Bradford	53.84°N 01.94°W	SE0439
Bogton	Aberdeenshire	57.54°N 02.55°W	NJ6751

=== Boh ===
Location	Locality	Coordinates (links to map & photo sources)	OS grid reference
Bohemia	East Sussex	50.86°N 00.55°E	TQ8010
Bohemia	Wiltshire	50.97°N 01.71°W	SU2019
Bohenie	Highland	56.89°N 04.80°W	NN2982
Bohetherick	Cornwall	50.48°N 04.24°W	SX4167
Bohortha	Cornwall	50.14°N 04.99°W	SW8632
Bohuntine	Highland	56.90°N 04.82°W	NN2883
Bohuntinville	Highland	56.89°N 04.82°W	NN2882

=== Boj ===
Location	Locality	Coordinates (links to map & photo sources)	OS grid reference
Bojewyan	Cornwall	50.14°N 05.65°W	SW3934

=== Bok ===
Location	Locality	Coordinates (links to map & photo sources)	OS grid reference
Bokiddick	Cornwall	50.42°N 04.74°W	SX0562

=== Bol ===
Location	Locality	Coordinates (links to map & photo sources)	OS grid reference
Bolahaul	Carmarthenshire	51.83°N 04.29°W	SN4218
Bolam	Northumberland	55.13°N 01.86°W	NZ0982
Bolam	Durham	54.59°N 01.70°W	NZ1922
Bolam West Houses	Northumberland	55.13°N 01.90°W	NZ0682
Bolas Heath	Shropshire	52.78°N 02.49°W	SJ6721
Bolberry	Devon	50.23°N 03.83°W	SX6939
Bold Heath	St Helens	53.39°N 02.70°W	SJ5389
Boldmere	Birmingham	52.54°N 01.83°W	SP1194
Boldon Colliery	South Tyneside	54.94°N 01.47°W	NZ3461
Boldre	Hampshire	50.78°N 01.54°W	SZ3298
Boldron	Durham	54.52°N 01.95°W	NZ0314
Bole	Nottinghamshire	53.37°N 00.81°W	SK7987
Bolehall	Staffordshire	52.62°N 01.69°W	SK2103
Bolehill	Derbyshire	53.09°N 01.56°W	SK2955
Bolehill	Sheffield	53.33°N 01.47°W	SK3582
Bolenowe	Cornwall	50.18°N 05.26°W	SW6737
Boleside	Scottish Borders	55.58°N 02.81°W	NT4933
Boley Park	Staffordshire	52.67°N 01.80°W	SK1309
Bolham	Devon	50.91°N 03.49°W	SS9514
Bolham	Nottinghamshire	53.33°N 00.95°W	SK7082
Bolham Water	Devon	50.90°N 03.19°W	ST1612
Bolholt	Bury	53.59°N 02.33°W	SD7811
Bolingey	Cornwall	50.33°N 05.14°W	SW7653
Bolitho	Cornwall	50.15°N 05.27°W	SW6634
Bollihope	Durham	54.70°N 02.00°W	NZ0034
Bollington	Cheshire	53.29°N 02.10°W	SJ9377
Bollington Cross	Cheshire	53.29°N 02.12°W	SJ9277
Bolney	West Sussex	50.99°N 00.20°W	TQ2623
Bolnhurst	Bedfordshire	52.21°N 00.42°W	TL0859
Bolnore	West Sussex	50.99°N 00.12°W	TQ3223
Bolsover	Derbyshire	53.22°N 01.29°W	SK4770
Bolsterstone	Sheffield	53.46°N 01.59°W	SK2796
Bolstone	Herefordshire	51.98°N 02.65°W	SO5532
Boltby	North Yorkshire	54.26°N 01.24°W	SE4986
Bolter End	Buckinghamshire	51.62°N 00.86°W	SU7992
Bolton	Bolton	53.56°N 02.43°W	SD7108
Bolton	Bradford	53.81°N 01.75°W	SE1635
Bolton	Cumbria	54.60°N 02.57°W	NY6323
Bolton	East Lothian	55.92°N 02.80°W	NT5070
Bolton	East Riding of Yorkshire	53.95°N 00.82°W	SE7752
Bolton	Northumberland	55.41°N 01.84°W	NU1013
Bolton Abbey	North Yorkshire	53.97°N 01.89°W	SE0753
Bolton Bridge	North Yorkshire	53.97°N 01.91°W	SE0653
Bolton-by-Bowland	Lancashire	53.93°N 02.33°W	SD7849
Boltonfellend	Cumbria	55.00°N 02.83°W	NY4768
Boltongate	Cumbria	54.74°N 03.21°W	NY2240
Bolton Green	Lancashire	53.64°N 02.68°W	SD5517
Bolton Houses	Lancashire	53.79°N 02.85°W	SD4433
Bolton-le-Sands	Lancashire	54.10°N 02.79°W	SD4868
Bolton Low Houses	Cumbria	54.78°N 03.19°W	NY2344
Bolton New Houses	Cumbria	54.78°N 03.18°W	NY2444
Bolton-on-Swale	North Yorkshire	54.38°N 01.61°W	SE2599
Bolton Percy	North Yorkshire	53.86°N 01.19°W	SE5341
Bolton Town End	Lancashire	54.09°N 02.79°W	SD4867
Bolton upon Dearne	Rotherham	53.51°N 01.32°W	SE4502
Bolton Wood Lane	Cumbria	54.78°N 03.16°W	NY2544
Bolton Woods	Bradford	53.81°N 01.77°W	SE1535
Boltshope Park	Durham	54.81°N 02.09°W	NY9447
Bolventor	Cornwall	50.55°N 04.57°W	SX1876

=== Bom ===
Location	Locality	Coordinates (links to map & photo sources)	OS grid reference
Bomarsund	Northumberland	55.15°N 01.57°W	NZ2784
Bomby	Cumbria	54.54°N 02.74°W	NY5217
Bomere Heath	Shropshire	52.76°N 02.78°W	SJ4719

=== Bon ===
Location	Locality	Coordinates (links to map & photo sources)	OS grid reference
Bonaly	City of Edinburgh	55.89°N 03.26°W	NT2168
Bonar Bridge	Highland	57.88°N 04.34°W	NH6191
Bonawe	Argyll and Bute	56.44°N 05.24°W	NN0033
Bonby	North Lincolnshire	53.62°N 00.48°W	TA0015
Boncath	Pembrokeshire	52.01°N 04.62°W	SN2038
Bonchester Bridge	Scottish Borders	55.39°N 02.66°W	NT5811
Bonchurch	Isle of Wight	50.59°N 01.19°W	SZ5777
Bondend	Gloucestershire	51.83°N 02.20°W	SO8615
Bond End	Staffordshire	52.75°N 01.79°W	SK1418
Bondleigh	Devon	50.81°N 03.91°W	SS6504
Bondman Hays	Leicestershire	52.65°N 01.27°W	SK4907
Bonds	Lancashire	53.89°N 02.77°W	SD4944
Bonehill	Devon	50.57°N 03.80°W	SX7277
Bonehill	Staffordshire	52.61°N 01.72°W	SK1902
Bo'ness	Falkirk	56.01°N 03.62°W	NS9981
Bonhill	West Dunbartonshire	55.97°N 04.56°W	NS4079
Bonkle	North Lanarkshire	55.78°N 03.86°W	NS8356
Bonnavoulin	Highland	56.60°N 05.97°W	NM5653
Bonning Gate	Cumbria	54.34°N 02.80°W	SD4895
Bonnington	Kent	51.07°N 00.92°E	TR0535
Bonnington (near Peebles)	Scottish Borders	55.63°N 03.19°W	NT2538
Bonnington	City of Edinburgh	55.90°N 03.42°W	NT1169
Bonnington Smiddy	Angus	56.54°N 02.70°W	NO5739
Bonnybank	Fife	56.21°N 03.04°W	NO3503
Bonnybridge	Falkirk	55.99°N 03.89°W	NS8280
Bonnykelly	Aberdeenshire	57.56°N 02.25°W	NJ8553
Bonnyrigg	Midlothian	55.87°N 03.12°W	NT3065
Bonnyton	East Ayrshire	55.61°N 04.52°W	NS4138
Bonnyton	Aberdeenshire	57.36°N 02.55°W	NJ6730
Bonnyton (Auchterhouse)	Angus	56.52°N 03.09°W	NO3338
Bonnyton (Montrose)	Angus	56.68°N 02.55°W	NO6655
Bonsall	Derbyshire	53.11°N 01.59°W	SK2758
Bonson	Somerset	51.15°N 03.11°W	ST2240
Bontddu	Gwynedd	52.74°N 03.98°W	SH6618
Bont Dolgadfan	Powys	52.58°N 03.65°W	SH8800
Bont Fawr	Carmarthenshire	51.90°N 03.87°W	SN7125
Bont-goch / Elerch	Ceredigion	52.45°N 03.94°W	SN6886
Bonthorpe	Lincolnshire	53.22°N 00.21°E	TF4872
Bont-newydd	Conwy	53.21°N 03.48°W	SJ0170
Bontnewydd	Ceredigion	52.272°N 04.028°W	SN6165
Bontnewydd	Gwynedd	53.10°N 04.27°W	SH4859
Bontuchel	Denbighshire	53.10°N 03.37°W	SJ0857
Bonvilston	The Vale Of Glamorgan	51.45°N 03.35°W	ST0674
Bon-y-maen	Swansea	51.63°N 03.90°W	SS6895

=== Boo ===
Location	Locality	Coordinates (links to map & photo sources)	OS grid reference
Boode	Devon	51.12°N 04.14°W	SS5038
Booker	Buckinghamshire	51.61°N 00.80°W	SU8391
Bookham	Dorset	50.83°N 02.42°W	ST7004
Booleybank	Shropshire	52.82°N 02.63°W	SJ5725
Boon	Scottish Borders	55.69°N 02.68°W	NT5745
Boon Hill	Staffordshire	53.04°N 02.29°W	SJ8050
Boorley Green	Hampshire	50.92°N 01.28°W	SU5014
Boosbeck	Redcar and Cleveland	54.54°N 00.98°W	NZ6617
Boose's Green	Essex	51.93°N 00.67°E	TL8430
Boot	Cumbria	54.39°N 03.28°W	NY1701
Booth	Calderdale	53.73°N 01.94°W	SE0427
Booth	Staffordshire	52.84°N 01.94°W	SK0427
Booth Bank	Cheshire	53.36°N 02.42°W	SJ7285
Booth Bridge	Lancashire	53.91°N 02.13°W	SD9147
Boothby Graffoe	Lincolnshire	53.11°N 00.53°W	SK9859
Boothby Pagnell	Lincolnshire	52.85°N 00.56°W	SK9730
Boothen	City of Stoke-on-Trent	52.99°N 02.19°W	SJ8744
Boothferry	East Riding of Yorkshire	53.72°N 00.89°W	SE7326
Boothgate	Derbyshire	53.03°N 01.44°W	SK3749
Booth Green	Cheshire	53.32°N 02.12°W	SJ9281
Booth of Toft	Shetland Islands	60.46°N 01.21°W	HU4376
Boothroyd	Kirklees	53.68°N 01.65°W	SE2321
Boothsdale	Cheshire	53.19°N 02.70°W	SJ5367
Boothstown	Salford	53.49°N 02.42°W	SD7200
Boothtown	Calderdale	53.73°N 01.88°W	SE0826
Boothville	Northamptonshire	52.26°N 00.85°W	SP7864
Booth Wood	Calderdale	53.64°N 01.95°W	SE0316
Bootle	Cumbria	54.28°N 03.38°W	SD1088
Bootle	Sefton	53.43°N 03.01°W	SJ3394
Booton	Norfolk	52.75°N 01.12°E	TG1122
Boots Green	Cheshire	53.24°N 02.37°W	SJ7572
Boot Street	Suffolk	52.08°N 01.23°E	TM2248
Booze	North Yorkshire	54.41°N 01.98°W	NZ0102

=== Bop ===
Location	Locality	Coordinates (links to map & photo sources)	OS grid reference
Bopeep	Bromley	51.352°N 00.140°E	TQ491636

=== Boq ===
Location	Locality	Coordinates (links to map & photo sources)	OS grid reference
Boquhan	Stirling	56.05°N 04.36°W	NS5387
Boquhapple	Stirling	56.17°N 04.17°W	NN6500
Boquio	Cornwall	50.15°N 05.26°W	SW6733

=== Bor ===
Location	Locality	Coordinates (links to map & photo sources)	OS grid reference
Boraston	Shropshire	52.31°N 02.57°W	SO6169
Boraston Dale	Shropshire	52.32°N 02.57°W	SO6170
Borden	Kent	51.32°N 00.69°E	TQ8862
Borden	West Sussex	51.00°N 00.83°W	SU8224
Border	Cumbria	54.87°N 03.31°W	NY1654
Bordesley	Birmingham	52.47°N 01.88°W	SP0886
Bordesley Green	Birmingham	52.47°N 01.85°W	SP1086
Bordlands	Scottish Borders	55.70°N 03.35°W	NT1546
Bordley	North Yorkshire	54.07°N 02.09°W	SD9464
Bordon	Hampshire	51.10°N 00.87°W	SU7935
Boreham	Essex	51.75°N 00.53°E	TL7509
Boreham	Wiltshire	51.19°N 02.17°W	ST8844
Boreham Street	East Sussex	50.87°N 00.35°E	TQ6611
Borehamwood	Hertfordshire	51.65°N 00.28°W	TQ1997
Boreland	Dumfries and Galloway	55.20°N 03.30°W	NY1791
Boreland	Fife	56.14°N 03.12°W	NT3094
Boreley	Worcestershire	52.28°N 02.26°W	SO8265
Boreray (North Uist)	Western Isles	57.71°N 07.29°W	NF849812
Boreray (St Kilda)	Western Isles	57.87°N 08.49°W	NA154052
Borestone	Stirling	56.08°N 03.94°W	NS7990
Borgh (Lewis)	Western Isles	58.41°N 06.43°W	NB4156
Borghastan	Western Isles	58.27°N 06.79°W	NB1942
Borgie	Highland	58.49°N 04.28°W	NC6759
Borgue	Dumfries and Galloway	54.80°N 04.13°W	NX6348
Borgue	Highland	58.20°N 03.48°W	ND1325
Borley	Essex	52.04°N 00.68°E	TL8442
Borley Green	Essex	52.04°N 00.66°E	TL8342
Borley Green	Suffolk	52.20°N 00.91°E	TL9960
Bornais	Western Isles	57.23°N 07.42°W	NF7329
Bornesketaig	Highland	57.65°N 06.41°W	NG3771
Borness	Dumfries and Galloway	54.78°N 04.16°W	NX6145
Borough	Isles of Scilly	49.94°N 06.33°W	SV8914
Boroughbridge	North Yorkshire	54.08°N 01.40°W	SE3966
Borough Green	Kent	51.28°N 00.29°E	TQ6057
Borough Marsh	Berkshire	51.48°N 00.89°W	SU7777
Borough Park	Staffordshire	52.64°N 01.69°W	SK2105
Borough Post	Somerset	51.01°N 02.98°W	ST3124
Borough The	Dorset	50.89°N 02.42°W	ST7011
Borras	Wrexham	53.06°N 02.98°W	SJ3452
Borreraig	Highland	57.47°N 06.70°W	NG1853
Borrodale	Highland	57.43°N 06.73°W	NG1648
Borrowash	Derbyshire	52.90°N 01.37°W	SK4234
Borrowby (Scarborough)	North Yorkshire	54.52°N 00.81°W	NZ7715
Borrowby (Hambleton)	North Yorkshire	54.29°N 01.35°W	SE4289
Borrowston	Highland	58.37°N 03.16°W	ND3243
Borrowstoun Mains	Falkirk	56.00°N 03.62°W	NS9980
Borsham	Western Isles	57.76°N 06.91°W	NG0885
Borstal	Kent	51.36°N 00.48°E	TQ7366
Borth	Ceredigion	52.48°N 04.06°W	SN6089
Borthwick	Midlothian	55.82°N 03.02°W	NT3659
Borth-y-Gest	Gwynedd	52.91°N 04.14°W	SH5637
Borve (Skye)	Highland	57.45°N 06.26°W	NG4448
Borve (North Uist)	Western Isles	57.71°N 07.19°W	NF9181
Borve (Harris)	Western Isles	57.83°N 07.00°W	NG0394
Borve (Barra)	Western Isles	56.97°N 07.50°W	NF6601
Borwick	Lancashire	54.15°N 02.73°W	SD5273
Borwick Rails	Cumbria	54.20°N 03.25°W	SD1879

=== Bos ===
Location	Locality	Coordinates (links to map & photo sources)	OS grid reference
Bosbury	Herefordshire	52.08°N 02.45°W	SO6943
Boscadjack	Cornwall	50.13°N 05.27°W	SW6631
Boscastle	Cornwall	50.67°N 04.70°W	SX0990
Boscean	Cornwall	50.12°N 05.69°W	SW3632
Boscombe	Bournemouth	50.71°N 01.84°W	SZ1191
Boscombe	Wiltshire	51.14°N 01.71°W	SU2038
Boscomoor	Staffordshire	52.71°N 02.11°W	SJ9213
Boscoppa	Cornwall	50.34°N 04.77°W	SX0353
Boscreege	Cornwall	50.12°N 05.37°W	SW5930
Bosham	West Sussex	50.83°N 00.86°W	SU8004
Bosham Hoe	West Sussex	50.80°N 00.85°W	SU8101
Bosherston	Pembrokeshire	51.60°N 04.94°W	SR9694
Boskednan	Cornwall	50.15°N 05.58°W	SW4434
Boskenna	Cornwall	50.05°N 05.60°W	SW4223
Bosleake	Cornwall	50.21°N 05.26°W	SW6740
Bosley	Cheshire	53.18°N 02.13°W	SJ9165
Boslowick	Cornwall	50.13°N 05.09°W	SW7931
Boslymon	Cornwall	50.41°N 04.70°W	SX0861
Bosoughan	Cornwall	50.40°N 04.99°W	SW8760
Bosporthennis	Cornwall	50.16°N 05.60°W	SW4336
Bossall	North Yorkshire	54.03°N 00.91°W	SE7160
Bossiney	Cornwall	50.65°N 04.74°W	SX0688
Bossingham	Kent	51.19°N 01.07°E	TR1548
Bossington	Somerset	51.21°N 03.59°W	SS8947
Bossington	Hampshire	51.07°N 01.53°W	SU3331
Bossington	Kent	51.25°N 01.19°E	TR2355
Bostock Green	Cheshire	53.21°N 02.49°W	SJ6769
Boston	Lincolnshire	52.97°N 00.02°W	TF3344
Boston Long Hedges	Lincolnshire	53.00°N 00.01°E	TF3547
Boston Spa	Leeds	53.89°N 01.36°W	SE4245
Boston West	Lincolnshire	52.98°N 00.07°W	TF2945
Boswednack	Cornwall	50.17°N 05.58°W	SW4437
Boswin	Cornwall	50.16°N 05.23°W	SW6934
Boswinger	Cornwall	50.23°N 04.82°W	SW9941
Boswyn	Cornwall	50.17°N 05.27°W	SW6636

=== Bot ===
Location	Locality	Coordinates (links to map & photo sources)	OS grid reference
Botallack	Cornwall	50.12°N 05.69°W	SW3632
Botany Bay	Enfield	51.67°N 00.13°W	TQ2999
Botany Bay	Monmouthshire	51.71°N 02.71°W	SO5102
Botcherby	Cumbria	54.88°N 02.92°W	NY4155
Botcheston	Leicestershire	52.63°N 01.29°W	SK4804
Botesdale	Suffolk	52.33°N 00.99°E	TM0475
Bothal	Northumberland	55.16°N 01.64°W	NZ2386
Bothampstead	Berkshire	51.48°N 01.28°W	SU5076
Bothamsall	Nottinghamshire	53.25°N 00.99°W	SK6773
Bothel	Cumbria	54.73°N 03.27°W	NY1838
Bothen	Shetland Islands	60.78°N 00.84°W	HP6312
Bothenhampton	Dorset	50.71°N 02.76°W	SY4691
Bothwell	South Lanarkshire	55.79°N 04.07°W	NS7058
Botley	Hampshire	50.91°N 01.27°W	SU5113
Botley	Oxfordshire	51.74°N 01.30°W	SP4805
Botley	Buckinghamshire	51.70°N 00.58°W	SP9802
Botloe's Green	Gloucestershire	51.95°N 02.40°W	SO7228
Botolph Claydon	Buckinghamshire	51.91°N 00.94°W	SP7324
Botolphs	West Sussex	50.86°N 00.31°W	TQ1909
Bottacks	Highland	57.60°N 04.54°W	NH4860
Botternell	Cornwall	50.54°N 04.44°W	SX2774
Bottesford	Leicestershire	52.93°N 00.81°W	SK8038
Bottesford	North Lincolnshire	53.55°N 00.65°W	SE8907
Bottisham	Cambridgeshire	52.21°N 00.25°E	TL5460
Bottlesford	Wiltshire	51.33°N 01.84°W	SU1159
Bottom Boat	Wakefield	53.71°N 01.47°W	SE3524
Bottomcraig	Fife	56.40°N 03.03°W	NO3624
Bottom House	Staffordshire	53.06°N 01.94°W	SK0452
Bottomley	Calderdale	53.66°N 01.91°W	SE0619
Bottom of Hutton	Lancashire	53.73°N 02.78°W	SD4827
Bottom o' th' Moor	Bolton	53.58°N 02.51°W	SD6610
Bottom Pond	Kent	51.28°N 00.70°E	TQ8958
Botton	North Yorkshire	54.43°N 00.93°W	NZ6904
Bottoms	Cornwall	50.05°N 05.66°W	SW3824
Bottreaux Mill	Devon	51.02°N 03.68°W	SS8226
Bottrells Close	Buckinghamshire	51.62°N 00.58°W	SU9893
Botts Green	Warwickshire	52.52°N 01.64°W	SP2492
Botusfleming	Cornwall	50.42°N 04.25°W	SX4061
Botwnnog	Gwynedd	52.84°N 04.58°W	SH2631
