= John Maclellan, 3rd Lord Kirkcudbright =

Scottish nobleman and royalist

John MacLellan, born c. 1620 in Borgue, Kirkcudbrightshire, Dumfries & Galloway, Scotland, was the 3rd Lord Kirkcudbright, a title he held from 1648, when his cousin Thomas McClellan 2nd Lord Kirkcudbright died, until 1665. John was the son of John MacLellan of Borgue born c. 1585 and Margaret Coupar.

== Biography ==
In 1642, John married Ann Maxwell, daughter of Sir Robert Maxwell of Orchardton. Ann was the granddaughter of the 1st Lord Kirkcudbright, and their union consolidated the family's noble position. They had only one surviving son, William McClellan, who succeeded John as the 4th Lord Kirkcudbright after his death.

John McClellan was deeply involved in the religious and political struggles of his time, which centered around the conflict between the Presbyterian Covenanters and the Royalists during the Wars of the Three Kingdoms. A zealous Presbyterian, he was also a fervent opponent of the English Parliament, particularly Cromwell and his supporters. This passionate commitment to the Presbyterian cause led to significant personal and financial hardships. McClellan had to mortgage much of his estate in the name of supporting the war effort.

In June 1648, John McClellan was formally recognized as Lord Kirkcudbright, heir to the McClellan lands and title through a legal process called a "retour of special service." This process confirmed him as the rightful successor to the late Thomas McClellan 2nd Lord Kirkcudbright, in the lands and barony of Bombie, Kirkcudbright.

McClellan’s military career began in the aftermath of the defeat of the Scottish forces at the Battle of Dunbar. In February 1649, he was appointed Colonel of Foot for the counties of Galloway, Ayrshire, and Renfrewshire, and was tasked with raising a regiment of soldiers to fight in the ongoing conflict. Initially, the regiment was to have 800 men, but McClellan struggled to recruit sufficient forces, and only a fraction of the expected soldiers was raised. Despite these setbacks, McClellan's forces fought in the Irish campaigns of 1649, where they faced severe defeats, including a disastrous engagement at Lissnagerry, Ulster, which nearly wiped out his regiment.

In 1650, McClellan’s military efforts were again called into action as part of the larger Scottish resistance against the English Commonwealth. He was involved in raising further troops for the disastrous Dunbar campaign and, after the defeat at the Battle of Dunbar, his surviving troops were reorganized into dragoons and sent to fight in the Western Association Army. However, after the Battle of Hamilton in December 1650, McClellan’s forces were defeated, and the remnants of his regiment were eventually surrendered to the English.

Beyond his military involvement, John McClellan was entangled in the religious and political controversies of the time. As a Presbyterian, he strongly opposed the rise of Episcopalianism, particularly the introduction of John Jaffrey as the Episcopalian minister at the Kirkcudbright church in 1663. This opposition led to violent riots, during which McClellan and others were arrested and imprisoned in Edinburgh. McClellan was fined for his role in the disturbances.

He also played an active role in the politics of the Covenanters. In 1648, he participated in the Committee of Estates, the governing body of Scotland during the period of the Wars of the Three Kingdoms. In 1649, he corresponded with John McClellan, a minister in Kirkcudbright, discussing the contentious issue of church patronage, which was a subject of considerable debate at the time. The correspondence indicated McClellan's commitment to a Presbyterian form of church governance and his disdain for the increasing influence of royalist and Episcopalian factions.

Despite his dedication to the Presbyterian cause and the sacrifices he made during the civil wars, McClellan’s financial situation was precarious. He had incurred heavy debts and was forced to mortgage his lands several times. In 1653, the estate of Bombie, which was part of his holdings, was seized due to unpaid loans. Similar actions were taken regarding his other estates at Skellarie Plantation and Kirkcudbright.

McClellan was also involved in a dispute over his right to precedence in the Scottish Parliament, protesting against the seating of Lord Forrester and Lord Pitsligo in a session of Parliament in January 1661. He claimed that his patent granted him seniority over these lords. In 1677, McClellan was noted as having served as the Commissioner for Excise in Kirkcudbrightshire, despite the decline of his fortune.

John McClellan 3rd Lord Kirkcudbright, died in 1665. Following his death, his widow Ann Maxwell received a liferent (a right to the use of the deceased's property for life), and the remainder of his estate was eventually passed on to his son, William McClellan, who succeeded him as the 4th Lord Kirkcudbright.

=== William McClellan ===
John's son, William MacLellan, born c. 1647 in Borgue, Kirkcudbrightshire, Dumfries & Galloway, Scotland, was the 4th Lord Kirkcudbright, a title he held from 1665 until his death on 29 March 1668. Throughout his lifetime, his father's entire estate was taken by creditors. Since William was a minor and unmarried at the time of his death, the succession was then opened to the descendants of William McClellan of Auchlane.

=== John McClellan of Auchlane ===
In 1668, John McClellan of Auchlane made a supplication as heir William, as nephew of the 3rd Lord Kirkcudbright, but immediately renounced his right as heir because he was pursued by his father William MacLellan of Auchlane's creditors and lacked sufficient funds to pay off his debts. Nevertheless, he is occasionally referred to as a Lord Kirkcudbright, despite the fact that he never possessed the title.

== Bibliography ==
- Nicholson, J. (1855). Minute Book Kept by the War Committee of the Covenanters in the Stewartry of Kirkcudbright in the Years 1640 & 1641. Nicholson Printing Company. 198-199.
- MacClellan, John. Record of the House of Kirkcudbright. Written in 1874 and revised and enlarged in 1903. Dumfries: J. Maxwell & Son, 1906. 34-36.
- Douglas, D. (1904). The Scots Peerage, Volume V. Edinburgh: T.A. Constable. 268-269.
- Torrance, D. Richard. (1993). The McClellans in Galloway. Scottish Genealogy Society. p. 88.

Peerage of Scotland
Preceded by Thomas MacLellan	Lord Kirkcudbright; 1647–1665	Succeeded by William MacLellan
