= William MacLellan, 6th Lord Kirkcudbright =

Scottish nobleman

William MacLellan was 6th Lord Kirkcudbright from 1734 to 1762; his son, John, did not present a petition to establish his right to the title of Lord Kirkcudbright until 1767. Born c. 1690 in Borness, Kirkcudbrightshire, Scotland, William was the son of William MacLellan of Balmangan and Agnes McCulloch.

== Biography ==
As indicated in the Register of Edinburgh Apprentices, William MacLellan was apprenticed to John Lennox, skinner, on 22 August 1705. He continued to develop his trade as a leather tanner and glover, selling his goods in the guildhalls of Edinburgh.

William MacLellan married Margaret Murray in Edinburgh, Scotland, on 13 September 1710. They had eleven children: Margaret, Charles, Samuel, Agnes, William, Isobel, James, Edward, Agnes, John, and Mary.

In 1711, John Russell of Bradshaw, an Edinburgh lawyer, lodged a comprehensive accusation against William McClellan. William was the eldest legitimate son and expected heir of the late William McClellan of Balmangan, and also the grandchild of the late Robert McClellan of Balmangan. The accusation pertained to William's attempt to establish himself as the rightful heir to his grandfather's estate. In 1712, William McClellan renounced his rights as heir, because if he entered as heir, it would have been to his greater prejudice, and consequently he gave all his bonds and titles to John Russell. The latter eventually obtained sasine of Chapeltoun and Borness in 1732.

On 2 April 1734 William MacLellan of Borness, glover in Edinburgh, and son to William MacLellan of Balmangan, was specially served heir to James MacLellan, last Lord Kirkcudbright, who was the lineal descendant of Robert, 1st Lord Kirkcudbright, so created Anno 1633; who represented Sir Thomas MacLellan of Bombie, Kirkcudbright, who lived in 1490. This service was clear and well connected. William MacLellan of Borness assumed the title of Lord Kirkcudbright upon the death of James MacLellan, 5th Lord Kirkcudbright, and was served heir-general on 9 April 1734.

On 6 June 1734 a protest was entered by the Earl of Marchmont against the persons claiming to represent the Lords Borthwick, Kirkcudbright, and Rutherford, their titles having lain so very long dormant, and still wanting the sanction of the House of Peers. Another was entered by Ephraim M‘Clellan of Barmagachan, and also by James M‘Clellan, son of the late Provost MacLelan, who claimed the title of Lord Kirkcudbright. Also one by Captain John Rutherford, claiming the title of Lord Rutherford.

MacLellan is sometimes referred to as the 7th Lord Kirkcudbright, a common misconception that arises due to the fact that in 1668, John McClellan of Auchlane, in the Parish of Kelton and the County of Kirkcudbrightshire, made a supplication as heir of the deceased William MacLellan, 4th Lord Kirkcudbright, as nephew of John MacLellan, 3rd Lord Kirkcudbright, but immediately renounced his right as heir because he was pursued by his father William MacLellan of Auchlane's creditors and lacked sufficient funds to pay off his debts. Nevertheless, he is occasionally referred to as a Lord Kirkcudbright, despite the fact that he never possessed the title.

The Lords of Session, on their report on the Union Roll of 1739, stated that William McClellan had voted as Lord Kirkcudbright at the election of Representative Peers in 1734 and at subsequent elections down to 1739. At the election of 1741, a protest was entered against the vote by James McClellan, eldest son of the deceased Sir Samuel McClellan, Lord Provost of Edinburgh, in which he stated that the right to the Peerage had been referred by the King to the Law Officers of the Crown. The votes of both parties seem to have been received. At the next election protests were given in by both claimants: that of William McClellan stated that the Lord Advocate and Solicitor General for Scotland had reported on James McClellan's petition to the effect that he had not made good the allegation that he was nearest heir-male of the first Lord Kirkcudbright, and that in consequence his claim to the peerage fell to the ground. James McClellan lodged another protest, and again both their votes seem to have been taken. James, however, did not pursue his claim further, and William McClellan voted as Lord Kirkcudbright at all subsequent Elections of Peers down to 1761, except that of 1744.

On 27 April 1742 William MacLellan, 6th Lord Kirkcudbright, was among the twenty-three Peers present to elect John [Hay] Marquis of Tweeddale a Peer of Scotland. “Friday last the most honorable John Marquis of Tweeddale was elected at Holyroodhouse (nemine contradicente) one of the sixteen Peers, to represent the Peerage of Scotland in Parliament, in room of Charles Earl of Hoptoun deceased.”

On 30 November 1748 a dispensation passed the Great Seal, to enable Charles Addington, Clerk, M.A. Chaplain to the Right Honorable Lord Kirkcudbright, Baron of Bombie, to hold the Rectory of Litchborough in the County of Northampton, and Diocese of Peterborough, together with one Mediety of the Vicarage of Pattishall, in the same county and diocese.

In 1748, William Lord Kirkcudbright, glover, and Robert McClellan, merchant in Leith who had right by adjudication, entered into a contract of sale with David Thomson for the 8 merkland of Chapeltoun. He received a bounty of £50 annually from King George II from 1758.

On 17 March 1761 the House of Lords ordered that Lord Kirkcudbright along with certain other Peers should lay before the House the grounds of their claims: “Upon reports from the Lords Committee for privileges, to whom it was referred to consider of, and make up a list of the Peers of Scotland at the time of the Union, whose Peerages are still continuing; it is ordered by the Lords Spiritual and Temporal in Parliament, that William Alexander taking upon himself the title Earl of Stirling, Henry Borthwick taking upon himself the title of Lord Borthwick, William MacLellan taking upon himself the title Lord Kirkcudbright, and George Rutherford and David Dury, each of them severally taking upon himself the title of Lord Rutherford, do attend the House, by themselves, or by some persons properly authorized, on the second Monday in the first session of the next Parliament, to show by what authority and upon what grounds they take upon themselves such titles respectively. Ordered, that the Clerk Register of Scotland do cause a copy of this order to be affixed upon the gate of the Palace of Holyroodhouse, and also upon the doors of the parliament-house of Edinburgh. - Ashley Couper, Clk. Parliament, or Morton Clk. Regist.”

William MacLellan of Borness 6th Lord Kirkcudbright was a male heir of Gilbert MacLellan, the brother of Sir William MacLellan of Bombie who fell at Flodden. The 6th Lord Kirkcudbright died c. 1762 and was succeeded by his eldest surviving son, John 7th Lord Kirkcudbright.

William MacLellan's armorial ware is on display at the Stewartry Museum in Kirkcudbright and the Ewart Library in Dumfries, Scotland houses several collections that contain important manuscripts, including John MacClellan's research and notes for "The Record of the House of Kirkcudbright," published by J. Maxwell & Son, 117 & 119 High Street, Dumfries in 1906..
