= List of listed buildings in Borgue, Dumfries and Galloway =

This is a list of listed buildings in the parish of Borgue in Dumfries and Galloway, Scotland.

== List ==
Name	Location	Date Listed	Grid Ref. (Note: Sometimes known as OSGB36, the grid reference (where provided) is based on the British national grid reference system used by the Ordnance Survey. • "Guide to National Grid". Ordnance Survey. • "Get-a-map". Ordnance Survey.)	Geo-coordinates	Notes	LB Number (Note: Historic Environment Scotland assign a unique alphanumeric identifier to each designated site in Scotland, for listed buildings this always begins with "LB", for example "LB12345".)	Image
Knockbrex House, Haha And Garden Walls, Sundial, Gates, Gatepiers And Boundary Walls				54°49′23″N 4°12′17″W	Category B	3396	Upload Photo
Knockbrex Stables				54°49′20″N 4°12′10″W	Category B	3397	Upload Photo
Kirkandrews Chapel, Burial Ground And Boundary Walls				54°48′34″N 4°10′45″W	Category B	3383	Upload another image
Kirkandrews Cottages				54°48′31″N 4°10′46″W	Category B	3385	Upload Photo
Knockbrex Bathing House Including Castellated Former Store To Se				54°49′12″N 4°12′28″W	Category B	3395	Upload Photo
Knockbrex "Toy Fort", Gatepiers, Gates And Boundary Walls				54°49′26″N 4°12′19″W	Category B	3398	Upload another image
Margrie				54°49′37″N 4°11′36″W	Category C(S)	3402	Upload Photo
Borgue Hotel				54°48′43″N 4°08′00″W	Category C(S)	3392	Upload Photo
Chapelton Row				54°48′45″N 4°08′44″W	Category B	3406	Upload Photo
Borgue Old House				54°48′36″N 4°07′40″W	Category A	3393	Upload another image See more images
Little Ross lighthouse				54°45′56″N 4°05′07″W	Category B	3399	Upload Photo
Low Carleton Farmhouse And Old Mill Building				54°49′02″N 4°08′52″W	Category B	3401	Upload Photo
Rockvale Quay, Brighouse Bay				54°47′01″N 4°07′18″W	Category B	6608	Upload Photo
Cairniehill, Farmhouse, Horsemill And Former Threshing Barn				54°47′56″N 4°07′57″W	Category B	3386	Upload Photo
Barmagachan				54°49′14″N 4°09′37″W	Category B	3390	Upload Photo
Balmangan Tower At Balmangan Farm				54°47′17″N 4°06′02″W	Category B	3391	Upload another image See more images
Borgue Village, Memorial To William Nicholson				54°48′45″N 4°08′01″W	Category C(S)	3394	Upload Photo
Senwick House And Gatepiers				54°47′54″N 4°06′29″W	Category B	3404	Upload Photo
Earlston Stables				54°49′40″N 4°08′07″W	Category B	3382	Upload Photo
Kirkandrews Old Church And Churchyard				54°48′30″N 4°10′43″W	Category B	3384	Upload another image
Borgue Parish Church And Churchyard				54°48′39″N 4°08′06″W	Category B	3405	Upload Photo
Chapelton Row, 2 Storey House				54°48′44″N 4°08′41″W	Category B	3379	Upload Photo
Conchieton				54°51′15″N 4°07′29″W	Category B	3380	Upload Photo
Corseyard Farm And Boundary Walls				54°48′44″N 4°11′39″W	Category A	3381	Upload Photo
Little Ross Cottages				54°46′00″N 4°05′04″W	Category B	3400	Upload Photo
Plunton Castle				54°49′55″N 4°10′24″W	Category A	3403	Upload Photo

== Key ==
The scheme for classifying buildings in Scotland is:

- Category A: "buildings of national or international importance, either architectural or historic; or fine, little-altered examples of some particular period, style or building type."
- Category B: "buildings of regional or more than local importance; or major examples of some particular period, style or building type, which may have been altered."
- Category C: "buildings of local importance; lesser examples of any period, style, or building type, as originally constructed or moderately altered; and simple traditional buildings which group well with other listed buildings."

In March 2016 there were 47,288 listed buildings in Scotland. Of these, 8% were Category A, and 50% were Category B, with the remaining 42% being Category C.
