= Hugh Blair (disambiguation) =

Hugh Blair (1718–1800) was a Scottish minister and linguist.

Hugh Blair may also refer to:

- Hugh E. Blair (1909–1967), linguist and artist
- Hugh Blair (composer) (1864–1932), English musician, composer and organist
- Hugh Blair of Borgue (1708–1765), Scottish noble
