= Samuel McClellan (disambiguation) =

Samuel McClellan (1730–1807) was an American general. Samuel McClellan may also refer to:

- Sir Samuel McClellan (c. 1640–1709), Lord Provost of Edinburgh
- Samuel R. McClellan (1806–1890), member of the Wisconsin State Senate

== See also ==
- Sam McClelland (born 2002), Northern Irish footballer
- Samuel McClelland (died 1983), Northern Irish loyalist paramilitary
