= James MacLellan, 5th Lord Kirkcudbright =

Scottish Nobleman (c.1661–1730)

James MacLellan, born c. 1661 at Auchlane Castle in Kelton, Kirkcudbrightshire, Dumfries & Galloway, Scotland, was the 5th Lord Kirkcudbright, a title he held from 1721 until his passing in 1730. He was the son of William MacLellan and Jean McGhie, and his life would be marked by both personal and legal challenges.

== Biography ==
In his early years, James found himself at the heart of local affairs. By November 1682, he was already involved in legal matters, as indicated by a bond of relief while residing at Auchlane. This engagement with the law hinted at the complexities of life that lay ahead. In 1685, he was noted among those who did not attend King James II's coronation procession, a political choice that placed him squarely within the tumultuous landscape of Scotland's shifting allegiances.

James married Marie Drummond, a union that, despite lacking a formal marriage contract, blossomed into a partnership that welcomed three daughters: Janet, Mary, and Margaret. Their lives together were intertwined with property dealings and legal disputes that seemed almost a hallmark of that era. In December 1686, James ensured Marie's financial security with an annual rent of 400 merks, showcasing his commitment to family amidst the uncertainties of land ownership and debt.

The Lords of Kirkcudbright, being no timeservers, but staunch Presbyterians and thorough loyalists, risked all and lost all for, first, conscience, and, then, The Crown; hence the poverty of John, 3rd Lord; James, 5th Lord; and William, 6th Lord.

Lord Kirkcudbright’s dealings with land were significant. In 1686, he transferred land to Samuel McClellan, but this transaction did not quell the disputes that would plague him. By the end of 1687, he faced decrees from various creditors, illustrating the ever-looming pressures of financial obligations. Nevertheless, he continued to navigate these challenges, securing tacks of lands and mills, showcasing a resilience that would define much of his life.

In 1702, James was admitted as a Burgess of Kirkcudbright, a sign of his growing influence and status within the community. By 1710, he was actively engaging in land leases. MacLellan does not appear to have assumed the title Lord Kirkcudbright until his vote was urgently required and was of value in an election of Representative Peers in 1721, when there was a keen contest between the Earls of Aberdeen and Eglinton. His vote was objected to, but he voted at that and subsequent Elections of Peers up to 1727, thus affirming his place in the extensive narrative of Scotland's governance.

The years that followed brought recognition and responsibility. In 1725, he was granted privileges within the Incorporated Trades of Kirkcudbright, reflecting his integration into the economic and social fabric of the town. On 15 Feb 1729, James MacLellan of Auchlane was formally served heir to his uncle John, 3rd Lord Kirkcudbright.

MacLellan is sometimes referred to as the 6th Lord Kirkcudbright, a common misconception that arises due to the fact that in 1668, his brother, John McClellan of Auchlane, made a supplication as heir of the deceased William MacLellan, 4th Lord Kirkcudbright, as nephew of John MacLellan, 3rd Lord Kirkcudbright, but immediately renounced his right as heir because he was pursued by his father William MacLellan of Auchlane's creditors and lacked sufficient funds to pay off his debts. Nevertheless, he is occasionally referred to as a Lord Kirkcudbright, despite the fact that he never possessed the title.

With the death of James, 5th Lord Kirkcudbright in 1730, the succession became the subject of much litigation between the three main claimants: Ephraim McClellan of Barmagachan, James, son of Sir Samuel McClellan, and William McClellan of Borness who eventually succeeded.
