= Camden Gray McClellan, 9th Lord Kirkcudbright =

Scottish nobleman and captain (1774–1832)

Camden Gray McClellan was 9th Lord Kirkcudbright, from 1827 to 1832. The son of John MacLellan, 7th Lord Kirkcudbright, and Elizabeth Bannister, he was born on 20 April 1774 in London, England, and was a captain in the Coldstream Guards.

== Background ==
According to the Coldstream Guards Regimental Archives, Captain Camden Gray McClellan & Ensign James Richard Lewis Lloyd faced a Court Martial at Chelsea College on 8 April 1803 for a somewhat trivial matter. During dinner at the Royal Artillery Barracks mess in Chatham Square, Captain McClellan declined more wine, revealing he had a date with Ensign Lloyd's wife. The situation escalated to a physical altercation, leading to their arrest and subsequent trial. Captain MacLellan was dismissed from service for instigating the incident, while Ensign Lloyd was suspended and deprived of pay for six months. This caused McClellan considerable public shame and humiliation, resulting in his social isolation and exclusion from refined circles, ultimately convincing him to move abroad.

On 23 March 1819 the Right Honourable Camden Gray McClellan, of Saint Marylebone Parish Church in the County of Middlesex, on Buckingham Street, Fitzroy Square, London, married Sarah Gorges Thomas.

Camden Gray McClellan succeeded to the hereditary honor of Lord Kirkcudbright in 1827 upon the death of his brother Sholto Henry McClellan, 8th Lord Kirkcudbright.

McClellan is sometimes referred to as 10th Lord Kirkcudbright; a common misconception that arises due to the fact that in 1668, John McClellan of Auchlane, in the Parish of Kelton and the County of Kirkcudbrightshire, made a supplication as heir of the deceased William MacLellan 4th Lord Kirkcudbright, as nephew of John MacLellan 3rd Lord Kirkcudbright, but immediately renounced his right as heir because he was pursued by his father William MacLellan of Auchlane’s creditors and lacked sufficient funds to payoff his debts. Nevertheless, he is occasionally referred to as a Lord Kirkcudbright, despite the fact that he never possessed the title.

Camden and Sarah had a daughter named Camden Elizabeth McClellan, who was baptized at the Church of St John the Baptist, Cardiff, Glamorgan on 23 January 1806.

In the absence of a male heir, Sarah became the Dowager Lady Kirkcudbright, and the Lordship peerage became dormant when Camden Gray McClellan died on 19 April 1832 in Bruges, Flanders, West-Vlaanderen, Belgium.

Due to the unusual terms outlined in the patent establishing the title Lord Kirkcudbright, which specified that the peerage could pass to any male heir who bears the name MacLellan and thus the Coat of Arms of Lord Kirkcudbright, a condition later confirmed by the House of Lords to extend the peerage to any male heirs, the title is considered dormant rather than extinct. If an individual can demonstrate continuous lineage in the male line from any of the Lords Kirkcudbright and prove that all senior lines have ceased without male descendants, they could request the current Lord Lyon King of Arms to grant them the title Lord Kirkcudbright.

Camden Gray McClellan is buried in the Protestant section of the Centrale Begraafplaats Assebroek (main cemetery at Assebroek) located at Kleine Kerkhofstraat 62, 8310 Brugge, Belgium, just outside the old city walls. Section 10, Lot 44.
