= William MacLellan, 4th Lord Kirkcudbright =

William MacLellan
- 4th Lord Kirkcudbright

Lord Kirkcudbright
- Reign: 1665–1668
- Predecessor: John Maclellan, 3rd Lord Kirkcudbright
- Born: c. 1647; Borgue, Kirkcudbrightshire, Scotland
- Died: 29 March 1668
- Parents: John Maclellan, 3rd Lord Kirkcudbright; Ann Maxwell

William MacLellan, 4th Lord Kirkcudbright (c. 1647 – 29 March 1668) was a Scottish peer and the fourth holder of the Lordship of Kirkcudbright. He succeeded his father, John Maclellan, 3rd Lord Kirkcudbright, in 1665 and held the title until his death in 1668.

== Early life ==
William MacLellan was born into the MacLellan family of Galloway, a family associated with the barony of Bombie and the royal burgh of Kirkcudbright. His father, John MacLellan, 3rd Lord Kirkcudbright, was a Scottish peer whose family had long held influence in the region. His mother was Ann Maxwell.

William succeeded his father as Lord Kirkcudbright in 1665. His tenure was brief, lasting only until his death on 29 March 1668.

== Political and religious context ==
MacLellan's lordship occurred during significant political and religious tension in Scotland following the Restoration of Charles II. The re-establishment of episcopal government in the Church of Scotland led to resistance among Covenanters, resulting in the Pentland Rising of 1666 and subsequent government repression of Presbyterian dissent.

Scotland was affected by wider conflicts and crises, including the Second Anglo-Dutch War, economic disruption, and outbreaks of plague. Charles II's government sought to strengthen royal authority in Scotland, increasing tensions with Presbyterian communities.

Although William held the Kirkcudbright title during this turbulent period, there is no evidence that he played a major public role in these national conflicts.

== Financial Difficulties and Succession Dispute ==
During MacLellan's lifetime, the MacLellan family's estates became heavily burdened by debt. He died unmarried and without issue on 29 March 1668, after which questions arose concerning the succession to the Kirkcudbright title and the associated family estates.

Following his death, succession was opened to descendants of William MacLellan of Auchlane.

In 1668, John McClellan of Auchlane presented a supplication claiming to be MacLellan's heir, as nephew of John Maclellan, 3rd Lord Kirkcudbright. However, he immediately renounced his right as heir because he was pursued by his father William MacLellan of Auchlane's creditors and lacked sufficient funds to discharge the debts.

Although John McClellan of Auchlane is occasionally associated with the Kirkcudbright succession in later genealogical accounts, he never possessed the title of Lord Kirkcudbright.

William MacLellan's short tenure contributed to later uncertainty surrounding the Kirkcudbright succession. Because he died young and without issue, later claims to the title depended upon competing interpretations of family descent and inheritance.
