= Balmangan Tower =

- Near Borgue, Dumfries and Galloway, Scotland; UK grid reference NX650457
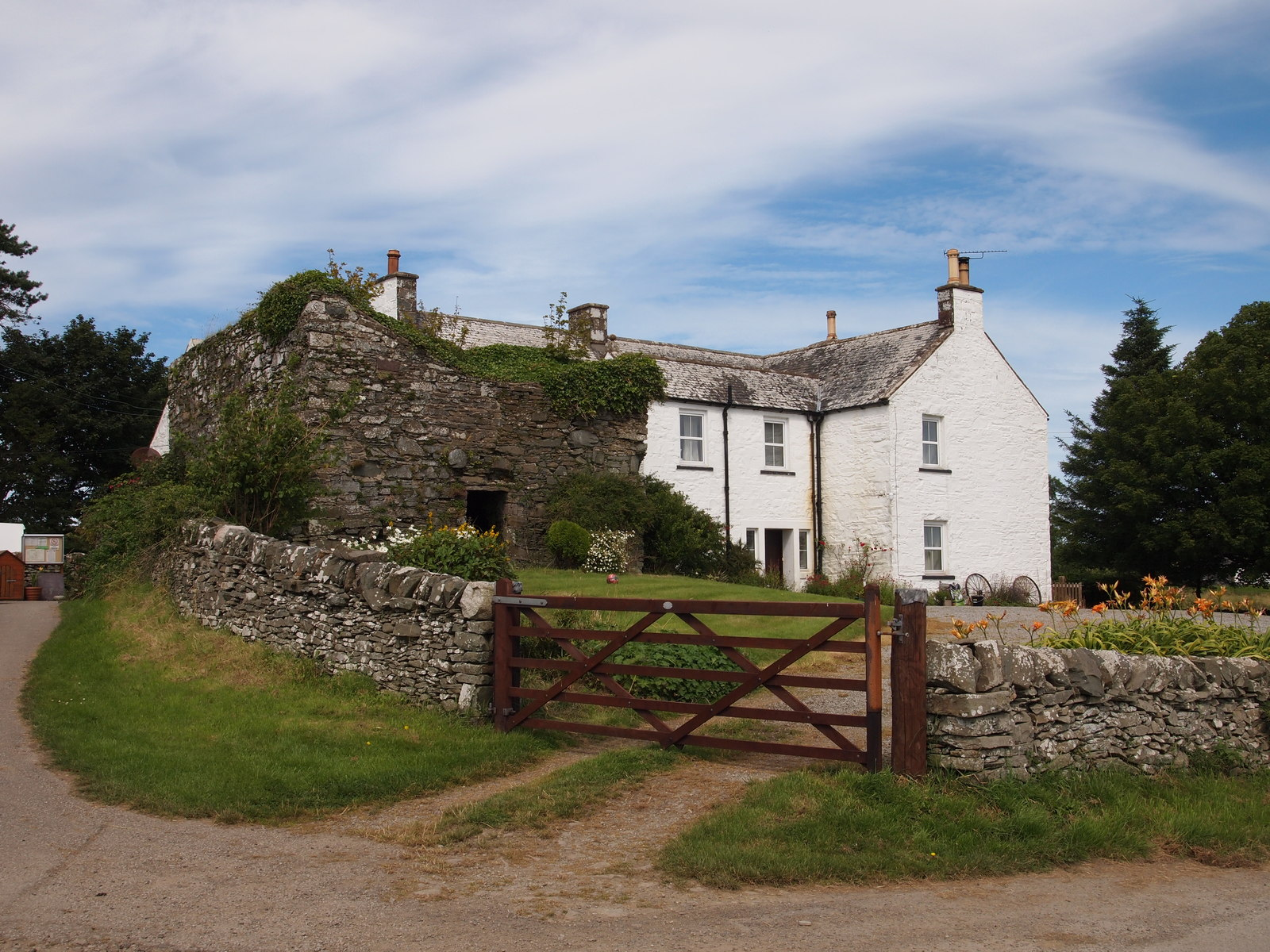
- Ground floor and vaulted basement of Balmangan Tower

Site information
- Type: Oblong plan Tower house
- Owner: Private
- Condition: Ruined

Location
- Shown within Scotland
- Coordinates: 54.788438°N 4.100221°W

Site history
- Built: 16th Century
- Materials: Stone

Balmangan Tower is a ruined 16th-century tower house situated near Borgue, Dumfries and Galloway.
