= Sholto Henry MacLellan, 8th Lord Kirkcudbright =

Scottish nobleman (1769–1827)

Sholto Henry MacLellan (1 September 1769 – 16 April 1827) was a Scottish peer who succeeded as the 8th Lord Kirkcudbright in 1801 and held the title until his death.

== Early life and education ==
MacLellan was born at Cowes, Isle of Wight, Hampshire, the son of John MacLellan, 7th Lord Kirkcudbright, and his wife Elizabeth (née Bannister).

He was educated at Tonbridge School and was admitted to Pembroke College, Cambridge, on 18 June 1790. He proceeded M.A. in 1792.

== Clerical Career ==
Following his university education, MacLellan was ordained on 27 December 1793. He served as curate of Warfield, Berkshire, receiving a stipend of £30 per annum, and also served as curate of New Windsor, Berkshire. The duration of these appointments is not known.

== Lord Kirkcudbright ==
MacLellan succeeded his father as Lord Kirkcudbright on 24 December 1801. During his tenure he participated in elections of Scottish representative peers at Holyrood Palace in Edinburgh.

MacLellan is occasionally referred to as the 9th Lord Kirkcudbright. This confusion derives from John MacLellan of Auchlane, who in 1668 claimed succession following the death of William MacLellan, 4th Lord Kirkcudbright, but subsequently renounced the claim. Although some later accounts included him in the numbering of the Lords Kirkcudbright, he never possessed the title. Sholto Henry MacLellan is therefore correctly numbered as the 8th Lord Kirkcudbright.

== Public Life ==
Several contemporary newspapers reported on Lord Kirkcudbright's appearances before magistrates and involvement in public disputes.

In September 1807, Ann Lunden brought a charge of assault against Lord Kirkcudbright. Evidence presented to the court stated that Lunden had attempted to fend off one of his dogs with a walking stick. Witnesses testified that Lord Kirkcudbright kicked her and verbally abused her. The court found the charge proven and fined him £20.

In July 1817, Lord Kirkcudbright and his servant, J. Watts, were charged with assaulting John Penning in Marlborough Street. The dispute arose when Penning objected to the removal of furniture from rented premises before rent had been paid. Newspaper reports stated that Lord Kirkcudbright threatened Penning with a pistol and that Watts challenged him to fight. After an agreement had been reached between the parties, the magistrates discharged the case upon Lord Kirkcudbright entering into bail.

In April 1825, Lord Kirkcudbright appeared before magistrates after breaking two panes of glass in the drawing-room window of Mrs Kilner's adjoining house. He stated that he had acted because of what he considered impertinent looks from Mrs Kilner's sons. The matter was settled after he agreed to pay 12 shillings in damages and 4 shillings in costs.

== Depictions in Satire ==
Lord Kirkcudbright appeared in a number of satirical prints during the late eighteenth and early nineteenth centuries. Several examples are held by the British Museum, including works by John Cawse, Isaac Cruikshank, James Gillray, Nicolaus Heideloff, William Holland, and Charles Williams.

== Marriage ==
Lord Kirkcudbright married Mary Cantes at Braughing, Hertfordshire, on 28 March 1820.

== Death and Burial ==
Lord Kirkcudbright died at Redberry Lodge, Southampton, on 16 April 1827.

The Morning Post reported:

This Nobleman died at Southampton, a few days since, in the 59th year of his age. His Lordship was short in stature, and somewhat deformed in person. With some eccentricities, we understand he possessed many good qualities.

The newspaper further noted that he was succeeded by his brother, Camden Gray McClellan, 9th Lord Kirkcudbright, an officer in the Coldstream Guards.

MacLellan was buried in the parish of Millbrook, Hampshire, on 28 April 1827.

Records associated with the later clearance of Millbrook Old Cemetery indicate that his memorial no longer survived by the time the cemetery's remaining monuments were surveyed in 1988–1989.
