= Borgue Old House =

Ruined tower house in Scotland

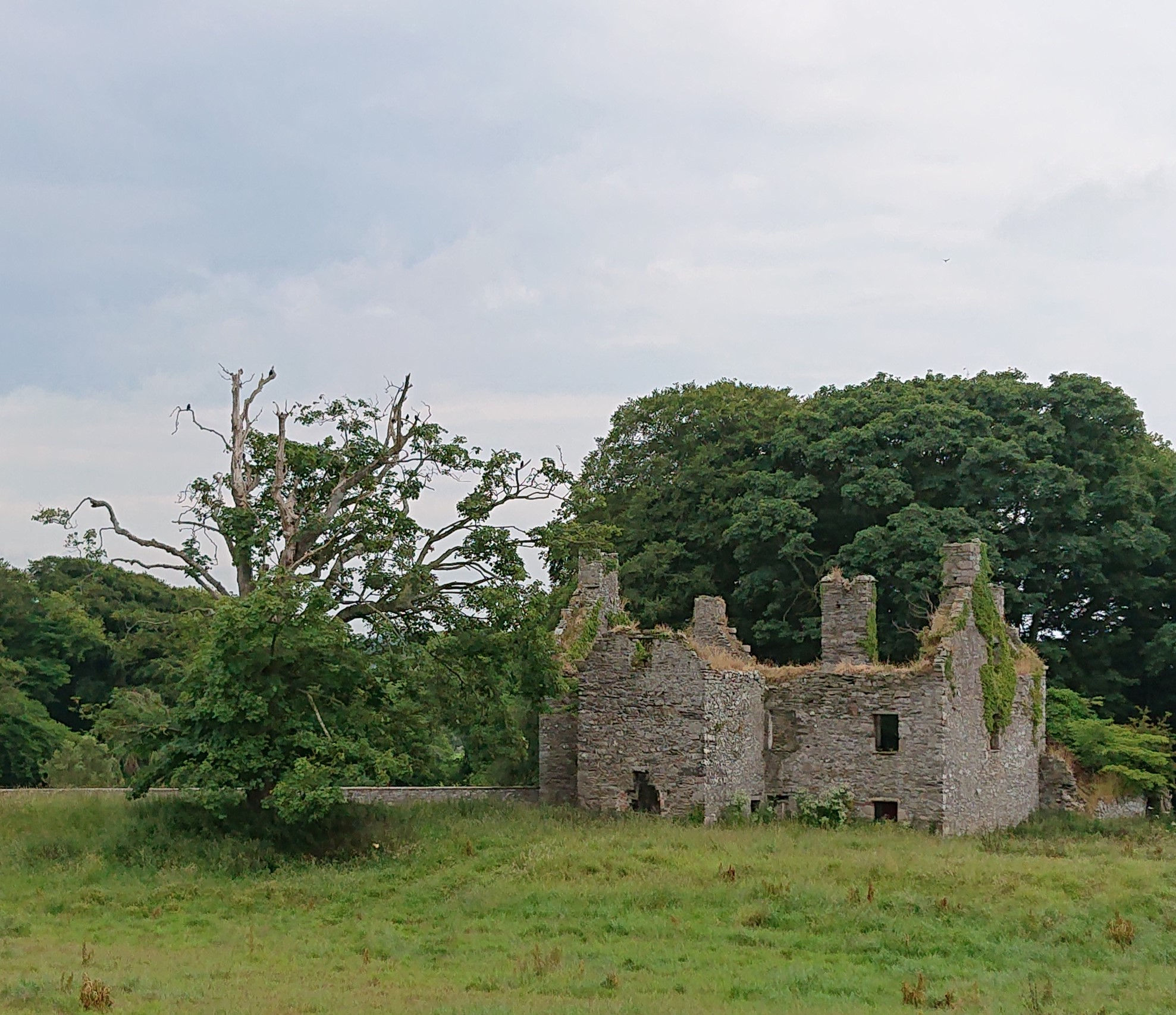

- Location of the tower within Dumfries and Galloway
- 54°48′36″N 4°07′40″W
- Type: Tower house
- Location: Borgue, Dumfries and Galloway

Listed Building – Category A
- Designated: 1971
- Reference no.: LB3393

Borgue Old House is a ruined Y-plan house, about 300 metres (0.2 mi) east of Borgue in Dumfries and Galloway, Scotland. Built in 1680, but probably incorporating the fabric of an older building, its large main block has two projecting wings at either end of its south face; another wing in the middle of the north face probably contained the stairway, but this is no longer present. Each of the two main stories has three interconnecting rooms, on in each of the wings on the south face, and one in the main block. The main block would also have had an attic, but is now roofless.

The main entrance, with molded stonework surround, is in the south face of the main block. Also in the south wall is a surviving chimney which rises above the wall level. On the ground floor is a large mantelpiece, with a lintel supported by corbels; architectural historian John Gifford asserts that this fireplace cannot be older than the early seventeenth century, and thus must be part of the older building that the house was built around. There is a single-storey building attached to the south-east wing, which probably formed part of a courtyard when the building was in use, and there is a large garden, probably laid out in the eighteenth century, partially enclosed by rubble walls. Nearby is the current Borgue House, a nineteenth-century mansion, which is still in use.

Borgue Old House was the home of Hugh Blair of Borgue, an eccentric laird whose unusual behaviour has led modern scholars to speculate that he may have had autism spectrum disorder.

The house was designated a Category A listed building in 1971. As of 2014, the Buildings at Risk Register for Scotland records that the upper parts of the walls and chimneys are precariously balanced, and that the inside is overgrown.

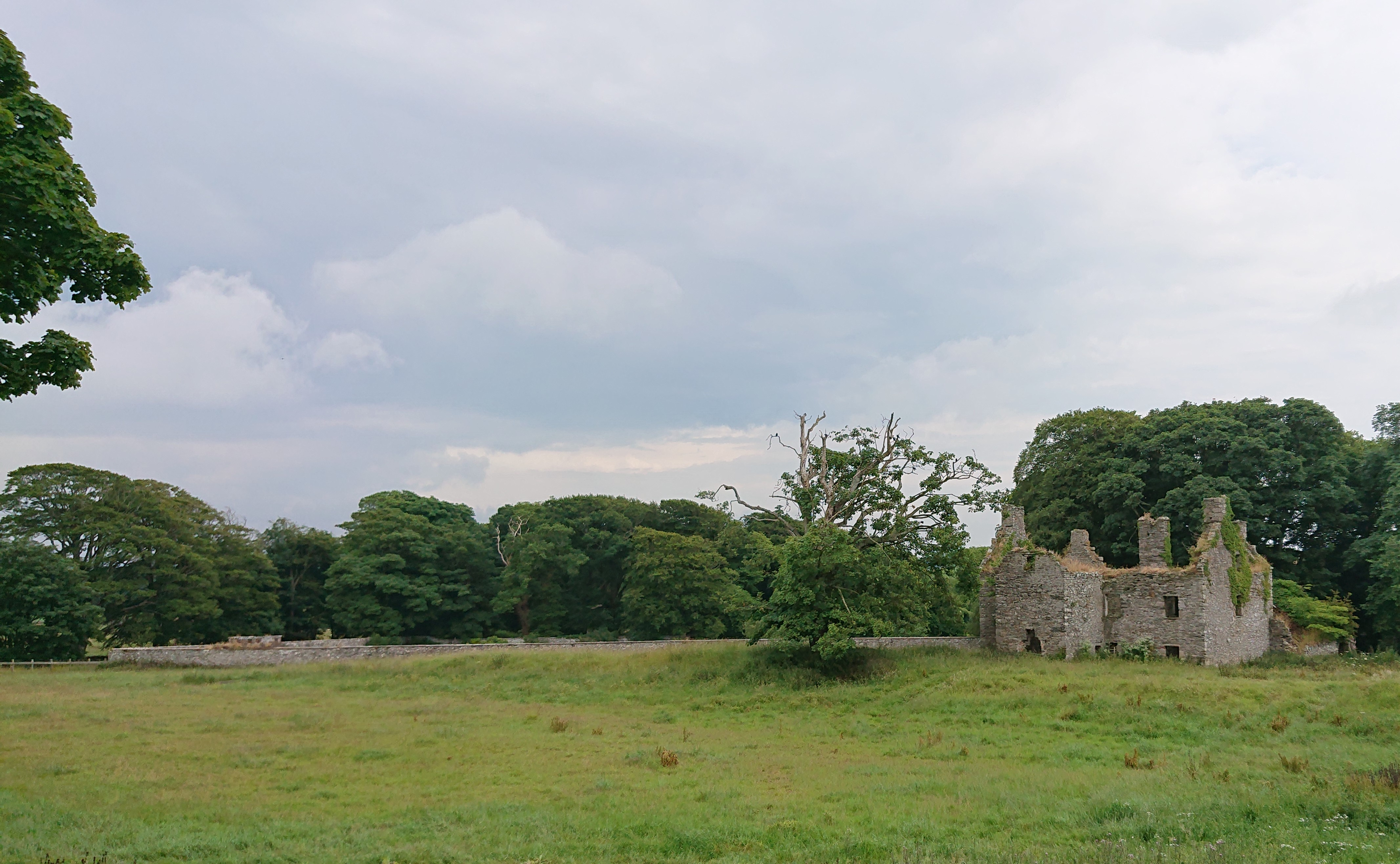
Borgue Old House with its walled garden in the background

== Sources ==
- "Borgue Old House, Borgue". Buildings at Risk Register for Scotland.
- Gifford, John (1996). The Buildings of Scotland:Dumfries and Galloway. London: Penguin. ISBN 0140-71067-1.
- Historic Environment Scotland. "Borgue Old House (Category A Listed Building LB3393)".
- Houston, Rab; Frith, Uta (2000). Autism in History: The Case of Hugh Blair of Borgue. Wiley-Blackwell. ISBN 978-0-631-22088-6.
- Hume, John R (2000). Dumfries and Galloway: An Illustrated Architectural Guide. Edinburgh: The Rutland Press. ISBN 1-873-190-344.
