= Sheila Lavelle =

English children's writer (1939–2001)

- Born: Sheila Edmundson; 1939
- Died: 2001 (aged 62)
- Writing career
- Genre: Children's literature

Sheila Lavelle (née Edmundson, 1939–2001), was an English children's writer. She is best known for the Ursula Bear and My Best Fiend series; the latter was a best-seller. In 1993, she was described as "one of the most successful children's authors in Britain".

== Early life and education ==
Sheila Edmundson was born in 1939 in Dunston, Gateshead. She attended Dunston Grammar School. She trained to be a teacher in Birmingham.

== Career ==
Lavelle worked as a teacher in infant schools for ten years. She stopped teaching after becoming ill. Her first book was Ursula Bear (1977). She had previously written fiction for magazines. In 1991, she said that she wrote four or five books each year. By 1994, she had published over forty books.

In 1991 Lavelle was awarded the 1990 East Kilbride Children's Book Award. Following the award, she visited 22 local schools to talk to children.

Lavelle said of her writing that "My experience as a teacher been invaluable. I know the reading capabilities of young children and know from my own experiences of the classroom what kind of stories go down well". She said "I do not write down to my readers or keep the vocabulary simple. Children need a challenge when reading to extend their own vocabulary".

The My Best Fiend series is described by Julie Cross in Humor in Contemporary Junior Literature (2010) as "featur[ing] the antics of Angela, a deliberately transgressive, even cruel girl, whose practical jokes are relayed and narrated by her friend Charlie, who frequently suffers at the hands of Angela". The East Kilbride News described the series as "very funny ... [with] wicked and inventive humour".

One of her books, The Chocolate Candy Kid (1986), was included in the "Toppers" series for reluctant readers, published by Marilyn Malin.

Her books were read as audiobooks by Jill Bennett. In 1991 My Best Fiend was read on BBC Radio 5 by Annabelle Lanyon. In 1991, there was a plan to televise the My Best Fiend series. Most of Lavelle's books were illustrated by Thelma Lambert.

In 1993, Lavelle said she visited about twenty libraries and schools a year to talk to children about her books. She attended book fairs too.

== Reception ==
Julia Eccleshare, writing in The Guardian, recommended Lavelle's Ursula Bear (1977), "the delightful story of a little girl who can turn herself into a bear with the help of a magic spell she has learnt from a library book". The Signal Review of Children's Books said of More Adventures of Ursula Bear (1983) that "The stories of a little girl who can turn herself into a bear are much enjoyed by older infants". New Books for Boys & Girls wrote of The Disappearing Granny (1985) that "Sheila Lavelle's gift for lively dialogue and brisk action makes this a good choice for younger readers". Dorothy Butler, in Babies Need Books (1988), called Everybody said No! (1978) "uproarious". The Junior Bookshelf said of Calamity with the Fiend (1994) that "Sheila Lavelle has a nice line in malapropisms which should amuse the more sophisticated".

== Personal life ==
Lavelle was married to Derek; they had two children. In 1989 she and her husband moved to Borgue, Dumfries and Galloway, Scotland. They had previously lived in Buckinghamshire.

She died in 2001, aged 62.

== Selected books ==
=== Ursula Bear ===
- Ursula Bear (1977, Gazelle Books, Hamish Hamilton)
- Ursula Dancing (1979, Hamish Hamilton)
- More Adventures of Ursula Bear (1983, Beaver Books)
- Ursula Riding (1985, Hamish Hamilton)
- Ursula by the Sea (1986, Hamish Hamilton)
- Ursula Camping (1986, Young Corgi)
- Ursula on the Farm (1987, Hamish Hamilton)
- Ursula Sailing (1987, Young Corgi)
- Ursula Climbing (1988, Young Corgi)
- Ursula Exploring (1989, Young Corgi)
- Ursula Flying (1989, Young Corgi)
- Ursula Skiing (1989, Hamish Hamilton)
- Ursula in the Snow (1989, Hamish Hamilton)
- Ursula Swimming (1990, Hamish Hamilton)
- Ursula Ballooning (1992, Hamish Hamilton)
- Ursula on Safari (1992, Hamish Hamilton)

=== My Best Fiend ===
- My Best Fiend (1980, Young Lions)
- The Fiend Next Door (1983, Young Lions)
- Disaster with the Fiend (1988, Young Lions)
- Calamity with the Fiend (1994, Puffin Books)
- Trouble with the Fiend (1995, Young Lions)
- Holiday with the Fiend (1997, Puffin Books)
- Revenge of the Fiend (1997, Puffin Books)

=== Harry series ===
- Harry's Horse (1987, Hamish Hamilton)
- Harry's Dog (1988, Hamish Hamilton)
- Harry's Hamster (1990, Hamish Hamilton)
- Harry's Cat (1992, Hamish Hamilton)
- Harry's Aunt (1995, Puffin Books)

=== Webster series ===
- Wake up, Webster! (1994, Longman)
- Webster and the Treacle Toffee (1994, Longman)
- Webster the World's Worst Dog (1994, Longman)
- Webster's Week (1994, Longman)

=== Maisy series ===
- Messy Maisy; Maisy's measles (1991, Young Piper)
- Maisy in the Mud (1992, Pan Macmillan)
- Maisy in the Mud; Maisy's Masterpiece (1994, Young Piper)

=== Other ===
- Everybody said No! (1978, A & C Black
- Oliver Ostrich (1978, A & C Black)
- Too Many Husbands (1978, Hamish Hamilton)
- Mr Ginger's Potato (1981, A & C Black)
- Myrtle Turtle (1981, A & C Black)
- The Disappearing Granny (1985, Mammoth Books)
- The Chocolate Candy Kid (1986, Marilyn Malin Books)
- The Boggy Bay Marathon (1987, Orchard)
- The Topsy-Turvy Teacher (1988, Orchard)
- Copycat (1989, Hodder & Stoughton)
- The Strawberry-Jam Pony (1989, Puffin)
- Fish Stew (1990, Paperbird)
- Monica's Monster (1990, Hodder & Stoughton)
- Sunil's Bad Dream (1990, Ginn)
- Wincey's Worm (1991, Hodder & Stoughton)
- The Apple Pie Alien (1993, Orchard)
- The Big Stink (1993, Mammoth)
- The Dognapper (1993, Heinemann)
- Snowy, the Christmas Dog (1994, Oxford University Press)
- Spots in Space (1994, Orchard Books)
- Tomasina's Twin (1994, Longman)
- Fetch the Slipper (1997, Puffin)
- Tiger (1999, Orchard)
