= Thomas Maclellan, 2nd Lord Kirkcudbright =

Scottish nobleman

Thomas MacLellan, born c. 1605 at Glenshinnoch (present-day Orchardton Castle), Auchencairn, Kirkcudbrightshire, Scotland, was the 2nd Lord Kirkcudbright, a title he held from 1639 his passing in 1647.

== Biography ==
Thomas was the son of William MacLellan of Glenshinnoch and Rosina Agnew. His father's brother was Robert MacLellan 1st Lord Kirkcudbright. As the eldest surviving son, Thomas inherited his father’s rights and titles after the death of his elder brothers. In 1608, Thomas was formally recognized as his father's lawful son and was designated as heir to the estate of Glenshinnoch.

Thomas MacLellan was admitted as a burgess of Kirkcudbright on 17 October 1638, as the "Rycht honorabill maister of Kirkcudbright." Despite his status, MacLellan faced significant financial pressure in the early years of his inheritance. In 1639, he entered into an agreement with Lieutenant Colonel William Stewart to alleviate his debts. Through this contract, MacLellan transferred several properties, including the mill of Bardrochwood, the lands of Graddock, and other holdings in exchange for financial relief. However, by 1642, MacLellan had managed to recover much of the land that had been mortgaged by his late uncle. On 5 February 1642, he and his wife received a charter for various estates, including Twynholm, Bombie, Loch Fergus, and others, securing his family's lands and wealth once again.

A staunch Presbyterian, MacLellan was a committed Covenanter—one of the faction of Scots who opposed King Charles I’s attempts to impose Anglican reforms on the Church of Scotland. He played an active role in the military campaigns that followed, fighting for the Covenanter cause against the Royalists.

In 1639, Thomas MacLellan commanded a regiment of 600 Scots at the Battle of Duns Law, where the Covenanter forces, led by Alexander Leslie, defeated the Royalists. The following year, he was appointed Colonel of the South Regiment of Cavalry, part of the larger Scottish force that invaded England under Leslie's command. McLellan typically marched at the head of his regiment and carried a barrel of brandy to distribute freely to his soldiers. His regiment was stationed in and around Newcastle by September 1640, where they would stay for nearly a year.

As part of the military campaign of 1640, MacLellan's regiment was stationed in the town of Dumfries, where it imposed a significant burden on the local population. The townspeople complained to the Committee of Estates about the strain placed on their resources, as the regiment's presence caused food shortages and economic hardship. On 10 December 1640, a letter from the committee acknowledged these grievances and instructed MacLellan to relieve the town by dividing his forces into smaller units.

In 1641, MacLellan was implicated in the controversial "Incident of August 1641," a failed plot to strengthen King Charles I’s position in Scotland by eliminating rival noble factions, notably the Marquises of Argyll and Hamilton. Though MacLellan’s role remains unclear, several accounts suggest that he was involved in secret meetings with other Scottish Lords, discussing ways to secure the King’s authority. While this event caused significant tension, MacLellan's involvement did not seem to diminish his standing within the Covenanter movement.

In 1643, Thomas MacLellan was given command of one of the seven regiments raised by the Committee of Estates for the defense of Scotland and against Royalist forces in England. MacLellan’s regiment was involved in several key battles during the war.

One of the most notable engagements in which MacLellan participated was the Battle of Corbridge on 19 February 1644, part of the ongoing conflict between the Covenanter army and Royalist forces. MacLellan’s cavalry played an essential role in a series of charges against Royalist troops led by Sir Marmaduke Langdale. While the Covenanter forces won two successful charges, the third charge was repelled, and MacLellan’s soldiers were forced to retreat. Despite this setback, MacLellan’s regiment later succeeded in defeating Colonel Robert Brandling’s forces in a rear engagement during the retreat.

In the Siege of Newcastle and the subsequent military campaigns in Cumbria, MacLellan's regiment remained active, advancing into England to support the Covenanter forces under the Earl of Leven. His regiment participated in the Siege of Carlisle, where he commanded a key segment of the besieging forces and led cavalry against Royalist defenders.

During the Siege of Carlisle, MacLellan became embroiled in a dispute with Lieutenant Colonel Beecher, who was commanding forces at Botcherby Mount near the city. MacLellan argued that he held seniority and should assume command of the entire siege operation, but Beecher refused, citing his own orders from Sir Wilfred Lawson. The dispute was a reflection of the increasingly fractious nature of the Covenanter-parliamentarian alliance, where internal rivalries often undermined military coordination. Although MacLellan attempted to undermine Beecher by accusing him of being anti-Covenanter, the conflict resulted in MacLellan being sidelined temporarily, with his regiment’s movements becoming more limited.

MacLellan’s fortunes were restored following the Covenanter victory at the Battle of Philiphaugh on 13 September 1645. His cavalry played an important role in the engagement, where the Covenanter forces defeated the Royalist troops. His regiment also served in various campaigns throughout Scotland and Northern England during the final years of the war, including expeditions to Aberdeen and Banff in October 1645.

Despite his involvement in the war, MacLellan’s military career began to wind down after February 1647, when his regiment was disbanded by order of the Committee of Estates. At the time, MacLellan was informed that he would receive £12,963 in arrears due to his troops, but he was soon ordered to disband them. After this, MacLellan traveled to Ireland, where he died in May 1647, just a few months after the disbandment of his forces.

Thomas MacLellan married Jonet Douglas, the daughter of William, 1st Earl of Queensberry, on 28 July 1640. Their marriage was a strategic alliance with one of the most powerful families in southern Scotland. However, their union did not produce any surviving children, as Jonet Douglas died in 1651. MacLellan was succeeded by his cousin, John MacLellan 3rd Lord Kirkcudbright.
