= Patrick Johnston (Scottish politician) =

Scottish merchant and politician

Sir Patrick Johnston (1650–1736) of Edinburgh was a Scottish merchant and politician who sat in the Parliament of Scotland from 1702 to 1707 and as a Whig in the British House of Commons between 1707 and 1713. He was Lord Provost of Edinburgh three times from 1700 to 1702, from 1704 to 1706, and from 1708 to 1710.

== Early life ==
Johnston was the son of Archibald Johnston, 2nd Laird of Hilton (1630–1671) and his wife, Catherine Winram. He was apprenticed to Robert Blackwood, an Edinburgh merchant in 1677 and became burgess of Edinburgh in 1684. He married Margaret Kynnear (Kinnear) on 9 June 1684. He became involved in local politics in Edinburgh, and was a merchant councilor in 1694 and bailie in 1695. In 1695 he was one of the 30 men who set up the "Company of Scotland Trading in Africa and the Indies" generally just called the Company of Scotland. The company collapsed in 1698 after the ill-fated Darien Scheme an attempt to colonise Panama and all investors, including Johnston, lost a fortune. He was baron bailie for Canongate in 1696 and bailie for Edinburgh again in 1699

== Political career ==
In 1700 Johnstone became Lord Provost of Edinburgh in succession to Sir George Home of Kello. It was not allowed for anyone to serve for more than two consecutive years as Provost and in 1702 he was succeeded by Hugh Cunningham of Bonnington. He was knighted before 1702. In 1702, he was elected Burgh Commissioner for Edinburgh. He became a member of the Scottish Privy Council from 1702 to 1704. In 1704 he became Provost again for two years and was also Privy Counsellor again for two years. He was appointed to the commission for union with England in 1706, as a gesture towards the capital's governing body. He managed to obtain important concessions for Edinburgh, such as the continuation of the ale duty; and the majority of the council was persuaded to support union with England. The people of Edinburgh were unconvinced, and let out their frustration on Johnstone. In October 1706 his house was attacked by the mob, ‘who threw stones at his windows, broke open his doors and searched his house for him, but he had narrowly made his escape. In parliament he generally voted for the Court.

After the Union of 1707 he was one of the Scottish representatives to the first Parliament of Great Britain and was appointed Commissioner of the Equivalent. On 19 November 1707, he presented a petition to the House from Scottish merchants complaining of the English failure to live up to promises of free trade under the Union. He was also involved in the drafting a bill to encourage the salmon fishery on 2 February 1708. He not stand at the 1708 British general election, giving way to Sir Samuel McClellan, who was then Provost of Edinburgh. He was re-elected as Provost in September 1708 for a unique third term of office. After the death of McClellan he was returned as Member of Parliament at a by-election on 25 November 1709. In January 1710 he reported that he had obtained an exemption from the coal tax and a reduction in the window tax, both of which would benefit Edinburgh. He voted for the impeachment of Dr Sacheverell to support the administration and through his personal convictions. He was returned as a Whig at the 1710 British general election. He voted for the ‘No Peace without Spain’ motion 7 December 1711 and opposed the Scottish toleration bill on 21 Jan. 1712. He also sought financial aid for the construction of a new dock at Leith, but was unsuccessful. He did not stand at the 1713 British general election or after.

== Death and legacy ==
Johnston died on 7 September 1736. He and his wife had at least 11 children many of whom died in infancy. His eldest son, Patrick, followed him in trade but did not aspire to a political career. Other surviving sons included Cpt. George Johnston of Kimmerghame and Monkstown (1686–1770). His daughter Harriet married Sir John Warrender son of Sir George Warrender, 1st Baronet. Sir George Warrender was Lord Provost from 1713 to 1715. He was grandfather to General James Johnston governor of Minorca (George's son).

Parliament of Scotland
Preceded by Sir Robert Cheislie; Alexander Thomson	Burgh Commissioner for Edinburgh; 1702–1707; With: Robert Inglis	Succeeded by Parliament of Great Britain
Parliament of Great Britain
New parliament	Member of Parliament for Scotland; 1707–1708	Constituency split
Preceded by Sir Samuel MacClellan	Member of Parliament for Edinburgh; 1709–1713	Succeeded by Sir James Stewart
