= Bodellick =

Coordinates: 50.5211°N 4.8872°W

- Location within Cornwall
- OS grid reference: SW954731
- Civil parish: St Breock
- Shire county: Cornwall
- Region: South West
- Country: England
- Sovereign state: United Kingdom
- Police: Devon and Cornwall
- Fire: Cornwall
- Ambulance: South Western

Bodellick is a hamlet in Cornwall, England, UK. It lies south of the tidal River Camel approximately one mile west of Wadebridge.
