= Bograxie =

Coordinates: 57.26°N 02.49°W

- Location within Aberdeenshire
- OS grid reference: NJ7019
- Council area: Aberdeenshire
- Lieutenancy area: Aberdeenshire
- Country: Scotland
- Sovereign state: United Kingdom
- Police: Scotland
- Fire: Scottish
- Ambulance: Scottish

Bograxie is a farm in Aberdeenshire, Scotland.

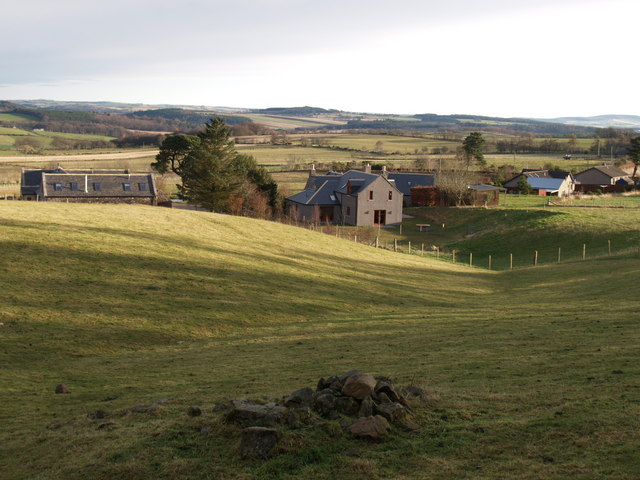
Houses and farm buildings at Bograxie
