= Bosporthennis =

Hamlet in Cornwall, England

Coordinates: 50.1728°N 5.5877°W

Bosporthennis: Cornish: Bosporthenys
- Location within Cornwall
- OS grid reference: SW438364
- Civil parish: Zennor
- Unitary authority: Cornwall
- Shire county: Cornwall
- Region: South West
- Country: England
- Sovereign state: United Kingdom
- Post town: Penzance
- Postcode district: TR20
- Police: Devon and Cornwall
- Fire: Cornwall
- Ambulance: South Western
- UK Parliament: St Ives

Bosporthennis (Cornish: Bosporthenys, meaning dwelling of the isolated cove) is a hamlet south of Treen in the civil parish of Zennor on the Penwith peninsula in west Cornwall, England, United Kingdom.

== Antiquities ==
There is a scattered settlement of at least three courtyard houses dating from the Late Iron Age at the eastern foot of Hannibal's Carn. The best preserved has walls up to 1.5 metres high, with an adjoining paddock. Another has a late medieval cowhouse built inside its walls. Within the settlement there is a feature called the Bosporthennis Beehive Hut (grid reference SW43603607), which has been identified as an above ground fogou, similar to the round, subterranean chamber at Carn Euny. This identification is considered doubtful, Clark discussed the structure and concluded that it does not possess enough of the usual features of a fogou for it to be regarded as such. The Bosporthennis chamber, made of corbelled stone, is 4 metres across and is connected to a smaller oblong chamber, originally the entrance, 3.3 metres by 2.1 metres, both are now roofless.

Bosporthennis Quoit (grid reference SW43563654) is a portal dolmen laying within a mound 6 metres across and 0.8 metres high. Three of the original four upright stones survive, of which one is 1.5 metres high, and the chamber is 1.5 by 1.3 metres. The capstone currently has a diameter of 1.6 metres, and is very round as it had been trimmed for use as a millstone. When excavated in 1872 sherds of pottery were found alongside calcined bones.
