= Boslymon =

Coordinates: 50.4234°N 4.7003°W

Boslymon: Cornish: Bosseleven
- Location within Cornwall
- OS grid reference: SX0861
- Shire county: Cornwall
- Region: South West
- Country: England
- Sovereign state: United Kingdom
- Post town: Bodmin
- Postcode district: PL30
- Police: Devon and Cornwall
- Fire: Cornwall
- Ambulance: South Western

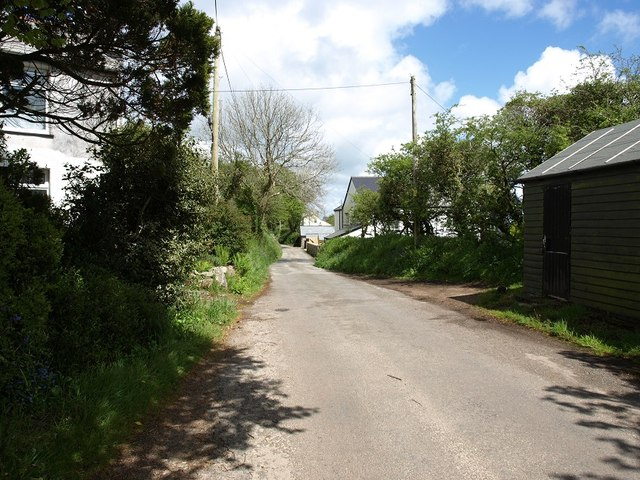
The road through Boslymon

Boslymon (Cornish: Bosseleven, meaning Dwelling of Seleven) is a hamlet in Cornwall, United Kingdom, three miles (5 km) south of Bodmin. It is in the civil parish of Lanlivery.
