= Lord Kirkcudbright =

Scottish peerage

Lordship of Kirkcudbright
- Creation date: 1633
- Created by: Charles I
- Peerage: Peerage of Scotland
- First holder: Sir Robert Maclellan of Bombie
- Last holder: Camden Gray McClellan, 9th Lord Kirkcudbright
- Status: Dormant
- Motto: Superba frango (Bring down the proud); Think on
- Arms: Or, two chevrons sable
- Crest: a naked cubit arm, supporting upon the point of a sword, erect, a moor's head, all ppr.
- Supporters: Dexter: a chevalier in complete armour, holding in his right hand a baton, all ppr.; Sinister: a horse argent furnished gules

Lord Kirkcudbright is a dormant title in the Peerage of Scotland. It was created for Sir Robert Maclellan of Bombie on a 1633 royal visit to Scotland by King Charles I. Maclellan had already been created a baronet of Nova Scotia in 1631.

This MacLellan surname is said to have derived from Mac-a-ghille-dhiolan (son of the bastard).

The MacLellan family was numerous in Galloway in the later half of the 14th Century and gave its name to Balmaclellan, MacLellan's town, in the Stewartry of Galloway. It is understood that the Balmaclellan lands were given to John MacLellan by James III, king of Scotland, in 1466 on John MacLellan's intention to provide a site for a church there abouts. By the beginning of the fifteenth century there were no fewer than fourteen knights of that name then living in Galloway.

Consequent upon, and sometime after the murder of Sir Patrick Maclellan by the 8th Earl of Douglas at his stronghold of Threave in 1452, family feuding without the King's authority led to the forfeiture of the Maclellan Barony of Bomby, along with other collateral estates. Not long afterwards however in 1455 some Bombie lands were recovered, when King James II, of Scotland, with support from the Maclellans, undertook the siege of Threave Castle, and won a victory over the 'Black Douglas' clan.

== Lords Kirkcudbright (1633–1832) ==
- Robert MacLellan, 1st Lord Kirkcudbright (1633–1639)
- Thomas MacLellan, 2nd Lord Kirkcudbright (1639–1647)
- John MacLellan, 3rd Lord Kirkcudbright (1647–1665)
- William MacLellan, 4th Lord Kirkcudbright (1665–1668)
- James MacLellan, 5th Lord Kirkcudbright (1721–1730)
- William MacLellan, 6th Lord Kirkcudbright (1734–1767)
- John MacLellan, 7th Lord Kirkcudbright (1767–1801)
- Sholto Henry MacLellan, 8th Lord Kirkcudbright (1801–1827)
- Camden Gray MacLellan, 9th Lord Kirkcudbright (1827–1832) (dormant)

== See also ==
- Kirkcudbrightshire
