= Boode =

Hamlet in Devon, England

Coordinates: 51.12°N 04.14°W

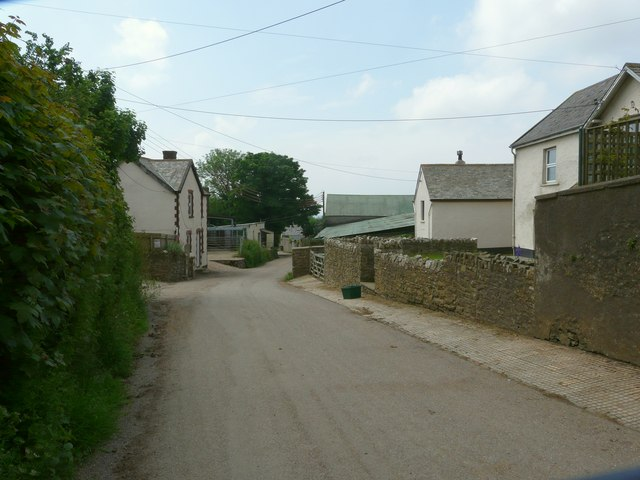
- Boode_Road,_Boode.

- Location within Devon
- OS grid reference: SS5038
- Civil parish: Braunton
- District: North Devon
- Shire county: Devon
- Region: South West
- Country: England
- Sovereign state: United Kingdom
- Police: Devon and Cornwall
- Fire: Devon and Somerset
- Ambulance: South Western

Boode is a small hamlet in North Devon, England. A large dairy farm is situated there. The farm won the Farmers Weekly 'Dairy Farmer of the Year' award 2011.
