= Bolberry =

Hamlet in Devon, England

Coordinates: 50.23°N 03.83°W

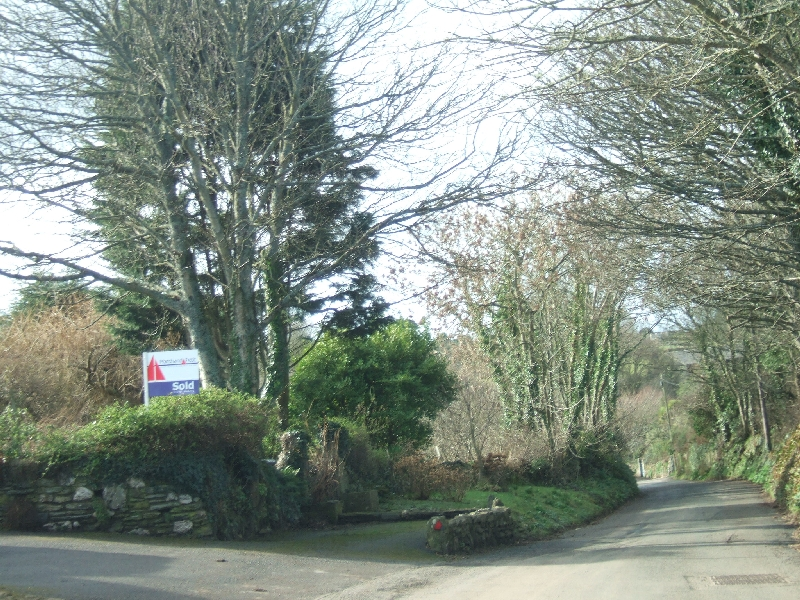
- The road into Bolberry

- Location within Devon
- OS grid reference: SX6939
- Shire county: Devon
- Region: South West
- Country: England
- Sovereign state: United Kingdom
- Police: Devon and Cornwall
- Fire: Devon and Somerset
- Ambulance: South Western

Bolberry is a hamlet on the south coast of Devon, England.

The village is mentioned in Domesday Book in 1066 and 1086, which shows the land was of little value at the time.

Along with Bolberry Down it falls within the South Devon Area of Outstanding Natural Beauty.

Bolberry Farmhouse dates from the 16th century, while Bolberry House Farm was built in the mid 19th century.
