= John MacLellan, 7th Lord Kirkcudbright =

Scottish peer (1729 –1801)

John MacLellan (10 January 1729 – 14 December 1801) was 7th Lord Kirkcudbright, from 1767 to 1801. He was the son of William MacLellan, 6th Lord Kirkcudbright, and Margaret Murray, born in Edinburgh Parish, Edinburgh, Scotland.

== Background ==
MacLellan was an officer in the 30th (Cambridgeshire) Regiment of Foot, in which he had the commission of ensign in 1756 and that of lieutenant in 1758. He had a company in the 30th regiment of foot in 1774 and exchanged it for a lieutenancy of the 3rd regiment of foot guards in 1776, in which regiment he had a company with the rank of lieutenant colonel in 1784 and retired from the service in 1789.

During the Seven Years War (1756–63), the 30th took part in the raids on Rochefort (1757), St Malo (1758) and Belleisle (1761) before moving to Gibraltar in 1763.

He was abroad at the time of his father's death, but in 1767 he presented a petition to the King, praying His Majesty to declare and establish his right and title to the honor of Lord Kirkcudbright. On 3 May 1772 the claim was admitted in the House of Lords, and at the next general election of Representative Peers his vote was duly recorded in the name of Lord Kirkcudbright.

A petition of John MacLellan, Esquire; a lieutenant in the 30th Regiment of Foot, claiming the title and honors of Lord Kirkcudbright [xxiii. 218. xxiv. 219.], was heard before the House of Lords, Palace of Westminster, London, England on 15 March 1773, and some days afterward; and, on 3 May the claim was sustained. – On the 15th of that month, John, Lord Kirkcudbright, had the honor to kiss His Majesty's hand, on having the honors of his ancestors confirmed to him by a decree of the House of Lords. His Lordship was introduced by the Earl of Oxford and accompanied to court by the Earl of Loudon.

MacLellan is sometimes referred to as the 8th Lord Kirkcudbright, a common misconception that arises due to the fact that in 1668, John McClellan of Auchlane, in the Parish of Kelton and the County of Kirkcudbrightshire, made a supplication as heir of the deceased William MacLellan, 4th Lord Kirkcudbright, as nephew of John MacLellan, 3rd Lord Kirkcudbright, but immediately renounced his right as heir because he was pursued by his father William MacLellan of Auchlane's creditors and lacked sufficient funds to pay off his debts. Nevertheless, he is occasionally referred to as a Lord Kirkcudbright, despite the fact that he never possessed the title.

MacLellan married Elizabeth Bannister at St James's Church, Piccadilly, London in 1768. They had four children: Amelia, Elizabeth, Sholto, and Camden.

MacLellan's regiment was garrisoned in Ireland during the early years of the American War of Independence (1775–83) with garrisons at Galway, Ballyshannon, Dublin, Youghal, Clonmel, Dungarvan, Cork, and Kinsale, but arrived in South Carolina in 1781, going on to fight in the campaign in the southern colonies.

In March 1781 the 3rd Buffs, 19th Foot, and the 30th embarked at Monkstown, County Cork, Ireland, for America, and reached Charleston on 3 June 1781, 68 days after starting. In 1782, the 30th regiment of foot became the county regiment of Cambridgeshire and moved to the West Indies, where it fought at St. Croix and Antigua (1782), St Lucia (1783) and Dominica (1788–91).

He died on 24 December 1801 at his residence on Hereford Street, South Kensington, London, and was succeeded by his eldest son, Sholto Henry MacLellan.
