= Boquio =

Hamlet in Cornwall, England

Coordinates: 50.155°N 5.257°W

- Location within the United Kingdom
- OS grid reference: SW6733
- Civil parish: Wendron
- Shire county: Cornwall
- Region: South West
- Police
- Fire
- Ambulance

Boquio is a small upland area south of Bolitho in west Cornwall, United Kingdom. It is situated approximately halfway between Praze-an-Beeble and Wendron in the civil parish of Wendron. There are several farmstead settlements bearing the names Boquio and Boquio Vean in the area.
