= Bocking's Elm =

Suburb of Clacton-on-Sea, Essex, England

Coordinates: 51.80°N 01.11°E

- Location within Essex
- Population: 4,549 (2011. Ward)
- OS grid reference: TM1516
- District: Tendring
- Shire county: Essex
- Region: East
- Country: England
- Sovereign state: United Kingdom
- Post town: Clacton-on-Sea
- Postcode district: CO16
- Police: Essex
- Fire: Essex
- Ambulance: East of England

Bocking's Elm is a suburb of Clacton-on-Sea, in the Tendring district of Essex, England.
