= Bogthorn =

Coordinates: 53.84°N 01.94°W

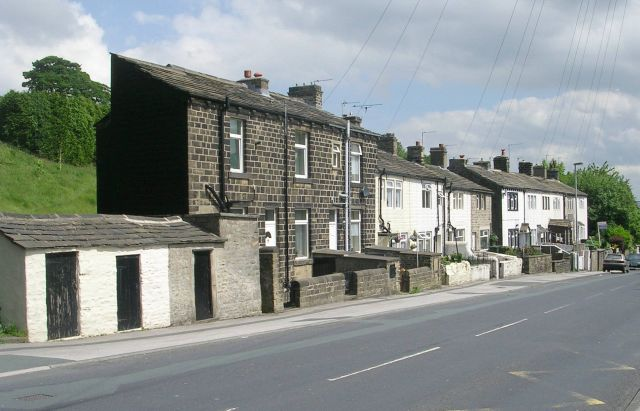
- Keighley Road through Bogthorn

- Location within West Yorkshire
- OS grid reference: SE0439
- Metropolitan county: West Yorkshire
- Region: Yorkshire and the Humber
- Country: England
- Sovereign state: United Kingdom
- Post town: KEIGHLEY
- Postcode district: BD22
- Dialling code: 01535
- Police: West Yorkshire
- Fire: West Yorkshire
- Ambulance: Yorkshire

Bogthorn is a hamlet which forms part of Keighley in the City of Bradford, West Yorkshire, England. It lies between Exley Head and Oakworth on Keighley Road which is part of the B6143 road. A Wesleyan chapel was built at the corner of Goose Cote Lane in 1882.
