= Borrowston, Lewis =

Coordinates: 58.281°N 6.793°W

Borrowston: Scottish Gaelic: Borghastan
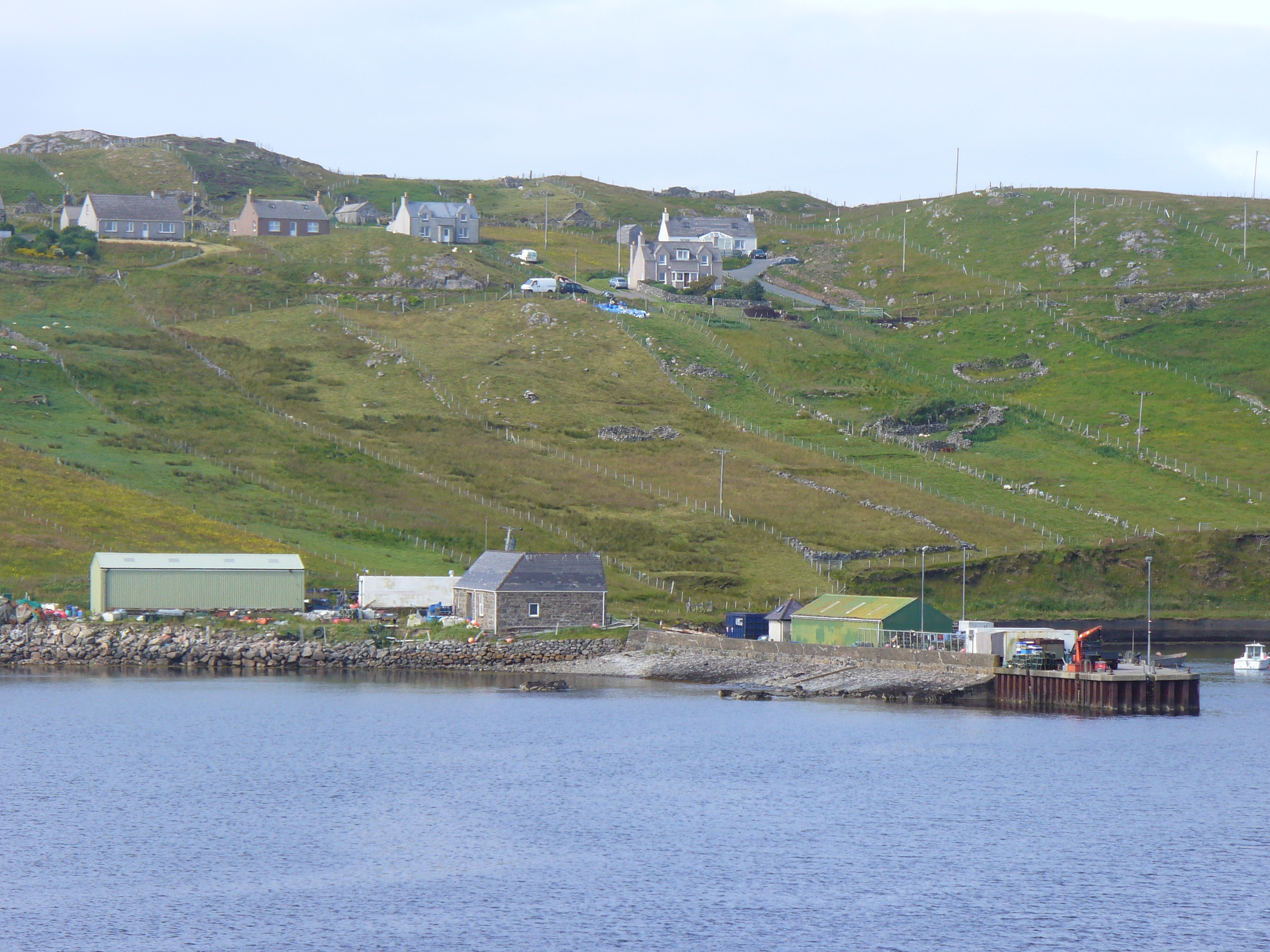
- Crofts, Borrowston

- Location within the Outer Hebrides
- Language: Scottish Gaelic; English
- OS grid reference: NB190424
- Civil parish: Uig
- Council area: Na h-Eileanan Siar
- Lieutenancy area: Western Isles
- Country: Scotland
- Sovereign state: United Kingdom
- Post town: ISLE OF LEWIS
- Postcode district: HS2
- Dialling code: 01851
- Police: Scotland
- Fire: Scottish
- Ambulance: Scottish
- UK Parliament: Na h-Eileanan an Iar
- Scottish Parliament: Na h-Eileanan an Iar

Borrowston (Scottish Gaelic: Borghastan), with a population of about 50, is a crofting township situated on the Isle of Lewis, on the Outer Hebrides of Scotland. It lies at the northern end of Loch Carloway 1/2 mile (800 metres) west of Carloway. Borrowston is within the parish of Uig, and is situated near to the A858, which runs through Carloway. The hill Ben Borriston (85 metres or 279 feet) lies to the west.
