= Bonnykelly =

Coordinates: 57.56°N 02.25°W

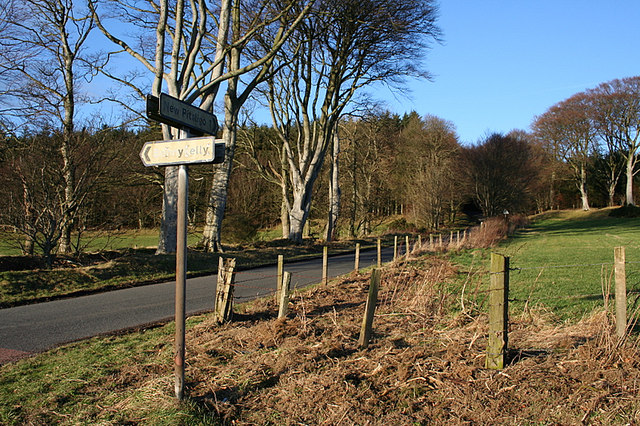
- Bonnykelly junction south of New Pitsligo

- Location within Aberdeenshire
- OS grid reference: NJ8553
- Council area: Aberdeenshire
- Lieutenancy area: Aberdeenshire
- Country: Scotland
- Sovereign state: United Kingdom
- Police: Scotland
- Fire: Scottish
- Ambulance: Scottish

Bonnykelly is a rural area to the west of the village of New Pitsligo in Aberdeenshire, Scotland.
