= Boothsdale =

Village in Cheshire, England

Coordinates: 53.19°N 02.70°W

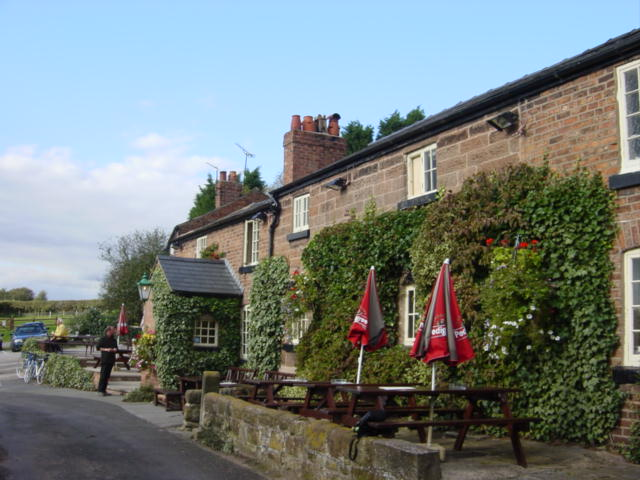
- The Boot Inn, a converted row of cottages

- Location within Cheshire
- OS grid reference: SJ5367
- Unitary authority: Cheshire West and Chester
- Ceremonial county: Cheshire
- Region: North West
- Country: England
- Sovereign state: United Kingdom
- Police: Cheshire
- Fire: Cheshire
- Ambulance: North West

Boothsdale is a village in Cheshire, England. It is part of the civil parish of Willington.
