= Boothen =

Area of Stoke-on-Trent, England

Coordinates: 52.995°N 2.190°W

- Location within Staffordshire
- Population: 5,744 (2011.Ward. Boothen and Oak Hill)
- OS grid reference: SJ8744
- Shire county: Staffordshire
- Region: West Midlands
- Country: England
- Sovereign state: United Kingdom
- Post town: Stoke-on-Trent
- Postcode district: ST4
- Police: Staffordshire
- Fire: Staffordshire
- Ambulance: West Midlands

Boothen is an area and electoral ward of Stoke-on-Trent, Staffordshire, England.
