= Robert Maclellan, 1st Lord Kirkcudbright =

Scottish Nobleman (c. 1592–1639)

Sir Robert MacLellan, born c. 1592 in Bombie, Kirkcudbright, Dumfries & Galloway, Scotland, was the son of Thomas MacLellan of Bombie and Grisel Maxwell. Robert was the 1st Lord Kirkcudbright, a title he held from 1633 to 1639. Since he was underage in 1597, at the time of his father’s death, his guardian and tutor during his formative years was Sir William MacLellan of Auchlane.

== Biography ==
As early as 1594, Robert received a charter for Balgreddan Farm and by 1603, MacLellan was knighted by James VI of Scotland and was appointed to serve as a Gentlemen of the Bedchamber, a position at court that provided him significant influence.

Robert married, first (contracted 18 and 26 October 1603), Agnes, the sixth daughter of Hugh, first Lord Loudoun; secondly, in 1614, Mary Montgomery, daughter of Hugh, 1st Viscount Montgomery of the Great Ards; she died before 1636, and he married, thirdly, Mary, daughter of Robert Gage of Raunds, Northamptonshire, widow, first, of John Rowley of Castleroe, County Londonderry, and secondly, of Sir George Trevelyan.

By 1607, MacLellan was already in a prominent public role, having been elected Provost of Kirkcudbright. His two terms as Provost (1606–1609 and 1611–1613) were marked by tumultuous and controversial actions. His first significant scandal occurred in July 1607 when, at a church session in Kirkcudbright, MacLellan assaulted Robert Glendinning, the minister, during a heated debate. This was part of an ongoing conflict with Robert Forrester, whose alleged adultery was being discussed at the session.

In another incident in August 1607, MacLellan, armed with pistols and other weapons, was accused of shooting at George Glendinning of Drumrash. This altercation led to a lengthy legal battle, where MacLellan was eventually ordered to pay compensation, but not before he retaliated with his own countercharges against the Glendinnings.

MacLellan's life was defined by numerous clashes, many of them rooted in family rivalries and feuds. In 1608, he was accused of holding a grudge against his uncle, William MacLellan of Auchlane, and was charged with plotting his relative's death. This tension was compounded by accusations that MacLellan had been lenient in allowing prisoners to remain free in Kirkcudbright, which further brought him before the Privy Council.

A series of legal troubles continued through 1608 and 1609, with accusations of assault, theft, and bloodshed. In April 1608, MacLellan's involvement in an affray in Kirkcudbright led to him being fined and imprisoned in Blackness Castle. The situation worsened when he and his clan members were accused of attacking several men, including William Maxwell of Cavers and merchant Edward Edzer, in the streets of Kirkcudbright. MacLellan was subsequently found liable for these actions and was subjected to further fines and imprisonment, though some charges were dropped.

Despite a series of scandals and his violent reputation, MacLellan was also a skilled landowner. In 1610, he obtained lands in Ulster as part of the Scottish Plantation in Ireland, acquiring estates such as the Rosses in County Donegal and Ballycastle in County Londonderry—an estate belonging to the Haberdashers' Company—as well as the Clothworkers' Estate.

MacLellan spent much of his time in Ireland, overseeing the leasing of his lands and occasionally returning to Scotland to manage his estates. However, his financial troubles deepened, as the costs of the plantation were higher than anticipated, and he faced mounting debts. His involvement in Irish affairs continued into the 1620s, when he was granted a commission to raise troops for service in Ireland, and he sought reimbursements for the expenses incurred during military campaigns.

By the early 1620s, MacLellan was member of Parliament for the county of Wigtown and was appointed one of the commissioners for the small barons. He was also one of the Commissioners to oversee the customers of Galloway. Though his financial problems only became more pronounced. He was involved in several legal disputes over land transactions and debts. In 1621, he was summoned to court over the non-payment of 700 merks and was further embroiled in a dispute over land sales with Robert MacLellan of Nunton. These financial struggles led to multiple mortgages on his estates and an increasing reliance on loans.

In 1622, MacLellan became involved in an assault on a messenger who had come to serve him with legal papers related to his debts. The altercation led to another public scandal, resulting in his imprisonment at Edinburgh Castle. Despite these troubles, he continued to hold public office, becoming a Justice of the Peace for Kirkcudbright & Wigtown and a Commissioner for the Middle Shires Borders.

In the years following his financial crisis, MacLellan’s role in public affairs gradually diminished, though he remained active in the pursuit of his rights. By 1629, he was created a Baronet of Nova Scotia. In 1633, by letters patent dated 26th May 1633, Maclellan’s prominence was cemented when he was granted the title of Lord Kirkcudbright by Charles I.

In the 1630s, MacLellan’s activities in Ireland took a more bureaucratic turn as he sought to enforce the maintenance of public infrastructure and force local landowners to fulfill their obligations. His efforts to recover money owed to him were often met with resistance, and his involvement in these matters continued into the early 1630s. His final years were spent negotiating with the Crown and local landowners, and by 1632, he had successfully brought a significant sum into the Treasury.

Sir Robert MacLellan of Bombie’s later years were marked by his persistent legal and financial troubles, but also by substantial contributions to the plantation efforts in Ireland and his role as a landowner. He died 18 January 1639.

Peerage of Scotland
| New creation | Lord Kirkcudbright; 1633–1641 | Succeeded by Thomas Maclellan |
Baronetage of Nova Scotia
| New creation | Baronet (of Bombie) c.1631–1641 | Succeeded by Thomas Maclellan |
