= Boswin =

Hamlet in Cornwall, England

Coordinates: 50.162°N 5.231°W

Boswin: Cornish: Boswenn
- Location within Cornwall
- OS grid reference: SW6934
- Shire county: Cornwall
- Region: South West
- Country: England
- Sovereign state: United Kingdom
- Post town: Helston
- Postcode district: TR13 0
- Police: Devon and Cornwall
- Fire: Cornwall
- Ambulance: South Western

Boswin (Cornish: Boswenn, meaning Dwelling of Gwenn) is a hamlet in Cornwall, England, United Kingdom, situated in a former mining area south of Redruth. According to the Post Office the population of the hamlet was included in the civil parish of Wendron
