= Boswyn =

Hamlet in Cornwall, England

Coordinates: 50.1842°N 5.2723°W

- Location within Cornwall
- OS grid reference: SW664369
- Shire county: Cornwall
- Region: South West
- Country: England
- Sovereign state: United Kingdom
- Post town: Camborne
- Postcode district: TR14
- Police: Devon and Cornwall
- Fire: Cornwall
- Ambulance: South Western

Boswyn is a hamlet in west Cornwall, England, United Kingdom, approximately one mile south of Troon. It is in the civil parish of Camborne.
