= Bocaddon =

Coordinates: 50.3944°N 4.5629°W

Bocaddon: Cornish: Boskadwen
- Location within Cornwall
- OS grid reference: SX181580
- Civil parish: Lanreath
- Shire county: Cornwall
- Region: South West
- Country: England
- Sovereign state: United Kingdom
- Post town: Looe
- Postcode district: PL13 2
- Police: Devon and Cornwall
- Fire: Cornwall
- Ambulance: South Western

Bocaddon (Cornish: Boskadwen, meaning Dwelling of Kadwen) is a hamlet in Cornwall, UK. It is in the civil parish of Lanreath and is half-a-mile north of Lanreath village, six miles (10 km) south-west of Liskeard.
