= Sir Samuel McClellan =

Scottish cloth merchant and politician

Sir Samuel McClellan, MacClellan or McLellan (c. 1640–1709) was a Scottish cloth merchant and politician who sat in the House of Commons of Great Britain from 1708 to 1709. He served as Lord Provost of Edinburgh from 1706 to 1708.

== Early life ==
McClellan was descended from the McClellans of Raeberry Castle near Bomby in Kirkcudbright. He was the eldest son of Rev Patrick McClellan (died 1666) of Girthon near Kirkcudbright and his wife Jean Primrose. He was apprenticed to Robert Douglas, an Edinburgh merchant, and after Douglas died in 1679, he was admitted as a burgess of Edinburgh in his own right. MacClellan retained some interest during the 1670s in property in the stewartry (in 1676 he is recorded as owner of the Tannifad and Whinniehill farm estates) but he focused his attention on Edinburgh. In 1681, he invested £100 in the new cloth manufactory at the Newmills Cloth Manufactory at Amisfield Haddington, east of Edinburgh. With an employment force of 700, it was one of the largest factories in all Scotland. He and his partners secured a series of important contracts for military uniforms. In 1690 he received a lucrative contract for 647 military red coats from Alexander Gordon, Viscount Kenmure, replacing uniforms damaged in the Battle of Killiecrankie.

== Career ==
McLellan was treasurer to Kirk sessions at Edinburgh in 1690, and a merchant councillor from 1692 to 1693. He was baron bailie for Leith in 1693 and old bailie in 1695. By 1694, he married Marjorie Thomson. From 1696 to 1698, he was treasurer for the city. In 1696 he bought shares in the ill-fated Company of Scotland, also buying £3000 on behalf of the City of Edinburgh probably in his capacity as City Treasurer. However, despite investment he was not an official company member.

In 1697 McLellan took over the stewart and justiciar, Orkney and Shetland, Stewartry of Orkney, supplying goods to the island, and ensuring such supply from others. In 1702, he was old dean of guild and became a magistrate in 1704. He was dean of guild in 1705 and in 1706 was elected Lord Provost of Edinburgh in succession to Sir Patrick Johnston at Michaelmas 1706. Johnston rather than McClellan was the broker of the Act of Union 1707, but McClellan, as a major investor in the Company of Scotland, received compensation for his losses in the company under the terms of agreement of the Act of Union.

McLellan was burgess of Perth in 1708, and at the 1708 British general election, was returned as Member of Parliament for Edinburgh. He was given a detailed set of instructions from his constituents and was voted £300 for expenses in London. The convention of royal burghs also promised him £100 to promote their interests. At Michaelmas 1708, he was succeeded as Lord Provost by Johnston, who returned to office after a period of self-imposed exile. His record in Parliament does show much activity, and he did not meet any of his constituent's objectives, but he claimed an additional sum of £106 7s. 2d in expenses. He also looked after his own interests while in London. He gave financial inducements to Robert Walpole and Sir David Dalrymple, 1st Baronet, to secure Scottish forage contracts.

== Death and legacy ==
McLellan died on 22 September 1709 leaving three sons and four daughters. He was succeeded by his eldest son, James, who subsequently made an abortive bid for the barony of Kirkcudbright, claiming to be the nearest male heir to a peerage that had failed in its main line. He was father of P. MacLellan (Patrick?), who is noted as a donor to the Orphan Hospital in 1770. and was grandfather to William McClellan, 6th Lord Kirkcudbright.

His deals for forage contracts were censured in the report of the public accounts commissioners on 21 December 1711. The New Mills factory was auctioned in 1712 following his death.

His brother Robert McClellan of Barmachagan fought at the Battle of Rullion Green in 1666. After several years in hiding he returned as a Captain fighting at the Battle of Drumclog and Battle of Bothwell Brig. He was banished from Scotland in 1685 and sent (as a punishment) to New Jersey. Robert's son (Samuel's nephew) also Robert (died 1717) became a tobacco merchant trading between America and Glasgow.

Parliament of Great Britain
New constituency	Member of Parliament for Edinburgh; 1708–1709	Succeeded by Sir Patrick Johnston
