= Bondend =

Coordinates: 51.83°N 02.20°W

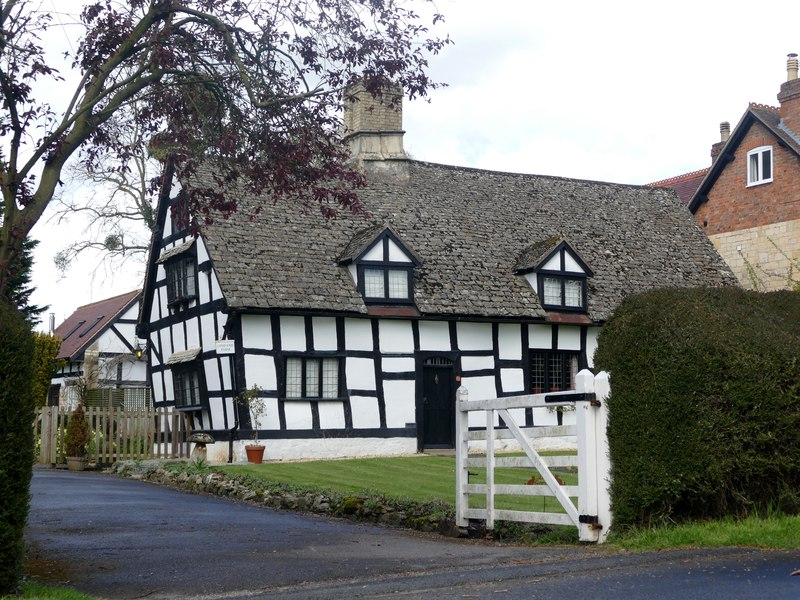
- Bondend Farm

- Location within Gloucestershire
- OS grid reference: SO8615
- District: Stroud
- Shire county: Gloucestershire
- Region: South West
- Country: England
- Sovereign state: United Kingdom
- Police: Gloucestershire
- Fire: Gloucestershire
- Ambulance: South Western

Bondend is a lane within the town of Upton St Leonards in Gloucestershire, England. Several buildings on Bondend are formally listed as historic buildings, including a late-16th century 'Black and White House',, Bondend Farmhouse and Commelines Mill.
