= Ramshaw, Consett =

Village in County Durham, England

Coordinates: 54.821°N 2.078°W

Ramshaw
- Location within County Durham
- OS grid reference: NY950473
- Unitary authority: County Durham
- Ceremonial county: County Durham
- Region: North East
- Country: England
- Sovereign state: United Kingdom
- Post town: Durham
- Postcode district: DH8
- Police: Durham
- Fire: County Durham and Darlington
- Ambulance: North East

Ramshaw is a small village in County Durham, in England. It is situated to the south of Hunstanworth, a few miles west of Consett.

Lead mining was an important industry from the 1650s. The London Lead Company operated in the area from the 1700s to the 1850s when the Derwent Mining Company took over. By the 1950s mining had ceased. The mine workings area is a scheduled monument.

The house of the mine's manager still exists, and was built in the 1840s.

There have been 2 crime incidents reported in January 2025.
