= Bofarnel =

Coordinates: 50.4379°N 4.6655°W

- Location within Cornwall
- OS grid reference: SX108632
- Civil parish: St Winnow
- Unitary authority: Cornwall
- Ceremonial county: Cornwall
- Region: South West
- Country: England
- Sovereign state: United Kingdom
- Post town: LOSTWITHIEL
- Postcode district: PL22
- Dialling code: 01208
- Police: Devon and Cornwall
- Fire: Cornwall
- Ambulance: South Western
- UK Parliament: South East Cornwall

Bofarnel is a hamlet in Cornwall, England, in the United Kingdom. It lies within the civil parish of St Winnow, 6 miles (6.4 km) southeast of Bodmin and 2.5 miles (4 km) north of Lostwithiel. Bodmin Parkway railway station is 1 km to the north of the hamlet.
