= Bolton Green =

Village in Lancashire, England

Coordinates: 53.653°N 2.675°W

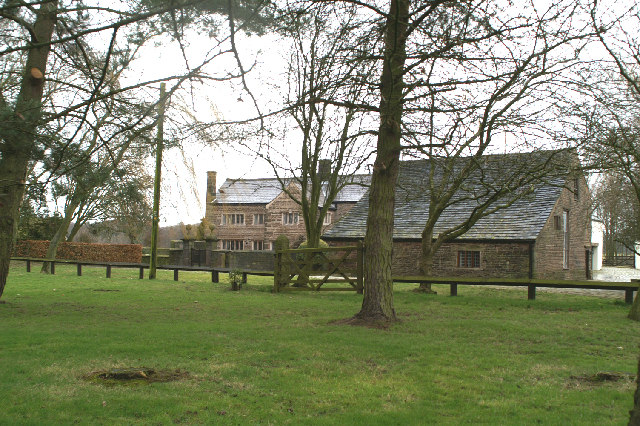
- Bolton Green Hall

- Shown within Chorley Borough Location within Lancashire
- OS grid reference: SD553176
- Civil parish: Charnock Richard
- District: Chorley
- Shire county: Lancashire
- Region: North West
- Country: England
- Sovereign state: United Kingdom
- Post town: CHORLEY
- Postcode district: PR7
- Dialling code: 01257
- Police: Lancashire
- Fire: Lancashire
- Ambulance: North West
- UK Parliament: Chorley

Bolton Green is a village in the Borough of Chorley, Lancashire, England.

Bolton Green Hall farmhouse is a Grade II* listed building dating from 1612.
