= Boasley Cross =

Village in Devon, England

Coordinates: 50.71°N 04.12°W

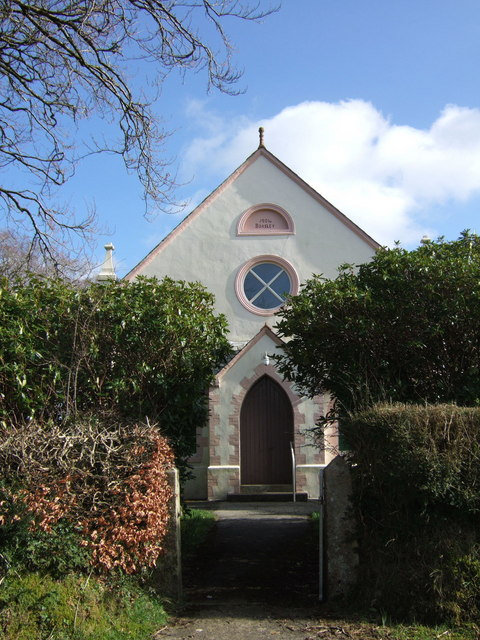
- Boasley Cross Methodist chapel

- Location within Devon
- OS grid reference: SX5093
- Shire county: Devon
- Region: South West
- Country: England
- Sovereign state: United Kingdom
- Police: Devon and Cornwall
- Fire: Devon and Somerset
- Ambulance: South Western

Boasley Cross is a village in Devon, England. It is home to the small Boasley Cross Primary School and Boasley Cross Chapel.
