= Bohortha =

Village in Cornwall, England

Coordinates: 50.1519°N 4.9949°W

Bohortha: Cornish: Buorthow
- Location within Cornwall
- OS grid reference: SW8632
- Civil parish: Gerrans
- Shire county: Cornwall
- Region: South West
- Country: England
- Sovereign state: United Kingdom
- Post town: Truro
- Postcode district: TR2
- Police: Devon and Cornwall
- Fire: Cornwall
- Ambulance: South Western

Bohortha (Cornish: Buorthow) is a coastal village in south Cornwall, England, United Kingdom. It is situated on the east side of the Roseland Peninsula two miles south of Portscatho. It is in the civil parish of Gerrans.

Bohortha lies within the Cornwall Area of Outstanding Natural Beauty (AONB).

The name of the village comes from the Cornish language word buorthow which means "cattle yards".

== History ==
It was formerly known as "St. Anthony" village but has become known as Bohortha after one of the farmsteads that existed there up until the 1970s, the others being Manor Farm and Bohurrow Farm, both of which, as Bohortha, are represented by farmhouses within the village. All 3 plus Porth Farm near Towan Beach and Place Barton above the nearby Place Manor are now combined and farmed as one.

There once existed an alehouse or hotel named "The Pig & Whistle" some centuries ago. "The Old School House" down the road was the primary school for the children in & around St. Anthony's Head up until the first few decades of the 20th century.
