= Boddin, Angus =

Coordinates: 56.674163°N 2.473223°W

Boddin
- Location within Angus
- OS grid reference: NO711537
- Council area: Angus
- Lieutenancy area: Angus
- Country: Scotland
- Sovereign state: United Kingdom
- Police: Scotland
- Fire: Scottish
- Ambulance: Scottish
- UK Parliament: Angus
- Scottish Parliament: Angus North and Mearns

Boddin is a coastal village in Angus, Scotland, two miles south of Montrose.

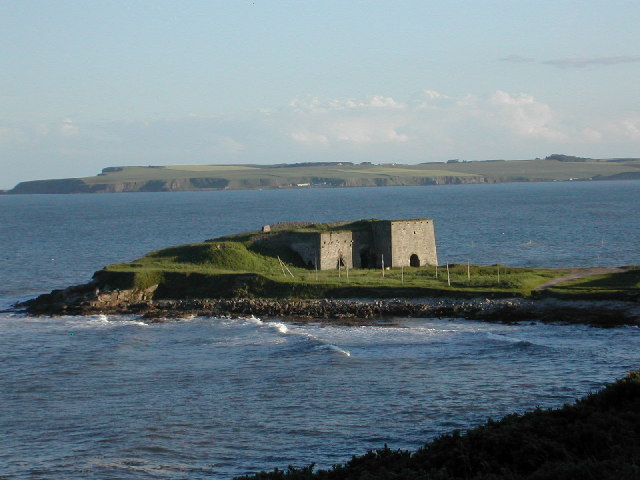
Lime kilns at Boddin Point

There are lime kilns at Boddin Point.
