= Hugh Blair of Borgue =

Scottish nobleman

Hugh Blair (1708–1765) was a Scottish laird from Borgue, Kirkcudbrightshire, who was nicknamed "the daft lad of Borgue" due to his many eccentricities. Modern writers have speculated that records of Hugh Blair might be consistent with a modern diagnosis of autism spectrum disorder. He was generally well liked by people who knew him.

More recent scholarship has re-evaluated Hugh Blair from within the neurodiversity paradigm.

== Biography ==
Hugh was the oldest son of David Blair and Grizell Blair. Hugh had three siblings: a young brother John and two sisters. Hugh's father had died in 1716.

In 1737, Hugh's younger brother John became his legal guardian ('curator'). In 1746, Blair married a surgeon's daughter named Nickie Mitchell. In 1748, his brother (and guardian) John successfully sought to have the marriage annulled by the Commissary Court of Edinburgh. It is uncertain whether Hugh ever knew he was married or not, as whenever he was asked if he would like to marry someone he would reply "yes" regardless of their gender or whether he even knew them or not. He answered "yes" when asked this question by a male commissary in the courtroom. He was also given a questionnaire by the court to test his competency, but he simply rewrote the questions rather than answering them.

Hugh was alleged to have engaged in a number of unusual behaviours including:

- Collecting bird feathers, twigs and pieces of cloth.
- Always wearing the same piece of clothing which he repaired by sewing patches of new cloth stolen from other people without their knowledge
- Requesting the same seat in church and engaging in repetitive acts.
- Compulsively keeping objects in the same order.
- Attending every nearby burial, regardless of whether he knew the deceased.
- Making unannounced visits to others and being oblivious to social cues. For example, he copied greetings but never initiated them.
- Socialized with servants who insulted him and played pranks on him, unaware he was the object of their ridicule.
- While most considered him feeble-minded, some were impressed with his long term memory.
- Ate his meals alone and would allow his pet cat to eat off of his plate.
- Compulsively washed his wig so that he could see the water drops falling from it.
- Repetitively carried rocks and pieces of wood from one place to another for no reason.
- After watching some workers, he acquired a great interest in dry stone dykes despite not knowing their use. He built one on his own estate that went nowhere and served no purpose.
- Was socially innocent and would strip naked if asked to do so, even if he were in public.
- Slept alone in a freezing garret in a bug-ridden bed, filled with twigs and old feathers.
- Preferred the company of animals to other people.
