= Borness =

Coordinates: 54.78°N 04.16°W

- Location within Dumfries and Galloway
- OS grid reference: NX6145
- Council area: Dumfries and Galloway
- Country: Scotland
- Sovereign state: United Kingdom
- Police: Scotland
- Fire: Scottish
- Ambulance: Scottish

Borness is a farm of around 1550 acres on the coast of Borgue Parish in the Stewartry of Kirkcudbrightshire (now part of Dumfries and Galloway). It is probably more of a 'fermtoun' in that several cottages are present on the farm. In the 1881 Census for Borgue, Borness supported a farmhouse with farmer, wife, 4 children, 3 female and 3 male servants, with 3 cottages (cothouses), each with a family living there. The cottars all laboured on the farm. The farmer employed in total 14 men, 6 women and 2 boys. Borness sits above the heughs (cliffs) with an outlook across Wigtown Bay and the western portion of the Solway Firth.
