= Borgue, Dumfries and Galloway =

Coordinates: 54.812°N 4.134°W

Borgue
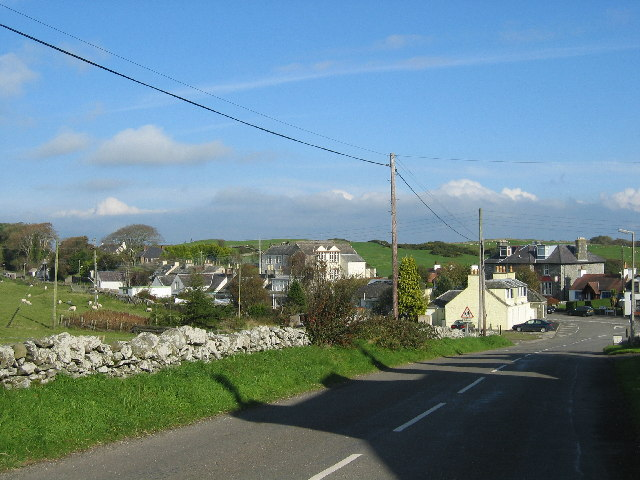
- Borgue Village

- Location within Dumfries and Galloway
- OS grid reference: NX629484
- Council area: Dumfries and Galloway
- Lieutenancy area: Kirkcudbrightshire
- Country: Scotland
- Sovereign state: United Kingdom
- Post town: KIRKCUDBRIGHT
- Postcode district: DG6
- Dialling code: 01557
- Police: Scotland
- Fire: Scottish
- Ambulance: Scottish
- UK Parliament: Dumfries and Galloway
- Scottish Parliament: Galloway and West Dumfries

Borgue (pronounced /ˈbɔrɡ/; Scottish Gaelic: Borgh) is a village and parish in the Stewartry of Kirkcudbright in Dumfries and Galloway, Scotland. It lies 5 miles south-west of Kirkcudbright and 6 miles south of Gatehouse of Fleet. The name Borgue (recorded as Borg in 1469) is from Old Norse borg 'stronghold'.

Borgue Parish Church was built in 1814 and designed by architect Walter Newall with alterations dating from 1897 to 1898. Due to a dwindling congregation it closed in August 2018. The churchyard contains the late C19 Gothic mausoleum of the Gordons of Earlston.

According to folk tradition, Borgue was once the home of a boy who could consort with the fairies.

== Castle Haven dun ==
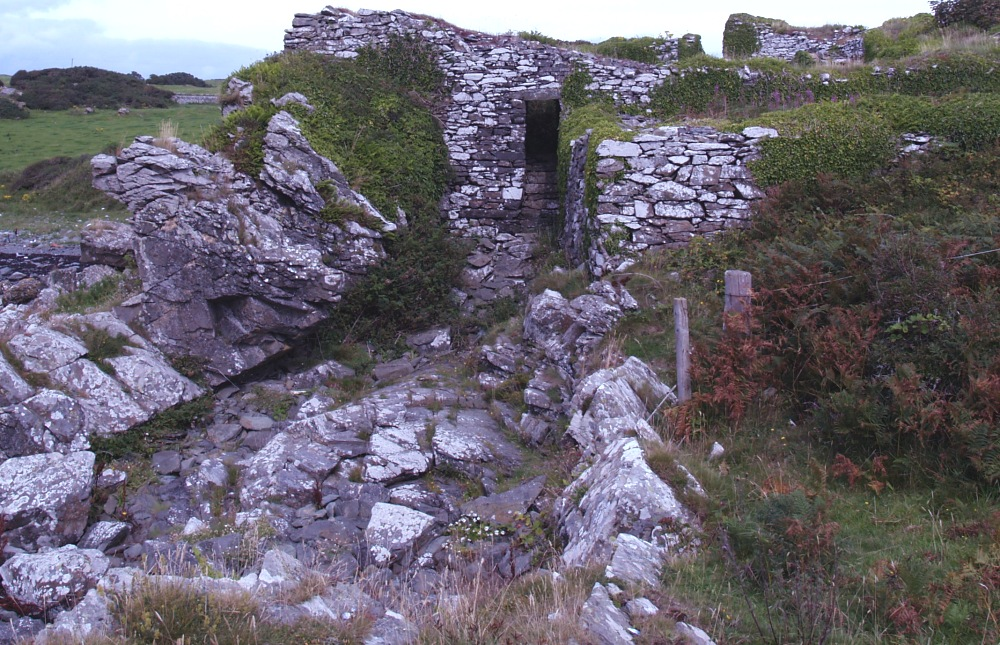
Castle Haven

Within the parish, near Kirkandrews, and due west of the village of Borgue, is Castle Haven, an Iron Age hill fort of uncertain date which is designated a scheduled monument.

Only about 10.5m x 18m in size, Castle Haven is of an unusual D-shape with an almost straight west wall running along the edge of a cliff. The fort is now overgrown and difficult to discern in the landscape, but a nearly concentric outer wall remains; the main entrance is in the arch segment to the north, while a smaller access at the south end leads down to the beach. Another peculiar characteristic of this fort is the almost totally hollow construction of the wall, which contains three galleries of different lengths within its thickness; six adits lead to the galleries. Steps lead to the top of the wall.

Artefacts found during restoration - two spiral bronze finger rings and a blue and white glass bead - indicate that its users were relatively prosperous. There were also fragments of an enamelled medieval brooch.

Designations

Scheduled monument
- Official name: Castle Haven dun
- Type: Prehistoric domestic and defensive: dun
- Designated: 6 February 1928
- Reference no.: SM1116

== Notable people from Borgue ==
- Hugh Blair of Borgue, eccentric 18th century laird
- George Cook, Moderator of the General Assembly of the Church of Scotland in 1876, minister of Borgue 1867 to 1888
- Henry Dalziel, 1st Baron Dalziel of Kirkcaldy (1868–1935), newspaper proprietor and MP
- Robin Gray (1931–2022), Speaker of the New Zealand House of Representatives from 1990 to 1993, born in Borgue
- Sheila Lavelle (1939-2001), children's novelist, moved to Borgue in 1989
- William Nicholson, poet, the "Bard of Galloway"
- John James Pringle (1855–1922), dermatologist
- Samuel Smith (1836–1906), Liberal politician
- Randolph Stewart, 13th Earl of Galloway (1928–2020), Scottish nobleman and the 13th Earl of Galloway

== List of listed buildings in Borgue ==
List of listed buildings in Borgue, Dumfries and Galloway
