= MacLellan (surname) =

MacLellan, McLellan, or variants thereof, is a surname of Scottish origin, some of whom emigrated to Ireland. The name is an Anglicisation of the Scottish Gaelic Mac Gille Fhaolain (IPA: ˈmaʰkˈkʲiʎəˈɯːɫ̪ɪn), and the Irish Gaelic Mac Giolla Fhaoláin (IPA: ˈmˠakˈɟɪl̪ˠəˈiːl̪ˠaːnʲ), which meant "son of the servant of (Saint) Faolán". The personal name, Faolán, is thought to be a diminutive of faol, meaning "wolf" or "little wolf".

- Abigail McLellan (1969–2009), Scottish artist
- Adam McLellan (1865–1929), Australian politician
- Alan McLellan (born 1958), English cricketer
- Alasdair McLellan (born 1974), British photographer
- Alban MacLellan (1902–1968), Canadian railway foreman and politician from Alberta, Canada
- Alister McLellan (1919–2012), New Zealand mathematician and physicist
- Ally McLellan (1922–2010), Scottish footballer
- Angus MacLellan (born 1992), American rugby union player
- Anne McLellan (born 1950), Deputy Prime Minister of Canada under Paul Martin
- Andrew McLellan, Scots minister of religion and chairman of the McLellan Commission into safeguarding the Scottish Catholic Church
- Archibald McLelan (1824–1890), sixth Lieutenant Governor of Nova Scotia
- Archibald McLellan (1795–1854), Glasgow coachbuilder, magistrate, councillor, Deacon Convenor of the Glasgow Trades House, and art collector
- Bernard Donald McLellan (1859–1907), Canadian farmer and political figure in Prince Edward Island
- Brian MacLellan (born 1958), Canadian, professional ice hockey player
- Catherine MacLellan, Canadian folk singer-songwriter
- Charles Archibald MacLellan (1885–1961), 20th-century American painter and illustrator
- Daniel McLellan (born 1974), Australian surf swimmer and life saving competitor
- Dave McLellan, automotive engineer for General Motors
- David McLellan (Ontario politician) (1841–1892), mayor of Hamilton, Ontario, Canada
- David McLellan (political scientist) (born 1940), political scientist
- Eric McLellan (1916–2010), Archdeacon of Northern France
- Garreth McLellan (born 1982), Former South African professional mixed martial artist
- Gene MacLellan (1938–1995), Canadian, singer-songwriter
- Geoff MacLellan (born 1978), Canadian politician
- George B. McClellan (1826–1885), American Civil War military leader, presidential candidate and Governor of New Jersey
- Gerald McLellan (1932–2009), Canadian ombudsman
- Hugh Dean McLellan (1876–1953), United States District Judge
- Isaac McLellan (1806–1899), American author and poet
- James MacLellan Brown (1886–1967), Scottish architect
- Jennifer McClellan (born 1972), Virginia politician
- Joasaph (McLellan) (1962–2009), US scholar and cleric, head of the ROCOR Russian Ecclesiastical Mission in Jerusalem
- Jock McLellan (1908–1974), New Zealand cricket umpire
- John M'Clellan (1609–1650) Scots Worthy, Presbyterian minister in who attempted to sail to America
- John Maclellan, 3rd Lord Kirkcudbright (died 1664), Scottish, baronet
- Jon MacLellan, computer game editor
- Joseph McLellan (1929–2005), music critic for The Washington Post
- Keith MacLellan (1920–1997), Canadian Diplomat
- Keith McLellan (born 1929), Australian long jump and triple jump athlete and rugby league footballer
- Morag McLellan (born 1990), Scottish field hockey player
- Neil McLellan, producer, composer and mix engineer
- Patrick Maclellan of Bombie (died 1452), Scottish, Sheriff of Galloway
- Peter McLellan (1942–1999), Australian politician
- Richard D. McLellan, American lawyer
- Rob Maclellan (born 1934), Australian politician
- Robert Maclellan, 1st Lord Kirkcudbright (died 1641), Scottish, baronet
- Robert McLellan (1907–1985), Scots dramatist and poet
- Robert A. MacLellan (1882–1968), Canadian politician
- Robert F. McLellan (1914–1988), Canadian politician
- Roberto McLellan (born 1984), Canadian professional boxer
- Russell MacLellan (born 1940), Canadian, politician and Premier of Nova Scotia
- Sally McLellan (born 1986), Australian track and field athlete
- Sandra McLellan (born 1961), Irish Sinn Féin TD
- Sarah McLellan (born 1982), Australian dancer, singer and actress
- Scott McLellan (born 1963), professional ice hockey player
- Silas McLellan (1897–1974), Canadian marathon runner
- Thomas Maclellan, 2nd Lord Kirkcudbright (died 1647), Scottish, baronet
- Thomas Maclellan of Bombie (died 1597), Scottish, Provost of Kirkcudbright
- Todd McLellan (born 1967), Canadian ice hockey player and head coach of the San Jose Sharks
- William Maclellan (knight), 15th-century Scottish noble
- William McLellan (American electrical engineer) (1928–2011), American electrical engineer
- William McLellan (Australian politician) (1831–1906), Australian politician
- William McLellan (Scottish electrical engineer) (1874–1934), Scottish electrical engineer
- William Walker McLellan (1873–1960), manager of the first S. H. Kress store in Memphis, Tennessee
- Yvette McLellan, Australian Paralympic athletics competitor
- Zoe McLellan (born 1974), American actress

== See also ==
- Clan MacLellan
- MacLellan (disambiguation)
- David McLellan (disambiguation)
- Thomas Maclellan (disambiguation)
- William McLellan (disambiguation)

== See also ==
- MacLelan
