= MacLellan =

MacLellan or McLellan may refer to:

== People ==
- MacLellan (surname)
- Clan MacLellan

== Places ==
- McLellan Galleries, exhibition space in the city of Glasgow, Scotland
- McLellan Stores, twentieth century chain of five and dime stores in the United States
- MacLellan's Castle, located in Kirkcudbright, Scotland
- McLellan, Florida, unincorporated community, United States

== See also ==
- McLelan
- McClellan (disambiguation)
- McClelland, a surname
