= Bombie =

Bombie may refer to:

== Chiefs of Clan Maclellan ==
Any of a number of chiefs of Clan MacLellan:

- Thomas Maclellan of Bombie
- Patrick Maclellan of Bombie

== Other ==
- Bombie the Zombie, a fictional character in the Scrooge McDuck universe
- Mother Bombie, the main character in the Elizabethan era stage play of the same name
- Bomblets, another term for submunitions in cluster weapons.

== See also ==
- Bomby
