= History of Sarasota, Florida =

The earliest known identification of the area known today as Sarasota, Florida, was identified on a sheepskin Spanish map from 1763 with the word "Zarazote" written over the location of present-day Sarasota and Bradenton. A 1776 British map by Bernard Romans lists a "Boca Sarasota" in the local area.

The municipal government of Sarasota was established when it was incorporated as a town in 1902. Incorporation under the city form of government followed in the next decade. In 1921, Sarasota County was formed out of Manatee County, with Sarasota city serving as the county seat.

== Early history ==
=== Prehistory ===
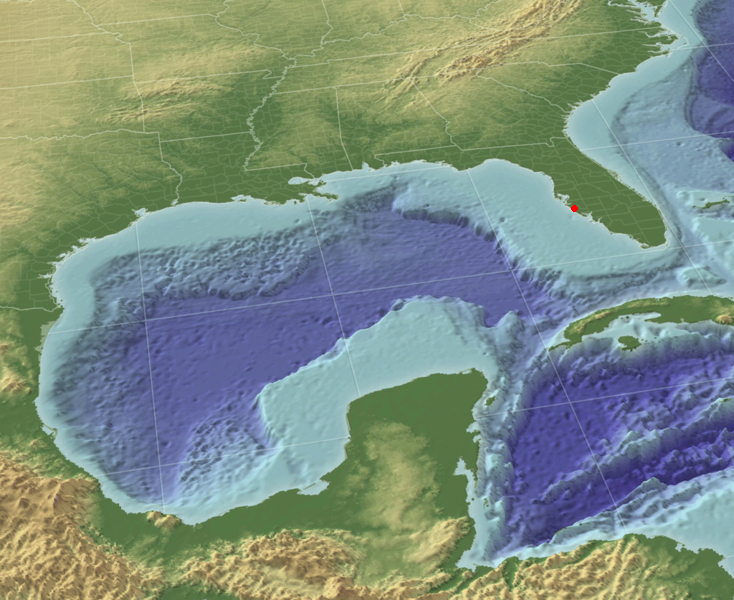
Gulf of Mexico in 3-D - note the shallow shelf extending one hundred miles to the west of Sarasota (red dot)

Fifteen thousand years ago, when humans first settled in Florida, the shoreline of the Gulf of Mexico was one hundred miles farther to the west. In this era, hunting and gathering was the primary means of subsistence. This was only possible in areas where water sources existed for hunter and prey alike. Deep springs and catchment basins, such as Warm Mineral Springs, were close enough to the Sarasota area to provide campsites, but too far away for permanent settlements.

As the Pleistocene glaciers slowly melted, a more temperate climate began to advance northward. Sea levels began rising; they ultimately rose another 350 feet (110 m), resulting in the Florida shoreline of today, which provided attractive locations for human settlements.

Archaeological research in Sarasota documents more than ten thousand years of seasonal occupation by native peoples. For five thousand years while the current sea level existed, fishing in Sarasota Bay was the primary source of protein and large mounds (middens) of discarded shells and fish bones attest to the prehistoric human settlements that existed in Sarasota and were sustained by the bounty of its bay.

People living in the area of the present boundaries of Sarasota were part of the Manasota culture, an archaeological culture that existed in the area from Pasco County to Sarasota County from about 500 B.C. until about 900. The Safety Harbor culture, which developed out of the Manasota culture around 900, covered much of the same area. Safety Harbor sites continued to be occupied after the Spanish reached Florida, as European artifacts have been found in the sites. Safety Harbor people built temple mounds in the primary towns of their chiefdoms. About twenty temple mound sites are known, including the Whitaker Mound that used to stand near Sarasota Bay in what is now downtown Sarasota, "Mound Street" being named for it. The Whitaker Mound, and a number of other mounds in what is now Sarasota, were destroyed in the twentieth century to make room for development. The "Whitaker Mound' is named for early area settler William Whitaker.

==== Spanish exploration ====
Europeans first explored the area in the early sixteenth century. The first recorded contact was in 1513, when a Spanish expedition^{[Ponce de Leon?]} landed at Charlotte Harbor, just to the south. Spanish was used by the natives during some of the initial encounters, however, providing evidence of earlier contacts.

In 1539, Spanish Conquistador Hernando de Soto sailed into southern Tampa Bay landing near the mouth of the Manatee River at Shaw's Point which is now part of the De Soto National Memorial. On early maps, the smaller bay along the coast to the south and the areas of contemporary Bradenton and Sarasota were identified as Zara Zota, Zara Sota, Sarazota, or Sarasota on maps.

==== European settlement ====
Sarasota Bay was known to be a prolific fishery as described by early area settlers. During the second Spanish Colonial period (1783–1821) there were fishing camps, called ranchos, along the bay that were established by Spanish fisherman from Cuba who traded fish and turtles with merchants in Havana.

Following the Adams–Onís Treaty, there were several claimants to Spanish land grants in and around Sarasota Bay, which were subsequently rejected by the United States.

After the conclusion of the War of 1812, some of the British Corps of Colonial Marines stationed at Prospect Bluff retreated to the Tampa Bay area. At least some of them established a farming community on Sarasota Bay. Subsequently, with the destruction of the Negro Fort and after the battles of First Seminole War, many maroons and Red Stick Creek Indians moved into the region.

With the Treaty of Moultrie Creek in 1823, most of the remaining Native Americans who had lived in the area were pushed to a reservation in the interior of Florida.

==== Fort Armistead ====
In May 1840, Brigadier General Walker Keith Armistead established Fort Armistead in Sarasota along the bay during the Second Seminole War. Fort Armistead was established because Armistead wanted to move against Native American settlements to the south of Fort Brooke. The fort is thought to have been located in the Indian Beach area of north Sarasota. It was short-lived and only existed for seven months. ^{[broken link]} The army established the fort at a rancho operated by Louis Pacheco, an African slave working for his Cuban-American owner Antonio Pacheco. Shortly before the fort was abandoned because of severe epidemics, the leaders of the Seminole and Miccosukee peoples gathered to discuss their impending removal to the Indian Territory, in accordance with the Treaty of Payne's Landing.

Following the closing of the Second Seminole War in 1842 many American settlers took advantage of the new Armed Occupation Act to secure land in the Florida Territory. Soon after Florida was admitted as the 27th state in 1845 and nearly ten years later the influx of new residents into the region helped ignite the Third Seminole War.

=== The American Civil War and Reconstruction ===
In 1860, Sarasota was still a part of Manatee county. While the county results of the vote to secede have been lost, or otherwise yet undiscovered, some scholars have deduced that the residents of Manatee were not overly enthusiastic about disunion. There were 20 slave owners reported in Manatee county in 1860. All the same, the county did begin raising a militia unit in that same year, in anticipation of secession. Over a hundred men from the county would end up serving, with some recruited to the 7th Florida Infantry Regiment, which fought as part of the Army of Tennessee.

Union parties would occasionally raid in the Sarasota area. These raids were meant to sap the locals' willingness to continue supporting the Confederate cause as well as deprive the southern armies of potential supplies. A.K. Whitaker, grandson of Sarasota settler William Whitaker, kept most of his cattle in the eastern section of the county, farther from Sarasota Bay, in an effort to keep them safe from Union raiders. Besides going after Florida cattle, Union raiders also destroyed many salt works along the Gulf Coast. However, the Whitaker's operation was not destroyed.

During the Union occupation in Florida, A.K. Whitaker's wife Mary is said to have given a Union soldier a block of matches saying, "Sir, I want to look into the eyes of a man who can stoop so low as to burn the home of a helpless woman and her family." Their house was not burned but others in the Manatee region were.

== People profiles ==
There were several individuals and families who helped develop Sarasota, including the following.

Historical marker dedicated to Mary Jane Wyatt Whitaker near her pioneer residence and tomb

Whitaker - William Whitaker was the first documented pioneer of European descent to settle permanently in what became the village of Sarasota. After time spent along the Manatee River at the village of Manatee, Whitaker built upon Yellow Bluffs, just north of present-day Eleventh Street. He sold dried fish and roe to Cuban traders working the coast and in 1847, he began a cattle business.

Edwards - In 1874, Arthur Britton Edwards, better known as A. B. Edwards, was born in what now is The Uplands neighborhood on bay front land homesteaded earlier by his parents who settled in the area soon after the Civil War. His parents died when he was fourteen and he became the sole supporter of his siblings. Eventually, he became a major contributor to the attraction of migrants to and developers of Sarasota and, when the community changed its form of government to that of a "city", he was elected its first mayor and began to serve on January 1, 1914.

Webb - In 1867, John G. Webb and his family moved from Utica, New York to Florida, looking for a place to settle. After arriving in Key West, the pioneer family met a Spanish trader. He told them about a high bluff of land on Sarasota Bay that would make a good location for a homestead. When the Webbs arrived in Sarasota looking for the bluff, they described it to William Whitaker. He led them right to it because of the description. The site was several miles south of the settlement of the Whitakers and after settling, the Webb's named their homestead Spanish Point, in honor of the trader.

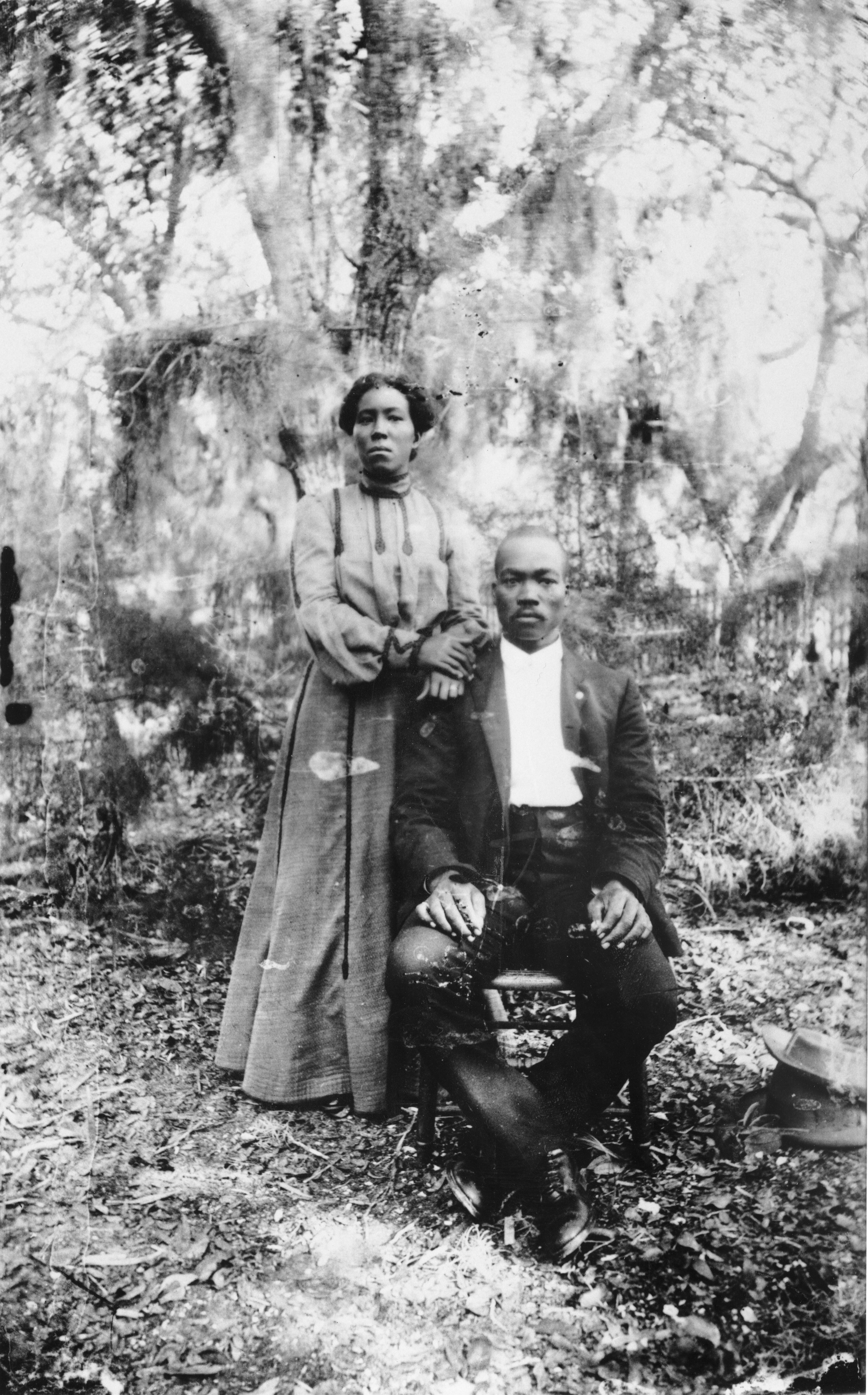
Lewis and Irene Colson, the first black settlers in Sarasota who, in 1884, assisted in surveying the Town of Sarasota

Lewis Colson - Born in 1844, Lewis Colson came to Sarasota as a surveyor with the Florida Mortgage and Investment Company in 1894. Colson was a former slave, a fisherman, a landowner, and a Reverend in early Sarasota. He and his wife Irene, a midwife, settled in the neighborhood then known as Black Bottom (later known as Overtown). During his early years, Colson worked for engineer Richard E. Paulson. He later donated property to build the city's first African American Church, Bethlehem Baptist Church. Colson was its reverend from 1899 to 1915. Historian Annie M. McElroy describes Colson as "one of the most respected black men in Sarasota during his lifetime". In the early years of Overtown, black residents developed a thriving community with businesses, shops, churches, and social centers. The Colson Hotel, constructed in 1926, was named in Lewis Colson's honor, and catered to African American tourists up until the 1950s when it was renamed the Palm Hotel. Colson Avenue is also named in his honor. A historical marker at Five Points Park in downtown Sarasota, credits Colson as the "former slave [and] respected community leader... who drove the stake that marked the center of Five Points." Colson, who died in 1922, and his wife Irene, are the only African Americans buried in Rosemary Cemetery.

Browning and Gillespie - In 1885 a Scots colony was established in Sarasota, which at the time was portrayed as a tropical paradise that had been built into a thriving town. A town had been platted and surveyed before the parcels were sold by the Florida Mortgage and Investment Company. When the investors in the "Ormiston Colony" arrived by ship in December, they found that their primitive settlement lacked the homes, stores, and streets promised.

Only a few Scots, such as the Browning family, remained in Sarasota along with a determined member of the developer's family, John Hamilton Gillespie. He was a manager for Florida Mortgage & Investment Company and began to develop Sarasota following the plan for the failed colony. In 1887, he built the De Sota Hotel that opened on February 25 hosting a large social event and celebration. Eventually, tourists arrived at a dock built on the bay. In May 1886 he completed a two-hole golf course. By 1905, he had completed a 110-acre (45 ha) nine-hole course.

A young Owen Burns

Owen Burns - Owen Burns had come to Sarasota for its famed fishing and remained for the rest of his life. He became the largest landowner in the city, founded a bank, promoted the development of other businesses, and built its bridges, landmark buildings, and mansions. He dredged the harbor and created new bay front points with reclaimed soils. He created novel developments such as Burns Court (located in what now is referred to as Burns Square) to attract tourists and he built commercial establishments to generate additional impetus to the growing community.

He also went into a business partnership with John Ringling to develop the barrier islands, a fateful decision that bankrupted him when his partner failed to live up to commitments on development agreements. In 1925, Burns built the El Vernona Hotel, naming it after his wife, Vernona Hill Freeman Burns. Shortly after the opening of the hotel, the land boom crash in Florida struck a fatal blow to his finances because of the unfulfilled partnership agreement. Ironically, it was the same former partner, John Ringling, who took advantage of the situation and purchased the hotel for a portion of its value, although several years later, with the crash of the stock market, Ringling met the same financial fate.

Beside the landmarks, bridges, and developments he built, Burns contributed to the attraction of many around the country to Sarasota. Among his five children, he also raised the most important historian for the community, his daughter, Lillian G. Burns.

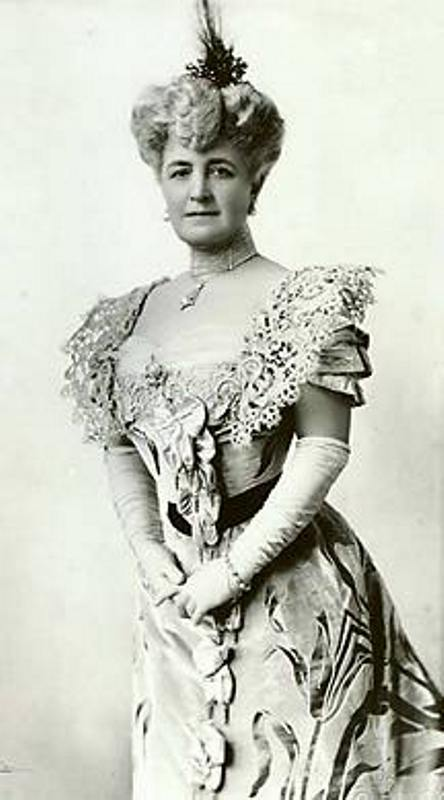
Bertha Palmer, the largest landholder, rancher, farmer, and developer of the area at the start of the 20th century

Bertha Palmer- Bertha Palmer (Bertha Honoré Palmer) was the region's largest landholder, rancher, and developer around the start of the twentieth century, where she purchased more than 90,000 acres (360 km^{2}) of property. She was attracted to Sarasota by an advertisement placed in a Chicago newspaper by A. B. Edwards. They maintained a business relationship for the rest of her life. The Palmer National Bank, established on Main Street at Five Points, remained a strong bank led by her sons through the depression and merged with Southeast Bank in 1976.

Bertha Palmer also owned a large tract of land that now is Myakka State Park. During this period this land was operated as a ranch. She developed and promoted many innovative practices that enabled the raising of cattle to become a large-scale reality in Florida. At her "Meadowsweet Farms", Palmer also pioneered large-scale farming and dairy in the area, making significant contributions to practices that enabled the development of crops that could be shipped to markets in other parts of the country. The contemporary "Celery Fields" now developed into an internationally recognized birding destination, is located on an area she developed to raise celery for shipment to those markets she envisioned. Her experimentation was coordinated with the state department of agriculture.

As war in Europe threatened, Bertha Palmer touted the beauty of Sarasota and its advantages to replace the typical foreign destinations of her social peers. Palmer made her winter residence on the land that the Webb family had homesteaded. She built a resort intended to appeal to these new visitors to the area. She quickly established Sarasota as a fashionable location for winter retreats of the wealthy and as a vacation destination for tourists, which endured beyond the war years and blossomed for the new wealth that developed more broadly in the United States during the 1920s and after the Second World War.

In her early publicity, Palmer compared the beauty of Sarasota Bay to the Bay of Naples, and also touted its sports fishing. As the century advanced, the bounty of the bay continued to attract visitors, until overfishing depleted its marine life.

Palmer retained most of the original Webb Family structures and greatly expanded the settlement. The pioneer site has been listed on the National Register of Historic Places as Historic Spanish Point and is open to the public for a fee. Her tourist accommodations at The Oaks have not been preserved, however.

Also arriving in 1910, Owen Burns closely followed Bertha Palmer to Sarasota and, with two purchases, he quickly became the largest landholder within what now is the city, therefore many of the huge Sarasota properties she owned are in what now is Sarasota County (which did not exist during her lifetime). Many of its roads bear the names she put on the trails she established. She did participate, however, in speculation in the city along with others, purchasing undeveloped land in great quantities, and many parcels bear her name or that of her sons among those in abstracts.

After Bertha Palmer died in 1918, her sons continued her enterprises and remained as investors and donors in Sarasota. Bertha drew worldwide attention to the city as a vacation destination and a location for winter residences. She also introduced ranching and agricultural reforms to the area. Two state parks are located on properties she held, portions of the Oscar Scherer State Park and the Myakka River State Park.

== Late 19th century ==
During the late 19th century, Florida, like the western frontier, saw a wave of violence. In Sarasota this included vigilante killings and an organized crime syndicate known as the Sarasota Assassination Society.

The Browning and Whitaker pioneer families, gathered for a photograph in Sarasota, Florida during 1886 – Sarasota County History Center collection

In 1890, the U.S. Army Corps of Engineers began dredging what would eventually be known as the Gulf Intracoastal Waterway (ICW). The Gulf ICW is the many natural deep water sections as well as humanmade cuts, canals, and channels that connect the entire Sarasota Bay system. The original intention of the waterway was to connect Southwest Florida to the growing national intracoastal network. The creation of the Gulf ICW coincided with and contributed to a huge population boom in the region in and around Sarasota.

On June 1, 1899, the Sarasota Times published its first issue. It was later renamed Sarasota County Times when Sarasota split off from Manatee County.

== 20th and 21st centuries ==
=== 1900s ===
Sarasota was incorporated as a town on the night of October 14, 1902 having a population of 53 residents with John Hamilton Gillespie being sworn in as mayor and a municipal charter being created. It was later re-platted in 1912 and then incorporated as a city in 1913, with A. B. Edwards being the first mayor for the new city government.

Other communities in the area were incorporated or began to grow into towns that were quite distinct from the bay front community whose plat ended at what is now Tenth Street. They were later absorbed as Sarasota grew, but some have retained their names and are recognized today as neighborhoods. Some communities, such as Overtown, Bay Haven, Indian Beach, Shell Beach, Bee Ridge, and Fruitville have all but faded from the memory of most living there now. Overtown's existence as Sarasota's first African-American neighborhood was lost through urban renewal and it was officially renamed the historic Rosemary District in 1994. The Ringling College of Art and Design includes for its administration building, a hotel developed for the community of Bay Haven when Old Bradenton Road was the main thoroughfare north to the Manatee River. Tamiami Trail was developed in the mid-1920s and a bridge built across Bowlees Creek eliminated it as a natural barrier limiting development. Shell Beach, where the Sapphire Shores and The Uplands developments are today on the highest land along the bay, became the location where grand estates were built.

Another major factor that helped this area grow was the railroad. In 1902, a railroad bridge was built across the Manatee River that is about 11 miles north of Sarasota. The bridge was built by the West Indies Railroad. Ten years after this in 1912, the first bridge leading south across the river to Bradenton was built.

=== 1910s ===
==== Introduction of the Ringling family ====
Mary Louise and Charles N. Thompson platted Shell Beach in 1895 on land that had been homesteaded by the Edwards family. The Thompsons built their residence on the property near what now is Bay Shore Road. Their property extended from what now is Sun Circle almost to Bowlees Creek. From 1911 onward, Mable and John Ringling spent their winter stays in that house and eventually, they purchased it and a large parcel of Thompson property for their permanent winter quarters in Sarasota. Along with being a land developer, Thompson was a manager with another circus. He attracted several members of the Ringling family to Sarasota as a winter retreat as well as for investments in land. Although wealthy, the Ringling brothers did not have their immense circus wealth at the time they initially came to Sarasota, as the Ringling Brothers Circus had not yet been consolidated as a single entity, however that changed quickly once it was consolidated.

The Alf T. Ringling family was the first of the extended family to settle in the area and they settled in the Whitfield Estates area with extensive land holdings. The families of Charles and John Ringling followed, living farther to the south. Soon, children and members of the extended family increased the presence of the Ringling family in Sarasota. Following the death of Alf T. in 1919, Charles Ringling assumed many of his duties.

Charles Ringling invested in land, developed property, and founded a bank. He participated actively in Sarasota's civic life and gave advice to other entrepreneurs starting new businesses in Sarasota. From his bank, he loaned money to fledgling businesses. He encouraged the establishment of a county government separated from Manatee and donated land to the newly formed county—upon which he also built its government offices and courthouse as a gift to the community.

Ringling Boulevard was named for Charles Ringling. Ringling Boulevard is a winding road leading east from the bay front at what now is Tamiami Trail toward the winter circus headquarters. It crosses Washington Boulevard where Charles Ringling built the Sarasota Terrace Hotel, a high-rise in the Chicago style of architecture, opposite the site that Ringling later donated for the county seat. The hotel was readily accessible by train at the time.

Charles Ringling and his wife, Edith, began building their bay front winter retreat in the early 1920s. Charles Ringling died in 1926, just after it was completed. For decades Edith Ringling remained there and continued her role in the administration of the circus, assuming many duties of her husband, and her cultural activities in the community. Her daughter, Hester, and her sons were active in Sarasota's theatrical and musical venues. What came to be known internationally as the Edith Ringling Estate is now the center of the campus of New College of Florida.

==== New developments ====
During the 1910s, many modern improvements such as: the city sewer and water system was expanded to cover the entire city by the early 1910s and the first paved road leading to Venice was built.

Map of McClellan Park, a bay and bayou front subdivision designed by the McClellan sisters

In 1913, two sisters Katherine McClellan and Daisietta McClellan became real estate developers creating the McClellan Park subdivision. In their plat filed from that year, the design was unique in the way that it deviated from the typical grid system used for large developments. It provided a yacht basin, tennis courts, and other recreational sport facilities.

City Island is an artificial island that was created during this period. Starting in 1914, an 8 foot (2.4 m) deep channel was dredged with the intent of creating a port at Payne Terminal, located at Centennial Park, and with warehouses on the island. The port venture was not successful, being used by only a few ships. Most of the docks later burned.

As Sarasota grew, so did the population of African-American workers. But expansion of the segregated Overtown neighborhood was limited because it was surrounded by all-white neighborhoods. In 1914, the Newtown neighborhood was established further to the north. Newtown is now listed in the National Register of Historic Places

On November 10, 1915, a group of local leaders formed a committee to work on and develop the local roads and bridges. They planned to "create thirty-four miles of well-paved roads" and bridges to help facilitate travel, especially between Sarasota and northern Manatee County (Sarasota being part of Manatee County at the time), as well as south to Venice, east to Miakka, and south east to Bee Ridge (all nearby communities). Construction continued until World War I, when cutbacks in labor and materials limited what could be accomplished. The work that was completed proved to be shoddily done. For example, the bridge to Siesta Key began deteriorating almost as soon as it was built, with large pieces of cement falling off into the bay, and the road north to Bradenton was filled with potholes. Frustration with the building project and the Manatee County commissioners gave Sarasota citizens further incentive to form their own county.

On April 14, 1913, the Woman's Club of Sarasota was founded with sixty-three charter members. The organization would promote civic works and "social improvements," such as helping to support local schools and libraries. The organization is still active as of 2022.

=== Post–World War I expansion wave ===
Following the end of World War I, an economic boom began in Sarasota. The city was flooded with new people seeking jobs, investment, and the chic social milieu that had been created by earlier developers.

During the 1920s, Sarasota built upon progress made in the prior decade. Electricity became reliable with the building of an FPL power station in June 1920. During the early 1920s a bond issue was approved to pay for improving the existing plant, extending power lines and constructing two new power stations. However, only one new power station was built. Thanks to increasing dissatisfaction with leadership of Manatee County, in 1921 several influential Sarasotans pushed for the creation of a new county and on May 12, 1921, Governor Cary Hardee signed a bill creating Sarasota County, with Sarasota serving as the county seat.

In September 1923, the citizens of Sarasota built a baseball diamond and grandstand on land sold to the city at a discounted rate by Calvin and Martha Payne. The facility would eventually be called Payne Park. After several unsuccessful attempts to get a professional baseball team to use the facilities for spring training, in 1924, the city was able to secure the New York Giants to start traveling down to Sarasota. It has been reported that John Ringling helped convince the Giant's management in this decision. The Giants would use Payne Park for three years, ending in 1927.

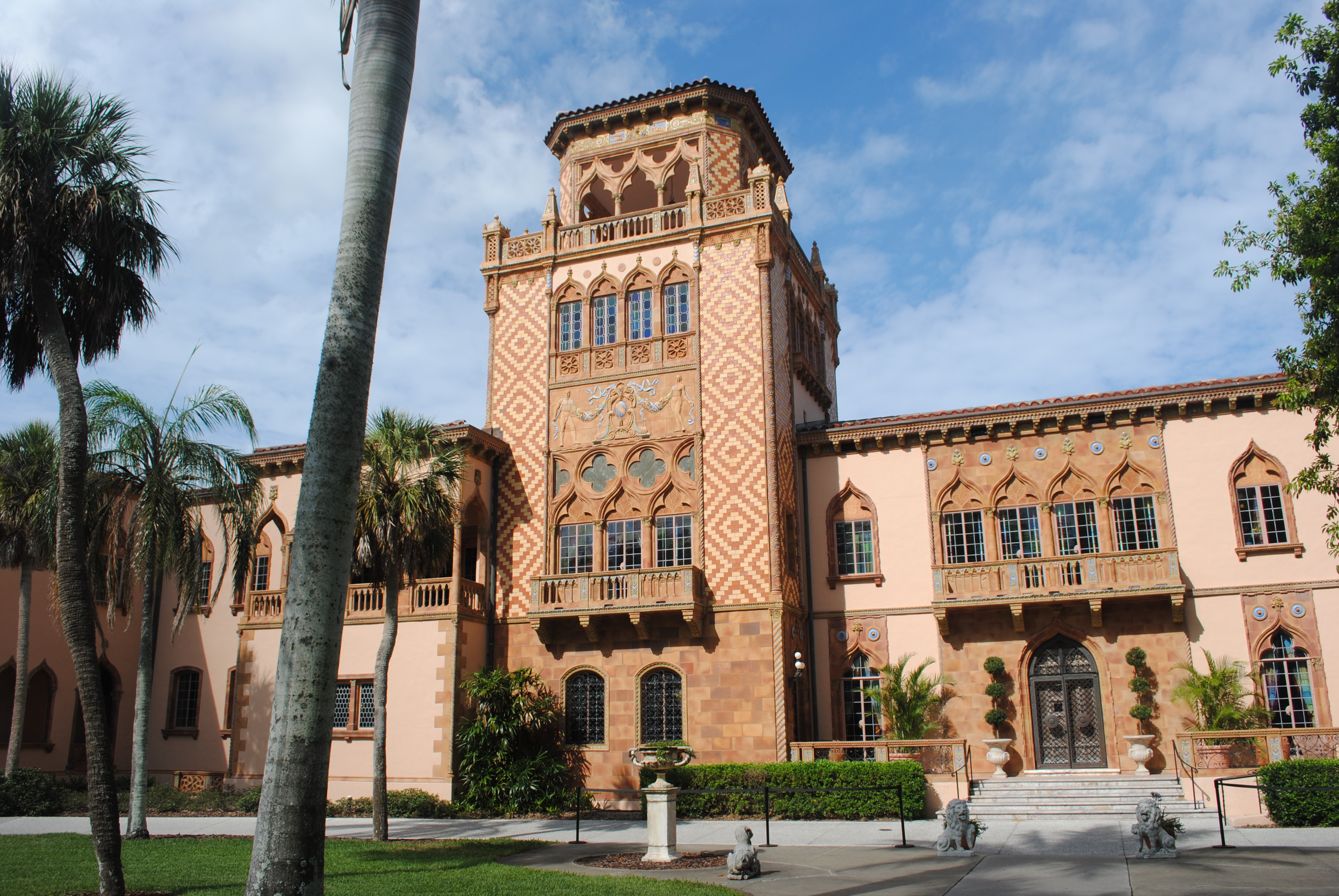
Cà d'Zan, Mable and John Ringling's 1925 Sarasota residence, is listed on the National Register of Historic Places

Sarasota saw extensive development during the Florida Land Boom. The population of the area around Sarasota grew from 3,000 in 1920 to over 15,000 by 1926. By the late 1920s, Sarasota was the largest city on the Gulf Coast south of St. Petersburg and Sarasota County was one of the wealthiest counties in the United States.

John Ringling was the most prominent real estate developers. Ringling wanted to reshape the city into a resort town to rival those along the East Coast of Florida and also planned out: casinos, bayside homes, yacht basins, resorts along the water and eventually even inland oil wells.

A master plan for the city was developed by city planner John Nolen but was never implemented.

=== Florida land boom crash, Great Depression, and World War II ===
The Roaring Twenties ended early for Sarasota. Florida was the first area in the United States to be affected by the financial problems that led to the Great Depression. In 1926, development speculation began to collapse with bank failures on the eastern coast of Florida, much earlier than most parts of the country. The financial difficulties spread throughout Florida. John Ringling initially profited from the economic crash. Ringling put his partner, Owen Burns, into bankruptcy by defaulting on his obligations to him and using money from the treasury of their corporation for use on another Ringling project that was failing. Ringling then purchased the landmark El Vernona Hotel from Burns at a fraction of its worth. Soon however, John Ringling, too, lost most of his fortune. Shortly after the June 1929 death of his wife, Mable, his reversal began because stock investments were affected by the stock market crash.

Just before the market crashed, Ringling had purchased several other circuses with hopes of combining them with the existing circus and he intended to sell shares on the stock exchange. The crash ended that plan. While Ringling continued to invest in expensive artwork, he left grand projects unfinished, such as a Ritz hotel on one of the barrier islands. He abandoned his plans for an art school as an adjunct to the museum. Ringling did lend his name to an art school established by others in Sarasota, however reluctantly.

The board of the circus, which included Edith Ringling and other members of the family, removed John Ringling and placed another director in charge of the corporation. By the time of his death in 1936, John Ringling was close to bankruptcy. His estate was saved only because he had willed it, together with his art collection, to the state and he died shortly before he would have become bankrupt.

==== Financial crisis ====
During the Great Depression the city was in a financial crisis too as it was $6 million in debt because of unpaid bonds, taxes and property assessments. Sarasota, like many other cities during the Florida Land Boom would issue bonds to pay for new infrastructure which later led to debt in these cities.

City limits which had been aggressively expanded during the land boom from under 2 square miles (5.2 km^{2}) to 67 square miles (170 km^{2}) in 1925 after a new charter for the city was signed by the Governor which ended up being reduced to 17 square miles (44 km^{2}) in December 1926 as a way to save money.

==== Circus and federal relief helped the economy ====
Starting in 1927, the circus began to be headquartered in Sarasota between December and March of every year, which continued until the headquarters was moved to Venice in 1959. That helped to mitigate the effects of the Great Depression in Sarasota, as it provided tourists to the area and seasonal jobs. A variety of federal relief projects undertaken in the city would also help provide jobs.

Despite the bad economic situation, the population of Sarasota increased by close to fifty per cent. Those who lived in Sarasota got through the Great Depression by growing their own food and doing bartering as there was close to no money in circulation. A committee on the unemployment situation created by the Chamber of Commerce in 1931 found that jobs that already were rare, were going to non residents. As a result, it distributed pledge cards in June to employers asking them to hire as many employees as possible for the last two weeks of June and the first week of July. Transient workers were another issue in the city as well as the state. Transient workers cut wood in exchange for a cup of coffee or for food and afterward, they were asked to leave the city with a police escort to city lines. Throughout the Great Depression the city relied on tourism as one of its primary economic drivers. Sarasota would start to recover starting in 1935 mirroring a pattern seen in other resort cities in Florida like St. Petersburg. During 1936 the city would see the most building permits given since 1927.

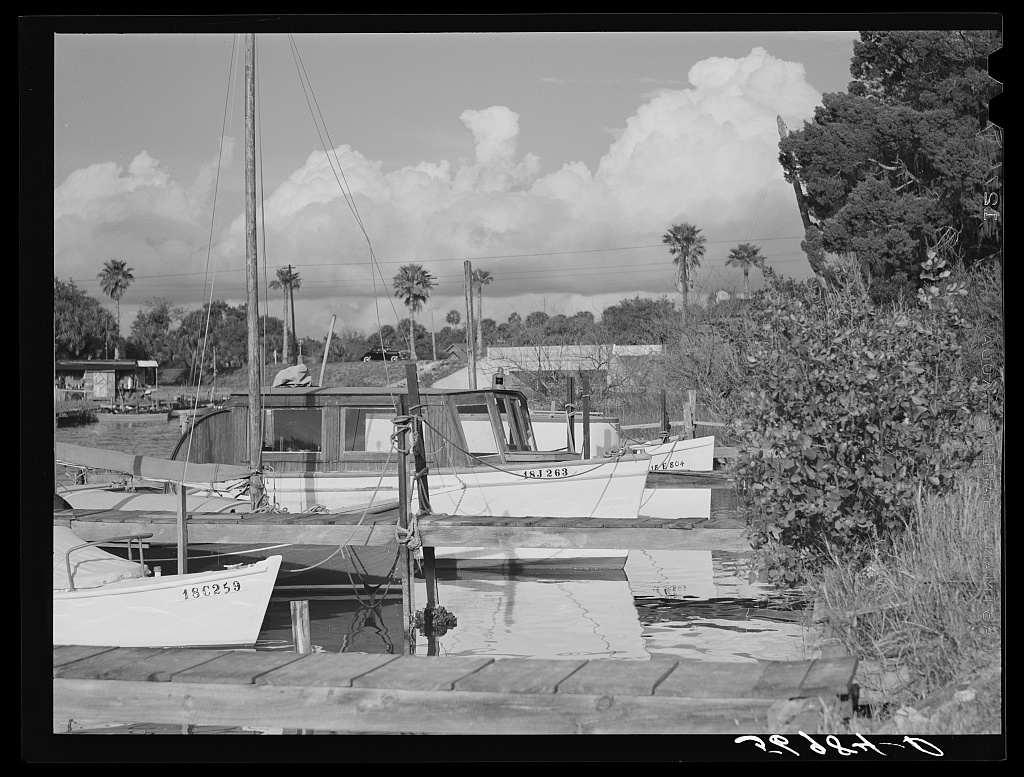
Boats moored at the docks of a trailer park in January 1941

With federal WPA and CCC funding several notable projects were completed during this period, such as: the Municipal Auditorium, Bayfront Park, the Sarasota-Bradenton Airport terminal, and the Lido Casino.

In 1942, with the U.S. having joined in WWII, the Sarasota-Bradenton airport was leased to the U.S. Army Air Corps. The 97th Bombardment Group was the first to be stationed at Sarasota but the B-17 Bombers were too heavy for the runway so the airfield switched over to a training ground for fighters.

=== 1950s–1990s ===
==== 1950s–1960s ====
Sarasota experienced a surge of growth during the 1950s as part of the post-World War II economic boom. New subdivisions were created in areas surrounding Sarasota, such as Kensington Park that contained 1,400 lots located to the northeast of Sarasota and Southgate to Sarasota's south that covered 1,240 acres. Downtown Sarasota would start to become less of the city' center in the 1950s as other developments started to emerge and the city became more decentralized. Less of the county's total population would start to be from within Sarasota's city limits and the city's population itself would also increase as also seen at the county level too between 1950 and 1970.

Tamiami Trail was rerouted during this time period as well, in an attempt to make traffic flow more efficiently. This resulted in the creation of the Bayfront Drive area between what now is Bayfront Drive and Gulfstream Avenue that was created with fill gathered from dredging Sarasota Bay. Those who owned property on Gulfstream Avenue objected to the changes, but the project ultimately prevailed.

In 1951, Cecil B. DeMille shot his film The Greatest Show on Earth in Sarasota. The filming brought in money for local businesses and citizens as well as helped bring more notability to the city.

Bayfront areas in the city would witness changes to them during the 1960s. Hoover Arcade at the end of Main Street which housed the Sarasota City Hall would be demolished in 1967 as it was looking for a more modern city hall. The Hover Arcade was built in 1913 and was located alongside Sarasota Bay but had become landlocked after the rerouting of Tamiami Trail and its subsequent filling project.

===== Civil Rights movement =====
Like many other cities in the United States, Sarasota experienced social changes during the Civil Rights Movement of the 1950s and 1960s. The community was similar to many other places in the United States having racial segregation in it. Any African-American resident going outside of Overtown and Newtown had to receive a work permit or permission from their employer. The Sarasota NAACP chapter organized a wade-in protest on October 2, 1955, after several years of requests by Black residents for a beach they could use. After the protest occurred, a majority of local residents and the city and county commissions voiced a preference for creating a beach for African Americans. However, neither the city commission nor the county commission could identify a location for it on Longboat Key, Siesta Key along Big Pass, or an artificial beach on the Siesta Key side of Midnight Pass. Both Siesta Key locations were determined unsuitable as a beach site because of either the fast currents or a need for dredging. At the Longboat Key and Siesta Key sites significant opposition from local residents in those areas was expected. Longboat Key residents held meetings as a way to protest a Black beach location there and they decided to incorporate into a municipality as a way of avoiding the placement of the designated beach there. Protests occurred in Sarasota on a weekly basis until all of the beaches were desegregated.

The city government was strongly against integration of the beaches, however. A city ordinance was passed on September 4, 1956, that allowed the Sarasota Police Department to remove all people at a public beach in city limits if there were two racial groups present at the same time. After failing to designate a Black beach, the city commission proposed creating a pool in Newtown instead. The pool opened in November 1957. During construction of the pool the protests paused, but resumed because African American residents wanted to be able to go to the beach. Also during 1957, the NAACP asked the Sarasota County school board to desegregate the public schools, but it did not do so. In 1961, the NAACP filed a lawsuit against the school board for failing to desegregate its schools. The same year, the federal government threatened to withhold its anti-beach erosion funding if the municipal government of Sarasota continued to segregate its beaches.

During 1962, the county school board integrated its first school in the city, Bay Haven Elementary School located in Indian Beach Sapphire Shores, allowing Black students to enroll. It is unclear exactly when beaches in the city were desegregated as it was never formally enacted, but it is presumed to have happened when the Civil Rights Act of 1964 was passed. With the passing of the Civil Rights Act, all schools were ordered to integrate by 1967. To accommodate for this, the Sarasota County school board closed the African American schools, Booker Junior High School in 1967 and Booker High School the following year. Black students were bused to existing all-white schools.

In 1967, the city passed the aforementioned ordinance against interracial beaches. Protests occurred against it until enforcement of the ordinance ended, at point undocumented in official records.

Booker Elementary and Amaryllis Park Primary School closed in 1969. The local NAACP sent a resolution to the county school board asking for busing of white students to the Booker schools, but the board rejected the plan. Many local Black residents supported integration, but felt a sense of pride in their own local schools. Much tension resulted from Black students going to predominantly white schools. A local meeting held at the Newtown Community Center on May 3, 1969, to take action against the school district's integration plan. By the end of the meeting attendees agreed to attend local "Freedom Schools" established outside of the school district in order to protest. It began the next day and lasted for another five days. On May 9, the school district decided to keep both Booker Elementary School and Amaryllis Park Primary School open and to take action against the students who missed class and their parents. Booker Elementary School became a magnet school in order to encourage white students to enroll voluntarily. Booker High School and Booker Junior High School made the same change in 1970.

=== 21st century ===
On September 11, 2001, President George W. Bush was reading The Pet Goat in Emma E. Booker Elementary School when he was informed of the attacks on the World Trade Center in Manhattan. Mohamed Atta and co-conspirator Marwan al-Shehhi, who piloted the hijacked jets, undertook part of their pilot training during 2000 at the Sarasota-Bradenton Airport through the former Jones Aviation facility that was located in Manatee County.

Sarasota became identified as an epicenter of the 2008 real estate crash. It followed financial credit problems that began with pedatory lending practices that resulted in mortgages failing during massive real estate speculation that began in the late 1990s and the situation escalating dramatically during the early 2000s. Once the values of the properties began to fall the mortgages purchased with consideration of "equity value" derived from the rapid speculative increases in property values, became problematic. The properties were no longer worth the value of the mortgages, some by great differences. This occurred nationwide and in other countries as well.

In 2010, an island in Sarasota was renamed temporarily to "Google Island" in an attempt to get Google Fiber installed in the city.

In January 2017, an estimated 10,000 protesters marched across the John Ringling Causeway in solidarity with woman's organizations around the world. The protest was one of the largest in Sarasota's history.

On September 28, 2022, Hurricane Ian made landfall in the State of Florida. The Category 5 hurricane had a 200-mile wind field that caused winds exceeding 85 miles per hour within Sarasota County. The county suffered 10 fatalities due to the storm, making it the second highest county for casualties behind Lee County.
