= Thomas Maclellan =

Thomas Maclellan may refer to:

- Thomas Maclellan of Bombie (died 1597), Provost of Kirkcudbright
- Thomas Maclellan, 2nd Lord Kirkcudbright (died 1647), Scottish nobleman, grandson of the above

== See also ==
- A. Thomas McLellan (born 1949), psychologist
- Thomas N. McClellan (1853–1906), associate justice and chief justice of the Supreme Court of Alabama
- MacLellan (surname)
