= William McLellan =

William McLellan or MacLellan may refer to:

- William McLellan (Australian politician) (1831–1906), mining agent and politician in colonial Victoria
- William McLellan (Scottish electrical engineer) (1874–1934), known for contributions to hydroelectric power
- William McLellan (American electrical engineer) (1924–2011), known for contributions to nanotechnology
- William McLellan (sea captain) (1735 – July 28, 1815), American merchant sea captain
- William Walker McLellan (1873–1960), founder of McLellan Stores
- William H. McLellan (1832–1912), American lawyer and politician
- Sir William Maclellan (knight) (15th century), Scottish nobleman
- William MacLellan, 4th Lord Kirkcudbright (c. 1647–1668), Scottish peer
- William MacLellan, 6th Lord Kirkcudbright (c. 1690–1762), Scottish peer

== See also ==
- William E. McLellin (1806–1883), early leader in the Latter Day Saint movement
