= McClellan =

McClellan is a Scottish surname. The most notable person with this name is probably George B. McClellan (1826–1885), American Civil War general and creator of the Army of the Potomac. Other notable persons with the surname include:

== A ==
- Antwan McClellan (born c. 1974), New Jersey state legislator

== B ==
- Barr McClellan (born 1939), Texas lawyer and author, father of Mark and Scott McClellan
- Beverly McClellan (1969–2018), American singer and contestant in the first season of the American TV series The Voice
- Brian McClellan (born 1986), American writer of fantasy

== C ==
- Chris McClellan (soccer) (born 1981), American soccer player
- Chris McClellan (American football) (born 2003), American football player
- C. M. S. McLellan (1865–1916), American playwright and composer, also wrote as Hugh Morton

== E ==
- Edwin North McClellan (1881–1971), United States Marine Corps officer, author, and historian

== G ==
- George McClellan (New York politician) (1856–1927), U.S. Representative from New York
- George McClellan (physician) (1796–1847), surgeon and founder of Jefferson Medical College in Philadelphia, Pennsylvania
- George McClellan (police officer) (1908–1982), Commissioner of the Royal Canadian Mounted Police
- George B. McClellan Jr. (1865–1940), Mayor of New York City and U.S. Representative from New York
- George Marion McClellan (1860–1934), American writer
- Gerald McClellan (born 1967), American former professional boxer

== J ==
- James E. McClellan (1926–2016), American veterinarian and politician
- James H. McClellan (born 1947), mathematician and electronic engineer, professor at Georgia Institute of Technology
- Jase McClellan (born 2002), American football player
- John McClellan (chemist) (1810–1881), English chemist and industrialist
- John L. McClellan (1896–1977), U.S. Senator from Arkansas
- Joseph McClellan (1746–1834), American soldier and politician

== K ==
- Katherine Elizabeth McClellan (1859–1934), American photographer
- Kyle McClellan (born 1984), American baseball player
- Kyle McClellan (ice hockey) (born 1999), American ice hockey player

== M ==
- Mark McClellan (born 1963), Medicare and FDA official
- Mike McLellan (born 1981), Canadian indoor lacrosse player

== P ==
- Peter McClellan, Australian jurist, received Bachelor of Laws in 1974

== R ==
- Robert McClellan (congressman) (1806–1860), U.S. Representative from New York
- Robert McClellan (state treasurer) (1747–1817), treasurer of New York state
- Robert H. McClellan (1823–1902), Illinois state senator
- Robert L. McClellan (1822–1889), American politician and lawyer from Pennsylvania

== S ==
- Samuel McClellan (1730–1807), brigadier general in the American Revolutionary War
- Scott McClellan (born 1968), former White House press secretary
- Sid McClellan (1925–2000), footballer who played for Tottenham Hotspur, Portsmouth and Leyton Orient.
- Stephen T. McClellan, Wall Street analyst, author

== T ==
- Thomas N. McClellan (1853–1906), associate justice and chief justice of the Supreme Court of Alabama

== Fictional characters ==
- Clarisse McClellan, a character in Fahrenheit 451 by Ray Bradbury
- "Mrs. McClellan," a character without a first name in Ray Bradbury's story "There Will Come Soft Rains"

== See also ==
- McClellan Air Force Base
- McClellan's General Store, listed on the National Register of Historic Places in Henry County, Iowa
- McClellan Park, California, a census-designated place near Sacramento
- McClellan–Palomar Airport in Carlsbad, California
- McClellan Magnet High School in Little Rock, Arkansas
- The McClellan saddle, used in the late 19th century by U.S. Army cavalry
- USAT McClellan, a US Army Transport ship active during the Spanish-American and First World Wars
- McLellan
- Clan MacLellan, Scottish clan
