= Raeberry Castle =

Castle in Kirkcudbright, Dumfries and Galloway, Scotland, UK

Coordinates: 54.77157°N 4.02379°W

Raeberry Castle was a medieval stronghold on the rugged coast of Kirkcudbrightshire, Galloway, Scotland. Once the principal seat of the Scottish Clan MacLellan, the castle stood on a dramatic promontory overlooking the Solway Firth, southwest of the town of Kirkcudbright. Though no standing structures remain today, the site is rich in archaeological features and lies near other historic landmarks, including St. Margaret's Well of Kirkcudbright and the Neolithic stone circle known as Wallace's Putting Stone.

== Location and surroundings ==
Raeberry Castle is situated on a narrow, rocky promontory west of Big Raeberry Hill, in the parish of Kirkcudbright, Dumfries & Galloway. The promontory rises to an oval stack approximately ninety feet above sea level, with sheer cliffs on three sides and a narrow landward approach fortified by multiple ditches and ramparts.

The site lies near two notable landmarks:

- St. Margaret’s Well of Kirkcudbright (coordinates: 54.772053, −4.022568), a historic spring traditionally associated with healing properties and Christian devotion.
- Wallace's Putting Stone (coordinates: 54.772360, −4.019940), a Neolithic stone circle located on Raeberry Hill, believed to be part of a prehistoric ritual landscape.

These features underscore the long-standing cultural and spiritual significance of the area, spanning from the Neolithic period through the medieval era.

Raeberry Castle, located on Howwell Farm just south of Bombie, Kirkcudbright is traditionally regarded as their chief residence. The castle's strategic coastal position and formidable natural defenses made it a fitting seat for the MacLellans.

In 1452, the castle was besieged by William Douglas, 8th Earl of Douglas, during a period of intense feudal rivalry. Sir Patrick MacLellan, the castle's owner, was captured and imprisoned at Threave Castle, a Douglas stronghold. This event marks the last recorded historical episode involving Raeberry Castle and reflects the volatile political climate of 15th-century Galloway.

== Structure and defences ==
Raeberry Castle was modest in size but well-fortified. The promontory's landward side was protected by at least three defensive ditches:

- The innermost ditch, about 15 metres wide and four metres deep, was adapted from a natural gully and may have been reinforced with a stone wall, traces of which remain as scattered stones.
- Two additional ditches lie further inland, separated by a rampart approximately eight metres thick and one metre high. The outermost ditch is now visible only as a scarp about two metres high.

The castle’s northern approach was once guarded by a thick wall and a drawbridge, both of which were reportedly destroyed around 1750. The interior buildings had already collapsed by the mid-16th century.

== Archaeological record ==
By the late 19th century, only faint traces of Raeberry Castle remained. F. R. Coles described remnants of lime and stone along the eastern edge of the promontory, as well as ramparts at either end and two bold entrenchments inland. The interior is now overgrown with vegetation, and only shallow depressions and low mounds suggest the former presence of structures or excavation trenches.

A later trackway, likely constructed to facilitate stone robbing, crosses the innermost ditch via a rough causeway.

== Etymology and norse origins ==
The name "Raeberry" is believed to derive from the Old Norse raudr berg or raudabiorg, meaning "red rock" or "red headland," referencing the reddish hue of the promontory's stone. This coloration may be due to iron content or the presence of Old Red Sandstone, which is found elsewhere along the coast. Historians have speculated that the site may have been originally fortified by Norse settlers during their rule over Galloway in the 11th century, though no definitive archaeological evidence supports this theory.

== Legacy ==
Though Raeberry Castle has long since vanished from the landscape, its historical significance endures. As an ancestral seat of Clan MacLellan, it played a significant role in the feudal history of Galloway. Its dramatic setting, formidable defenses, and proximity to ancient landmarks like Wallace's Putting Stone and St. Margaret's Well underscore the site's enduring cultural resonance.

Today, Raeberry Castle remains a place of quiet historical intrigue – where medieval ambition, Norse legend, and prehistoric ritual landscapes converge on a solitary headland above the sea.
