= Daniel McClellan =

Daniel or Dan McClellan may refer to:

- Dan McClellan (baseball) (1878–1962), American baseball pitcher and manager
- Daniel McClellan (biblical scholar) (born 1980), American biblical scholar and social media personality

== See also ==
- Daniel McLellan (fl. 1990s), Australian surf swimmer and life saving competitor
