= MacLelan =

MacLelan or McLelan is a surname. Notable people with the surname include:

- Gloud Wilson McLelan (1796–1858), Canadian businessman and politician
- Archibald McLelan, Canadian shipbuilder and politician

== See also ==
- MacLellan (surname)
- McClellan (disambiguation)
- McClelland
