= Patrick Maclellan of Bombie =

Patrick Maclellan of Bombie (died c. 1452) Sheriff of Galloway, then the head of his family, the Clan MacLellan, and a staunch royalist declined an invitation to join William Douglas, 8th Earl of Douglas, along with the Earls of Ross and Crawford and Ormond in a powerful alliance against the young King James II of Scotland.

By marriage to his wife, Margaret Douglas (daughter of Archibald Douglas, 5th Earl of Douglas) William Douglas, a member of the 'Black Douglas' family thereby increased the powers vested in his family and estates to the point where he was the most powerful nobleman in the country. The alliance with the Earls of Ross and Crawford further strengthened his power base, making it apparent they were plotting an overthrow of King James.

George Buchanan's version of events suggests that Maclellan had previously killed one of the Douglas family by whom he had been insulted, but it is generally understood that the cause of quarrel was Maclellan's refusal to join the alliance. The Earl of Douglas, outraged with this opposition to his plot, laid siege to Raeberry Castle (not to be confused with MacLellan's Castle) and captured Sir Patrick Maclellan forcibly removing him to the fortress of Threave Castle, where Maclellan was held a prisoner.

Lord Andrew Gray, Maclellan’s uncle, whose son, Sir Patrick Gray, held a high office at the Court, was able to obtain a letter from King James requesting the earl of Douglas to release his prisoner. Sir Patrick Gray carried the dispatch himself, appearing with the king's letter. William Douglas, suspecting its message, refused to open the dispatch until after Sir Patrick Gray had dined. Treachery was afoot however, in the Douglas camp. Having received such a shrewd guest as Gray, and anticipating his intentions, the earl ordered Maclellan to be immediately put to death.

Douglas then conducted Gray to the courtyard, where Sir Patrick Maclellan's headless body lay. Gray retreated from the castle, almost certainly Threave and not the much lesser castle of Douglas and escaped capture only by his skill as a horseman.

Later at Stirling Castle, by direct invitation of the king to dine, Douglas refused to abandon the alliance. King James stabbed him in the neck, and the king's attendants, including Gray, finished off the murder, throwing the body of Earl Douglas from a window.

His son was William Maclellan, who killed the bandit Black Morrow.
