= David McLellan =

David McLellan may refer to:

- David McLellan (snooker player) (born 1970), Scottish snooker player
- David McLellan (political scientist) (born 1940), British scholar of Marx and Marxism
- David McLellan (Ontario politician) (1841–1892), mayor of Hamilton
- David McLellan (New Brunswick politician) (1839–1894), politician in New Brunswick, Canada
- David McLellan (swimmer) (born 1973), Canadian swimmer
- Dave McLellan, automotive engineer
