= Archibald McLellan =

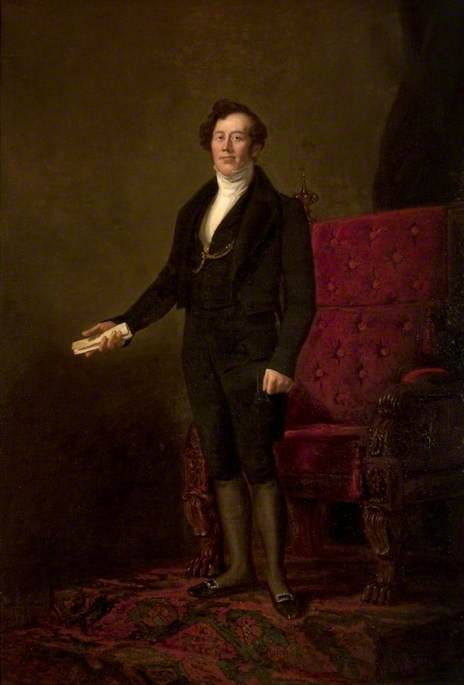
Archibald McLellan by Robert Cree Crawford

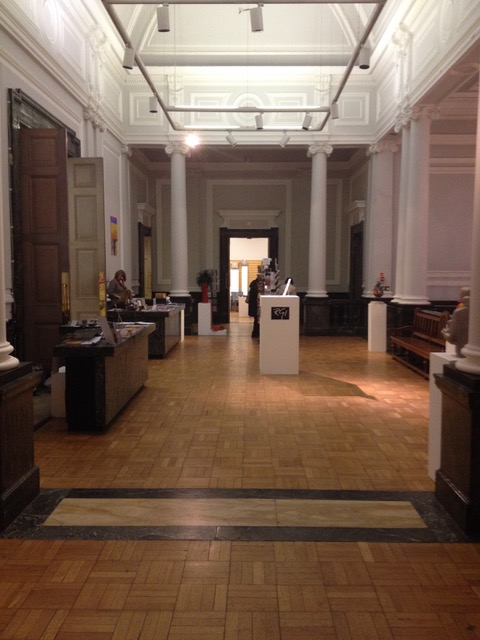
MD11 McLellan Galleries Sculpture Hall in 2013 Royal Glasgow Institute of Fine Arts annual exhibition

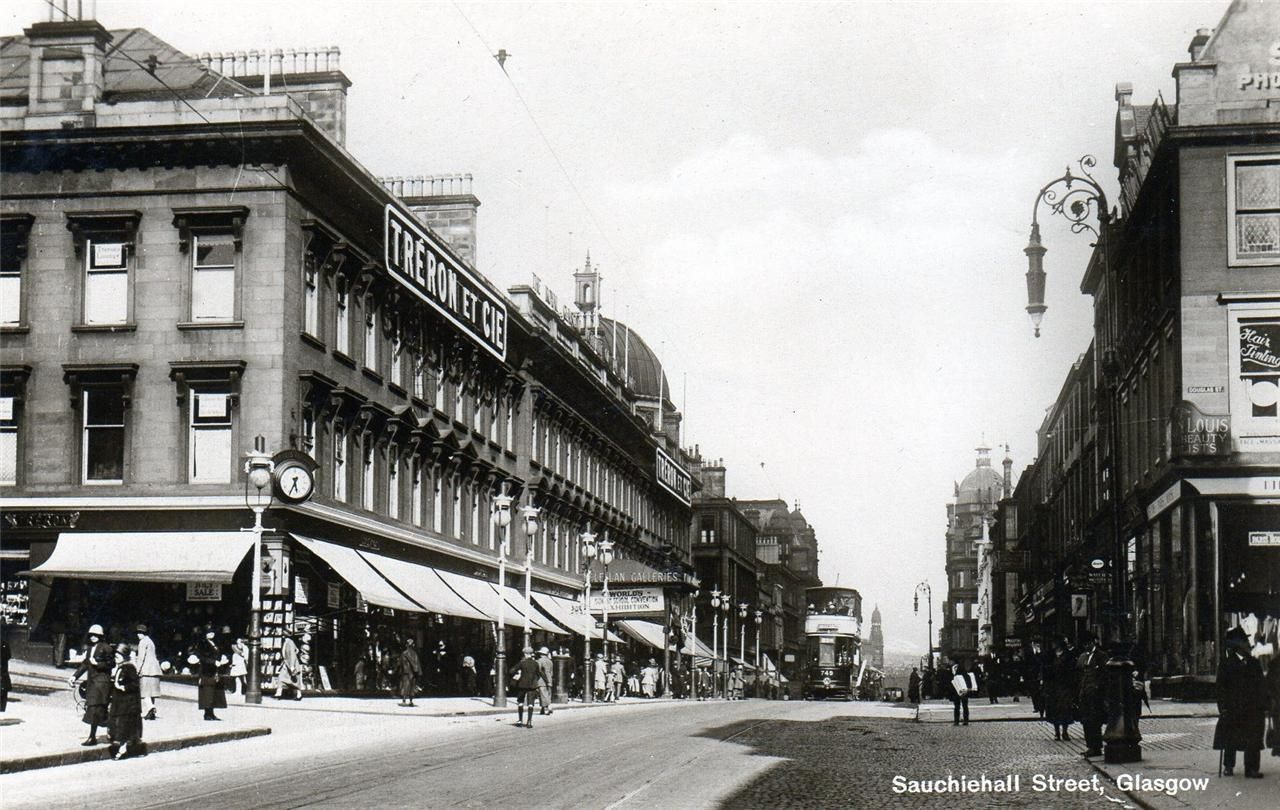
Sauchiehall Street, Glasgow at the McLellan Galleries about 1920

Archibald McLellan (1795 or 1797 – 22 October 1854) was a Glasgow coachbuilder, art collector, councillor and magistrate. The McLellan Galleries on Sauchiehall Street are named after him when Glasgow Corporation bought his galleries and art collection in 1856, which forms the basis of the civic collection of the city now centred on Kelvingrove Art Galleries.

== Early life ==
McLellan was baptised in Glasgow on 12 May 1796. His parents were Archibald McLellan (1746/7–1831), a coach-builder (based in Miller Street) and Christian Shillinglaw (f c.1774–1832).

He was educated at the Grammar School and the University of Glasgow before joining his father in the coachbuilding business where he showed skill as a heraldic draughtsman.

== Career and public roles ==
He was a member of Glasgow Town Council from 1823 and became a Magistrate of the city at 25 years old. As a coachbuilder and harness-maker, he joined the Incorporation of the Hammermen of Glasgow, rising to be appointed Deacon-Convener of The Trades’ House in 1831. He held the office for two years.

He was a member of the Glasgow Dilettanti Society in 1825 (president in 1834), trustee of Anderson's University from 1840, Glasgow Art Union's management committee, and president of the City of Glasgow Fine Art Association at its foundation in 1853. An article by him resulted in efforts to renovate Glasgow Cathedral. His personal art collection was left to the City of Glasgow and formed the basis of its civic art collection.

== Death ==
McLellan died at Mugdock Castle, a favourite residence of his during the summer months, on 22 October 1854, aged 58 and is buried in the Glasgow Necropolis.
