= Black Morrow =

15th-century Scottish outlaw

Black Morrow, also known as Black Murray and Outlaw Murray, is the name given to a late 15th century Scottish outlaw. A popular ballad makes the bandit as living in Ettrick Forest, while a recorded oral tradition, a wood in Kirkcudbrightshire. In the tradition, the outlaw is described as a Romani or Scottish Traveller, Moor, a Saracen or, more commonly, an Irishman or from Ireland. The folklorist David MacRitchie took a strong interest in the ethnicity of the outlaw because of his dark skin, and the story is commonly quoted in modern Afrocentrist literature. Others however (e.g. John Mactaggart) have disputed whether the bandit was dark skinned, or a "Blackimore".

== Written sources ==
The story as a ballad, appears as "An Old Song Called Outlaw Murray" in the Glenriddel Manuscripts (XI, 61) published in 1791. It also appears in Minstrelsy of the Scottish Border, a collection of ballads compiled by Walter Scott (1803). Aytoun's Ballads of Scotland (1859) in a note appended to the ballad mentions an earlier manuscript: "written between the years 1689 and 1702" which contains the song. While the latter manuscript is presumed lost, "it is clear that the ballad was known before 1700; how much earlier it is to be put we can neither ascertain nor safely conjecture". According however to Scott, the ballad or dancing song "appears to have been composed about the reign of James V", while the story itself takes place during the late 15th century. Note that the ballad doesn't describe the bandit as a Gypsy, Saracen or Moor, nor even as Black Murray, only as Outlaw Murray.

A different story related to the ballad is found in Crawford's The Peerage of Scotland (1716) who mentions George Mackenzie, as having written down an oral tradition in 1680.

Unlike the ballad, the tradition describes the bandit as a Moor, who was accompanied by Saracens:

Sometimes it [the crest] represents some valiant Act done by the Bearer ... the Lord Kirkcudbright [his ennobled descendant], does bear a naked Arm, supporting on the point of a sword a Mores [Moor] head; because Bomhie [the ancestral estate] being forfeited, his Son kill'd a More, who came in with some Sarazens to infest Galloway; to the Killer of whom the King had promised the Forfeiture of Bomhie.

— The Science of Heraldry, George Mackenzie

Crawford considered this band of Saracens and Moors, to be Gypsies, despite Mackenzie not describing them as such.

=== Black Murray ===
It remains unclear when Outlaw Murray began to be called Black Murray (Black Morrow) because neither does the recorded tradition call him this; the folklorist David MacRitchie in 1894 traced the name Black Murray to two literary sources (the earliest from 1824), arguing they were local Kirkcudbrightshire versions of the original Mackenzie/Crawford tradition:

Kirkcudbright tradition tells of a certain "Blackimore" "Black Morrow", or "Black Murray", who inhabited a wood near that town, still known as the "Black Morrow Wood" ... It is clear that the "Blackamoor" of both versions, stated in each to have been killed by young Maclellan, is the same as the chief of the "Moors" or "Saracens" whom Sir George Mackenzie speaks of as remembered in tradition as far back as 1680.

The author of The History of Galloway (1841) suggests Morrow or Murray is a corruption of Moor, "who from his swarthy complexion was called Black Morrow". However, in the ballad, Murray is the surname of the bandit which is unlikely to have derived in etymology from the word Moor. The meaning and origin of "Black" is also disputed (see below).

== Story ==
The ballad is different to the Mackenzie/Crawford tradition, although both take place during the late 15th century and the outlaw, or bandit, lives in a Scottish forest (but in the ballad, the outlaw owns an entire stronghold in the woodland). Both are also connected to the names Murray, or Morrow. Walter Scott describes the Outlaw Murray of the ballad: "as a man of prodigious strength, possessing a batton or club, with which he laid lee (i.e. waste) the country for many miles round". This closely resembles the bandit of the Mackenzie/Crawford tradition, but the forest of the ballad is Ettrick Forest, not a wood in Kirkcudbrightshire. Another difference is that in the Mackenzie/Crawford tradition, the bandit is slain by a Maclellan clansman (i.e. William Maclellan), but in the ballad the bandit is not murdered. In a local Kirkcudbrightshire version, MacLellan deliberately replaced spring-water in a well with spirits in order to get bandit drunk. MacLellan is said to have murdered the outlaw for a £50 reward.

== Origin of "Black" in name ==
The word "Black" in Black Murray (Black Morrow) via the early 19th century local Kirkcudbrightshire versions of the tradition, derives from either:

- The dark skin complexion of the Moor bandit (hence the terms "Blackimore" and "Blackamoor").
- The name of the wood where the outlaw lived in Kirkcudbrightshire: "Black Morrow (Plantation)".
- The crimes, evil nature or grim personality of the bandit.

MacRitchie argued for the first view, and that the outlaw was dark skinned. In contrast John Mactaggart who popularized the story in his The Scottish Gallovidian Encyclopedia (1824) argued Black Murray derived his name from his bad deeds (analogous to "Black Douglas") and not swarthy skin, going as far as to deny the bandit was ever a Moor in the first place:

Tradition has him as a Blackimore ... So goes tradition—but my opinion, if it be worth any thing, is, that he was no Blackimore; he never saw Africa; his name must have been Murray, and he must have been too an outlaw and a bloody man, gloomy with foul crimes, Black prefaced it, as did Black Douglas, and that of others; so he became Black Murray.

The bandit as a dark skinned Moor or Saracen, could though explain the Moor's head that appears on the crest of the Arms of Lord Kirkcudbright, and in consequence the modern crest badge used by Clan MacLellan (the blazon for which is an arm supporting on the point of a sword, a Moor's head). Yet another theory links the bandit to the name of the Kirkcudbrightshire wood he lived of the same name (Black Morrow Plantation), but it could alternatively be argued the wood took its name from the outlaw, rather than vice versa.

== See also ==
- Clan MacLellan

== Sources ==
- Crofton, H. T. (1888). "Early Annals of the Gypsies in England". Journal of the Gypsy Lore Society. 1 (1): 5–24.
- Child, F. J. (2003) [1894-1898]. "The Outlaw Murray". The English and Scottish Popular Ballads. Vol. 5. Dover Publications.
- MacRitchie, D. (1894). Scottish Gypsies Under the Stewarts. Edinburgh: David Douglas.
