= Jon MacLellan =

Jon MacLellan is an English computer game level designer. He is best known for his time while working in England for Epic Games' sales, webmaster and technical support office where he was an active part of the game communities surrounding the game studio's games Jazz Jackrabbit 2, and Unreal. He is also credited as a level designer for the titles Jazz Jackrabbit 2, Jazz Jackrabbit 2: The Secret Files, and Jazz Jackrabbit 2: Holiday Hare '98.

Even after his time at Epic Games, Jon continued to be a part of the Jazz Jackrabbit 2 online community, releasing several unofficial custom-made levels to the community. He was also a founder of the level design group concept within the Jazz 2 community, forming the level design group Mystic Legends; a Jazz 2 community level design group where all members would release their levels under this group-name.

When Epic Games decided to shift its focus away from the shareware model and concentrate solely on game design, Jon moved to the United States and for a time worked with MPath Interactive's Xtreme Network and GameSpy Industries on some of their high-profile gaming news websites.

Jon currently resides with his family in Sacramento, CA.
