= McLellan Galleries =

Exhibition space in Glasgow, Scotland

Coordinates: 55.8657°N 4.2635°W

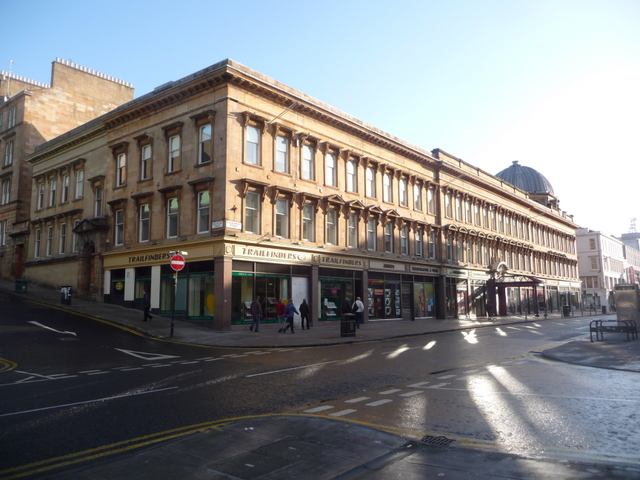
The McLellan Galleries building

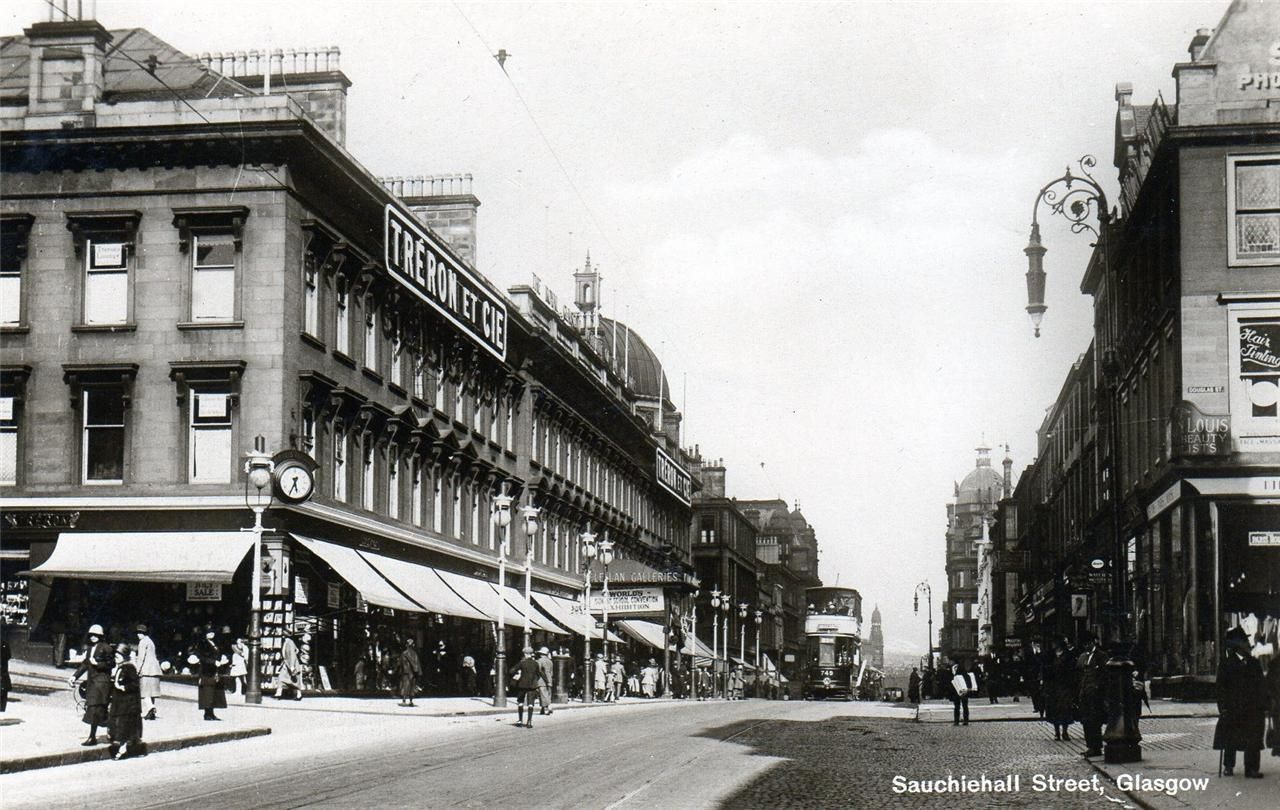
Sauchiehall Street, Glasgow at the McLellan Galleries about 1920

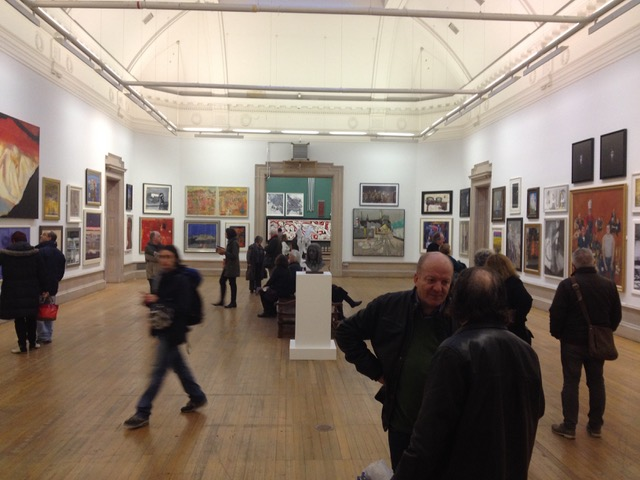
MD12 One of the art galleries in McLellan Galleries 2013 Royal Glasgow Institute of Fine Arts annual exhibition

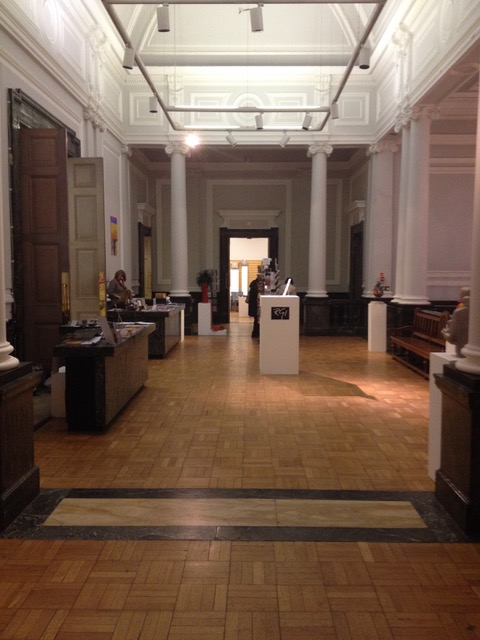
MD11 McLellan Galleries Sculpture Hall in 2013 Royal Glasgow Institute of Fine Arts annual exhibition

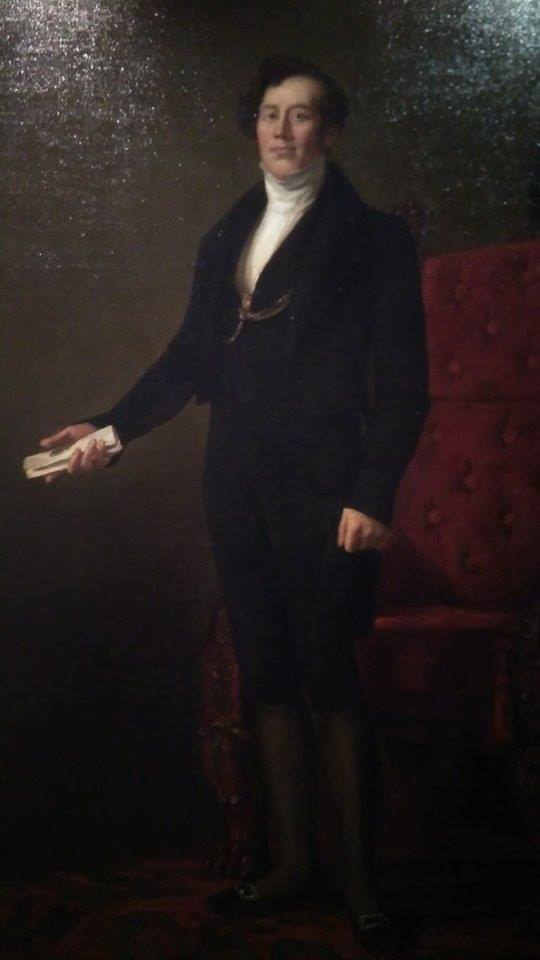
Archibald McLellan by Robert Cree Crawford (after John Graham-Gilbert)

The McLellan Galleries is a major building in the city of Glasgow, Scotland, complete with art galleries and a frontage of shops and offices in Sauchiehall Street. The inner buildings are home to the major art galleries, sculpture hall and function rooms while the frontage building is now used as office workspace for entrepreneurs and small businesses.

== History ==
As part of the city's expansion on Blythswood Hill spearheaded by William Harley, the Galleries were built in 1855-6 to a design by architect James Smith of Blythswood Square at a cost of over £40,000. More accurately, the Corporation bought the original building on 15 May 1856, where Archibald McLellan planned to exhibit his famed art collection, for the sum of £44,500, being £29,500 for the erection – which had three galleries – and £15,000 for the works of art. They are named after their founder, Archibald McLellan (1795–1854), a coach builder, councillor and patron of the arts. His major collection of art and sculpture formed the nucleus of the city's future gallery expansions. Following his death, Glasgow Corporation had acquired the galleries and collection, described in his will to be enjoyed by the public and for a time they were known as the Corporation Galleries of Art before reverting to their former name of McLellan Galleries after the newly built Kelvingrove Museum & Art Galleries opened to the public in 1902. A small part of the Galleries housed Glasgow School of Art from 1869 to 1899.

In addition to the hundreds of artworks from Archibald McLellan, William Ewing presented the city with thirty works of art in 1856 and the remainder in 1874. Mrs John Graham-Gilbert of Yorkhill presented her husband's collection of pictures to Glasgow in 1877, and in 1896 Messrs James Reid of Hyde Park gave ten pictures. All being safely housed in the Galleries. In 1867 the upper floor of the building was transferred into more galleries and exhibition halls. The eastern section was appropriated by the School of Art (previously in Ingram Street). And the western section of the block was occupied by the Royal Philosophical Society of Glasgow, and the Institution of Engineers and Shipbuilders in Scotland. The Galleries also became the home of the Royal Glasgow Institute of the Fine Arts.

For over seven decades to the 1970s the front buildings, looking onto Sauchiehall Street contained Trerons et Cie famed departmental store, Les Magasins des Tuileries, using all five levels.

Led, in the years just before WWI, by the Corporation and Bailie Michael Simons, who was also president of the Royal Glasgow Institute of the Fine Arts and chairman of theatre owners Howard & Wyndham Ltd, the Galleries were greatly extended and modernised, reaching Renfrew Street which is 24 feet higher than Sauchiehall Street. The enlarged public area then, and now, contains: a spacious semi-circular marble staircase which leads up to the art galleries floor on the level with Renfrew Street. This staircase opens up to the sculpture hall, from which access is made to the other rooms. There are in all eight galleries, four of which are 70 feet long and 42 to 32 feet wide, two at 42 feet square, and two 21 feet square. The space below houses a large hall accommodating 1,000 persons, two lesser halls, and ample cloakrooms, kitchens and a board-room. All were used for art exhibitions - including the first exhibitions of the Burrell Collection - trade shows, music and drama performances, meetings, functions and balls.

The galleries have been protected as a category B listed building since 1970. and continue to be owned by Glasgow City Council, with a public entrance corridor at street level facing Sauchiehall Street, and marble staircases up to the higher of the two levels.

In October 1986, the shop frontage building housing the Galleries was ravaged by fire, but they re-opened in 1990 as the largest quality, climate-controlled, temporary exhibition gallery in Scotland. They continue to be the largest exhibition space in the city-centre.

While Kelvingrove Art Gallery and Museum was closed for refurbishment between 2003 and 2006, the McLellan Galleries hosted a display of its best-loved works.

The McLellan Galleries were then leased to the Glasgow School of Art as studio and storage space in preparation for the planned redevelopment of the Glasgow School of Art campus.

Between 2012 and 2014, there was public discussion involving user organisations such as the Royal Glasgow Institute of the Fine Arts with a view to re-establishing the McLellan Galleries as a major feature in Glasgow’s cultural life. However, this did not occur and in 2018 the front offices and retail building was redeveloped into a work and office space for small businesses.

On 17 February 2026 the National Lottery Heritage Fund announced a major grant award to Glasgow Life to help re-open the McLellan Galleries for use by music, film and arts organisations.
