= Sarasota Assassination Society =

Organized crime group based in Manatee County, Florida

- Founded: 1884
- Founders: Alfred Bidwell; Leonard Andrews; Jason Alford
- Founding location: Bidwell-Wood House; Manatee County, Florida (Note: Present Sarasota County. This was before Sarasota County was formed by separating from Manatee County in 1921.)
- Years active: 1884–1892
- Territory: Manatee County, Florida
- Ethnicity: former Confederate soldiers
- Membership: 20-22
- Leaders: Alfred Bidwell; Leonard Andrews
- Criminal activities: Murder of political opponents, involvement in politics, blackmail

The Sarasota Assassination Society, also known as the Sarasota Vigilance Committee, was a late 19th-century secret organization established by Alfred Bidwell, Leonard Andrews, and Jason Alford in Manatee County, Florida. The organization, estimated to include 20 to 22 members, was purported to be a political social group or a Democratic Club. The true aims of the group were chronicled in the February 2, 1885, New York Times article; "This organization is supposed to exist for the secret murder of political opponents, and is composed of 20 members, bound together by terrible oaths to perform the bloody work of the band and to keep its secrets inviolate."

== Background ==
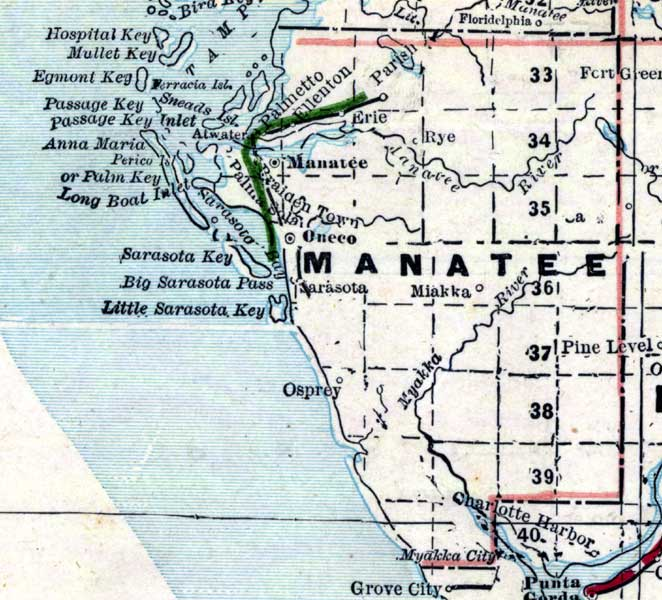
1889 map of Manatee County

The Sarasota Vigilance Committee actively recruited new members from the community and maintained control over their ranks through intimidation, fear, and coercion. Members were obligated to actively seek jury service in matters involving other members, assist in the escape of members who were incarcerated, and murder those individuals opposed by the group. The group was organized and created by a group of former Confederate soldiers. The group was led by Alfred Bidwell and Leonard Andrews, who referred to themselves as "judges," while members Jason Alford, "captain," Louis Cato and Charles Willard, "lieutenants," constituted the remaining command structure of the organization.

Notoriety for the Sarasota Vigilance Committee came with the murders of Charles E. Abbe and Harrison T. Riley. Abbe, who was painting the hull of an upturned boat with a friend, Charles Morehouse, was shot in the face with a double-barreled shotgun. Riley was ambushed while on horseback and shot in the head and body before having his throat slit. Though the murders occurred some six months apart, Riley's death was unsolved until the investigation of Charles Abbe's homicide.

Janet Snyder Matthews wrote an article, "He Has Carried His Life in His Hands," which argued against the group's claim that they had acted out of a fundamental belief that they were defending early settlers from the excesses of land speculators. Matthews cites Karl H. Grismer's book The Story of Sarasota as the source for this theory. Contrary to Grismer's supposition, Matthews reports that the murders of Abbe and Riley were almost certainly committed to personally benefit the leadership of the Sarasota Vigilance Committee. The ultimate purpose of the organization was to plan and carry out the murders of five of Manatee County's most notable and important figures: Charles E. Abbe, Harrison T. Riley, Robert Greer, Furman Whitaker, and Stephen Goings.

In total, nine members of the Sarasota Vigilance Committee were indicted for the murders of Charles E. Abbe and Harrison T. Riley. The indictments led to the trials of eight men, with three being sentenced to death, four receiving life sentences, and one being acquitted. Two of those sentenced to death later escaped from prison, and the remaining one had his death sentence commuted to life in prison.

== Murders ==
=== Charles E. Abbe ===
In 1877, Charles Elliot Abbe, his wife, Charlotte, and their two teenage daughters, Carrie and Nellie, moved to Manatee County, Florida, from Chicago. Abbe had made a fortune as a salesman with the Singer Sewing Machine Company in Kansas. Abbe became enthralled with the possibility of commercial success in Manatee County after vacationing there for the previous two years. Manatee County spanned from the Gulf of Mexico to Lake Okeechobee and from the Manatee River to Charlotte Harbor.

Between 1876 and 1878, Abbe purchased 359 acres (145 ha) of land for $1/acre (equivalent to $27 in 2025), in which 120 acres (49 ha) were modern-day Sarasota, including its waterfront. In addition to land acquisition, Abbe maintained a general store in the family's home and served as the area's first postmaster. He was appointed on August 16, 1878, and later appointed U.S. Commissioner to the circuit and district courts. Abbe marketed Manatee County in his travels around the North, especially at local fairs and exhibitions, seeking to promote settlement in the area. An active local politician and newspaper contributor, Abbe was one of the county's 216 registered Republicans. With the marriage of their daughter Nellie to neighbor Furman Whitaker, the Abbes were solidifying their place in the community.

As Abbe's success and fortune grew, so did the resentment and animosity felt by Alfred Bidwell and other members of the small rural community. The Bidwells were also neighbors to the Abbes. Instances of vandalism to the Abbe's properties increased in the two years before his murder. The harassment eventually turned violent, with gunfire being directed at the Abbe residence while Mrs. Abbe was home alone. Mrs. Abbe also reported finding a dirk knife stuck in a table outside of her residence.

On December 27, 1884, Charles Abbe and his friend, Charles Morehouse, were painting a boat on a road leading to the beach, when Charles Willard and Joseph Anderson approached them. Willard, who was wielding Anderson's double-barreled shotgun, pointed the firearm at Abbe and shot him in the face. He then turned and pointed the shotgun at Morehouse, ordering him to run for his life. Willard and Anderson dragged Abbe's lifeless body to a wharf near Bidwell's store, loaded it on a boat, and dumped it in the Gulf of Mexico, approximately three miles (4.8 km) offshore.

=== Harrison T. "Tip" Riley ===
Days after the murder of Charles Abbe, a man named Henry H. Hawkins came forward to authorities with information about the uninvestigated murder of Harrison T. "Tip" Riley, as well as the structure of the Sarasota Vigilance Committee.

Early on, Judge Andrews identified Riley as a threat or nuisance to the group and gave the order to have him executed. Under threat of death if they failed, new vigilantes, "Coop" Brown and his brother, Miles, along with Tom Drymon, were ordered to murder Riley. Miles Brown became ill before the murder and missed the rendezvous.

On the morning of June 30, 1884, Riley left the Myakka settlement, en route for the post office in Sarasota. Tom Drymon, Edmund Bacon, and Louis Cato were waiting to apprehend him. (Note: The location was present-day Proctor and Sawyer Road.) The trio was armed with Alfred Bidwell's double-barrel shotgun and Leonard Andrews' muzzleloader. As Riley rode past, all three fired, causing him to fall to the ground. Severely wounded from the first volley, Riley was shot several more times, but was subsequently able to pull himself up to his knees. This prompted Cato to pull out his knife and dispatch Riley by cutting his throat.

Riley's questionable reputation resulted in his murder not being investigated at the time of his death.

== Manhunt and arrest ==
Just hours after Abbe's murder, Sheriff A.S. "Sandy" Watson was alerted to the incident and responded expeditiously to the crime scene. Arriving after nightfall, Sheriff Watson conducted interviews with Charles Morehouse and other witnesses and performed a preliminary search of the crime scene, locating Abbe's pistol and knife at the shoreline near a prominent blood trail.

Resuming the investigation in the morning light, Sheriff Watson surveyed the bloody scene and located footprints that were subsequently identified as uniquely belonging to Edmund Bacon. Additionally, witnesses reported overhearing the misfiring blasts of a shotgun belonging to Joseph Anderson at the time of Abbe's murder. Though Abbe's body was not present, there was a significant amount of physical evidence to support the testimony of witnesses.

Warrants were issued for Charles Willard, Joseph Anderson and sons, Edmund Bacon, Alfred Bidwell, Adam Hunter, his wife, Virginia Hunter, and their son, Emmett Hunter. A posse consisting of 26 men set out in search of Abbe's body and his murderers. All of the suspects were subsequently located and arrested, except for Charles Willard, who evaded capture for several days. Willard, hungry and exhausted, finally surrendered himself to a man named Sheppard at his camp in Myakka for a meal. Some of the conspirators were released and then subsequently, rearrested, in the days following the Abbe's murder.

In an effort to protect his captives from angry residents, Sheriff Watson was forced to transfer the prisoners from Manatee to the jail located at the county seat, Pine Level (modern day Desoto County). While en route to the jail, Alfred Bidwell attempted suicide by overdosing on morphine.

== Trials and punishment ==
Charles Willard and Joseph Anderson were found guilty of first degree murder and sentenced to life in prison for their roles in the murder of Charles Abbe. Edmund Bacon was acquitted for Abbe's murder, but found guilty of first degree murder as it related to Harrison Riley. Adam Hunter was found not guilty. In their roles as accessories before the fact, Judges Alfred Bidwell and Leonard Andrews were both found guilty of first degree murder. Bacon, Bidwell, and Andrews were sentenced to death. Tom Dryman and Louis Cato cooperated with authorities and became witnesses for the state against other members of the organization. Dryman, though convicted for his role in Riley's murder, was pardoned as a result of numerous pleas from the citizenry of Manatee County. Andrews and Bacon secured firearms and escaped from prison after incarcerated for a year. Bidwell's death sentence was commuted to life in prison, and he joined fellow vigilantes, Willard and Anderson, as a lease-labor convict in the labor camp in Live Oak, Florida. In 1889, Jason Alford was granted a severance from the court. Dryman's pardon prompted an outpouring of petitions on behalf of the remaining members of the Sarasota Vigilance Committee, and the last inmate was released from prison in 1892.
