= Daniel McLellan =

Australian surf lifesaver

Daniel McLellan is a surf swimmer and life saving competitor who represented Australia on nine occasions during the 1990s. He has won numerous Australian titles and has saved many unexpected lives over his years of profession and non professional Surf Life Saving Australia) participation and competed in Kellogg's Surf League. He also represented Australia at the World Life Saving Championships and World Interclub Championships (now called RESCUE).

He attempted high level pool swimming, placing fifth in the 1992 Olympic trials in the 200 m backstroke and third in the 400 m freestyle at the 1993 Australian swimming titles. After retiring in 2000 due to two shoulder operations he successfully made a comeback in 2007.

He was awarded a part scholarship from the Australian Institute of Sport (AIS) in the early 1990s, as he won either the open men's surf race or run-swim-run from 1992 to 1998 at the world championships. He is also the current world record holder for the Waikiki rough water swim. which he has held since 1995. He has worked as a swim coach in Sydney and Melbourne, Australia.
