= MacLellan's Castle =

Castle in Kirkcudbright, Scotland

Coordinates: 54.8370°N 4.0530°W

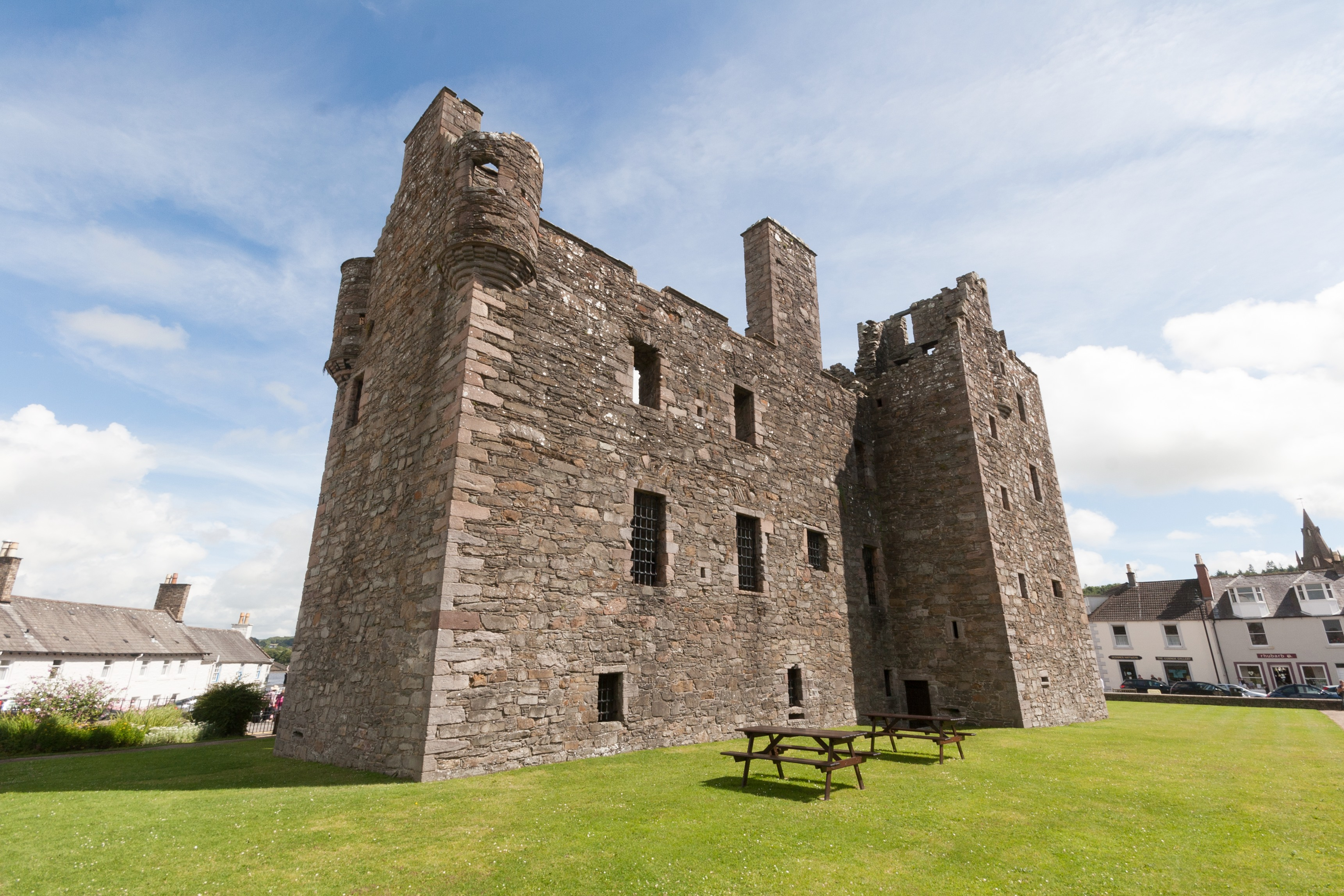
MacLellan's Castle

MacLellan's Castle in the town of Kirkcudbright, in Galloway, Scotland, was built in the late 16th century. It stands in the centre of Kirkcudbright, on the south side of the River Dee which flows into the Solway Firth. The L-plan castle was the residence of the MacLellan family from whom it derived its name. The family sold the castle in 1752, and from 1782 to 1912 it was held by the Earls of Selkirk. Today, the site is in the care of Historic Environment Scotland.

== History ==
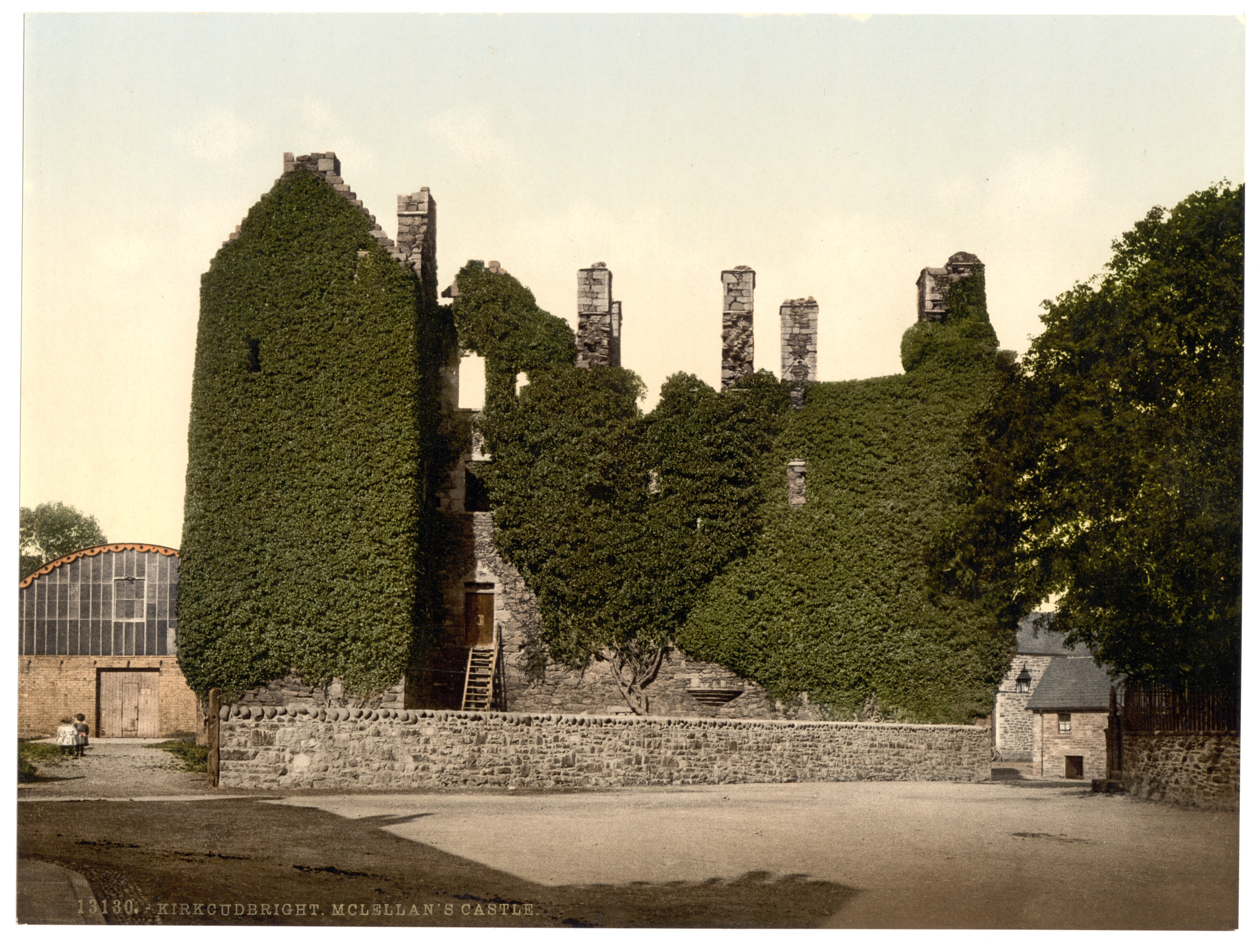
MacLellan's Castle was covered in ivy in the 19th century.

In 1569 Thomas MacLellan of Bombie was given the site of a ruined Greyfriars monastery in the town of Kirkcudbright. The monastery, which was built in around 1455, was demolished leaving only its chapel and on the site an L-plan castle was built. The chapel is now called Greyfriars Church. Construction of MacLellan's Castle began around 1577, instigated by Thomas. The work is commonly assumed to date to 1582 based on the year being carved into a stone panel above the entrance. Despite never being finished in its entirety, it was home to MacLellan's descendants until 1752 when it was sold to Sir Robert Maxwell. By this time the castle was in a state of ruin and the roof had collapsed. Thirty years later, Maxwell sold MacLellan Castle to Dunbar Douglas, 4th Earl of Selkirk.

In MacGibbon and Ross' 1887 work, The Castellated and Domestic Architecture of Scotland, the authors remarked "the whole building is a mass of ivy, giving it the appearance of a huge haystack, of a green rather than yellow colour", however they were of the opinion that aside from the roof the building was in good condition. The Royal Commission on the Ancient and Historical Monuments of Scotland was created in 1908 to preserve Scotland's historic buildings. Several buildings were already under state care, and as part of this growing concern to preserve standing buildings twenty buildings (eight of them castles) were taken into state care between 1911 and 1913. MacLellan's Castle counted among these – it was handed over to the state in 1912 – and is now under the guardianship of Historic Environment Scotland.

== Architecture ==
MacLellan's Castle is laid out in an L-plan, consisting of two wings meeting at right angles. This type of tower house is typical of Scottish architecture and often dates from 1540–1680. One wing runs north–south and the other east–west; they meet in the southwest corner. The simple 'L' shape is embellished with an additional tower attached to the southwest corner, and projections on the inner angle where the two wings meet. The four-storey castle has a kitchen on the ground floor and a great hall on the first for entertaining guests. The upper floors most likely provided accommodation. Behind the fireplace in the great hall is a peephole and on the other side is a small room dubbed the "Laird's Lug" where the conversations in the hall could be overheard. This was not an uncommon feature in Scottish tower houses.

The castle was entered at the inner angle where the two wings join. On the exterior, above the doorway, is a panel divided into three parts. The two lower parts are carved two coats of arms: those of Thomas MacLellan, for whom the castle was built, and his wife, G. Maxwell.

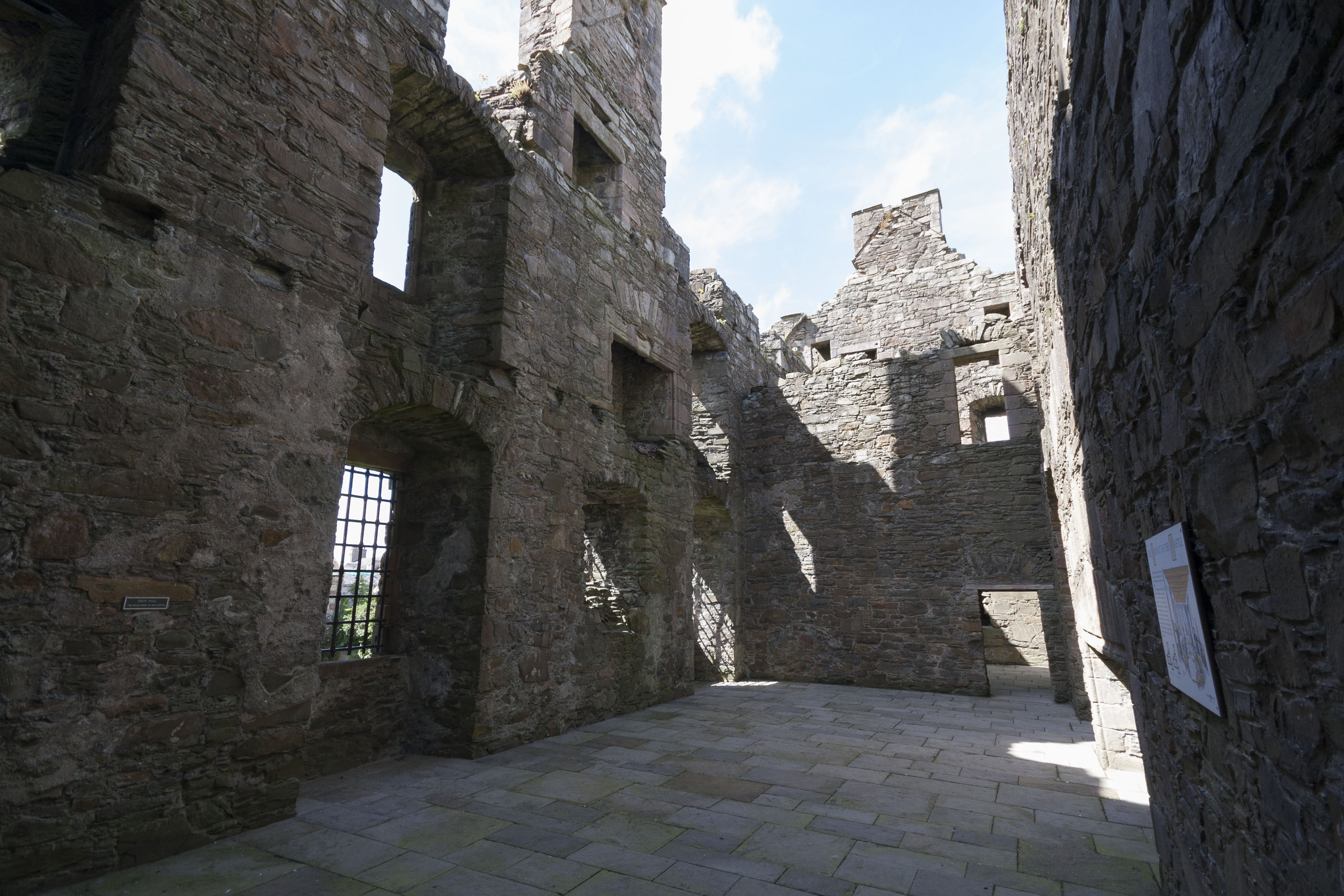
The great hall looking towards the north end

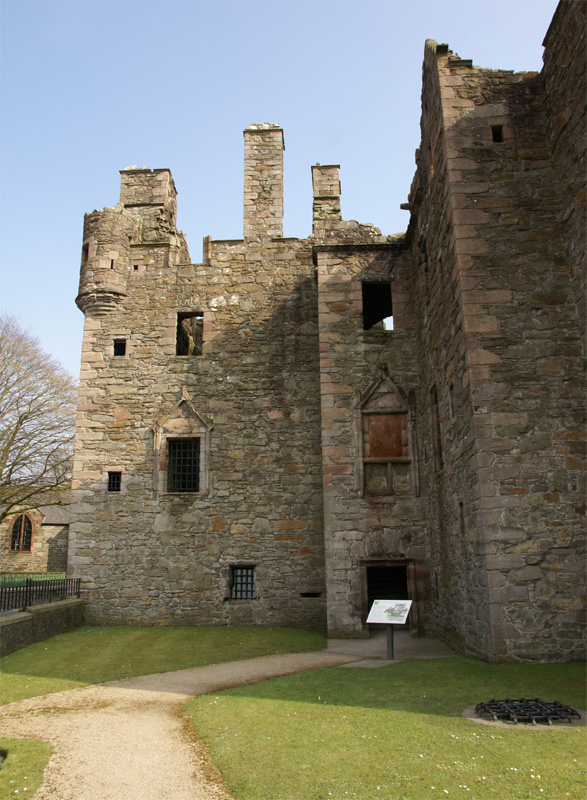
The entrance in the corner angle between the two wings

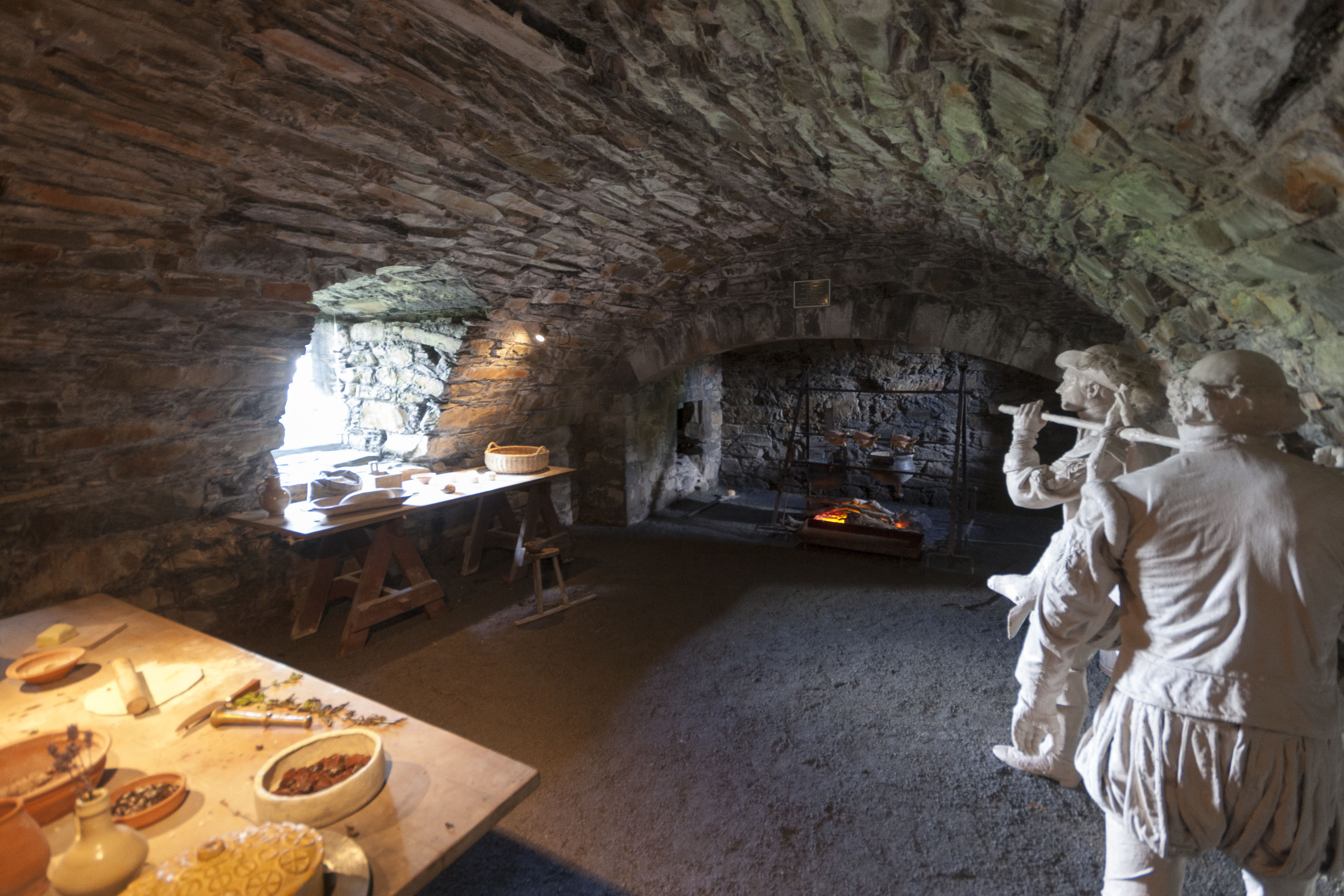
The kitchens in the east part of the south wing

== See also ==
- Robert Maclellan, 1st Lord Kirkcudbright – Thomas MacLellan's son
