= David McLellan (Ontario politician) =

David McLellan (January 11, 1841 – March 16, 1892) was mayor of Hamilton, Ontario from 1890 to 1891.

He was born in Toronto, the son of Malcolm McLellan and Agnes Bennett, both natives of Scotland. McLellan was educated there and worked in Toronto for four years before moving to Buffalo and then Louisville, Kentucky. He married Elizabeth Dittey in 1864. He returned to Canada in 1861 and found work with Robert H. Gray, going on to become a partner in the business. McLellan went to Hamilton to open a new branch office in 1871. In 1877, he became an agent for the Royal Insurance Company of England. McLellan was named a justice of the peace for Wentworth County in 1883. He was also a prominent member of the Masonic lodge. McLellan died suddenly in Hamilton at the age of 51.
