= Katherine Elizabeth McClellan =

American photographer

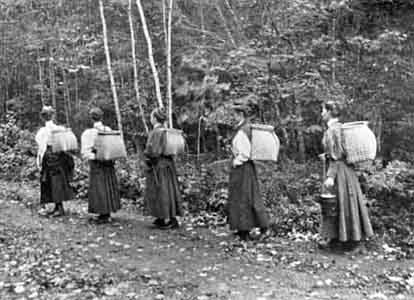
Women in the Adirondacks, photo by Katherine Elizabeth McClellan, 1898

Katherine Elizabeth McClellan (1859 – September 14, 1934) was a professional photographer working mainly in Upstate New York and Western Massachusetts from 1892 to 1918. In 1912 she was given the title "Official Photographer of Smith College".

== Early life and education ==
McClellan was born and raised in Paterson, New Jersey. Her father was a wealthy physician. After graduating from Smith College in 1882 she worked for eight years in private schools and as a tutor in New York and New Jersey, then moved to Saranac Lake, New York. In 1892, McClellan took up photography as a hobby and later pursued it as a profession.

== Career ==
In addition to selling her photographs while in Saranac Lake, McClellan also published two viewbooks: John Brown, or A Hero's Grave in the Adirondacks (1896) and Keene Valley: In the Heart of the Mountain (1898) (references below). She announced in the latter book two more, one on Saranac Lake and the other on Lake Placid, but they never appeared.

In 1903 McClellan started spending part of the year in Northampton, Massachusetts. She opened a studio on State Street and announced in the Smith College Monthly magazine that she "was reading to take all order for photographs". A large share of her business came from the college. She was hired to make photographs to illustrate college publications and newspaper and magazine articles. The College also called on her to document physical changes on campus. Her views of buildings, classrooms, the campus, and special events highlighted the College's facilities while presenting a dignified image of education and life at Smith. In 1912 she was given the title "Official Photographer of Smith College".

McClellan also produced for the Smith College yearbook portraits of students and faculty, and group photographs of club members and house residents. She also documented the activities and events of college life such as dances, proms, and dramatic productions. In addition to her work for the College she also took portraits of local people, visiting dignitaries such as Helen Keller, Julia Ward Howe, and Henry James. She also took images of local townspeople.

In 1918, at the age of 59, McClellan retired to Sarasota, Florida. She and her sister, Daisietta McClellan, developed a tract of land known as McClellan Park, and McClellan continued to make photographs of the Florida landscape and its people. On her move to Florida, McClellan sold her studio to her collaborator of ten years, Eric Stahlberg. He continued to shoot images for the College through the late 1940s and sold her images, negatives, and films to the College in 1958.

== Death ==
Katherine McClellan died in Sarasota, Florida, on September 14, 1934.

== Publications ==
- McClellan, Katherine Elizabeth (1896). A Hero's Grave in the Adirondacks. Saranac Lake, New York: The author.
- McClellan, Katherine Elizabeth (1898). Keene Valley "In the Heart of the Mountains". Saranac Lake, New York: The author.

== Archival material ==
The Katherine Elizabeth McClellan Papers were donated to Smith College Special Collections by McClellan in 1918 and were added to over time by various donors.
