= William Maclellan (knight) =

Sir William MacLellan, son of Patrick MacLellan of Bombie and Margaret Of Lennox was the Husband of Lady Marion Carlyle.

When his father was murdered in 1452, William and other members of his clan took revenge by ransacking land owned by William Douglas, 8th Earl of Douglas but their plundering and defiance of the law was punished by King James II. As a result of their actions, the estate of Bombie was taken from the Maclellan clan and annexed by the crown. The Maclellans, despite their grievance over the taking of the estate, remained faithful to the king during this time. As a result, they were among the beneficiaries of the redistribution of wealth and titles and would receive key positions in the years that would follow.

William is best known for dispatching Black Morrow, sometimes referred to as Black Murray, an outlaw who was terrorizing the area. That prompted James II of Scotland to promise the Barony to Kirkcudbright to the Maclellan family should William capture the man’s body, dead or alive.

Hoping to restore honor and favor to their clan. William gathered his followers and defeated the band of marauders, carrying the beheaded head of their leader Black Murray on the end of his sword to King James to prove the success of what was asked. The King in his delight commended William for his deed but whether purposely or not forgot to mention the reward that was promised.

Enraged, William took off his gauntlet and threw it at the King’s feet. Shaking his fist, he beseeched the king to "Think on!" and not to forget his proclamation. Subsequently, William Maclellan was knighted, the borough of Kirkcudbright was made Royal Burgh, and Sir William became its first Provost.

The crest which the new provost was an erect right arm grasping a dagger, on the point of which was Black Morrow's head. The motto of the MacLellan Clan has forevermore been "Think On!"

He would later serve the Kings successor James III of Scotland.

== See also ==
Clan MacLellan
