= William Walker McLellan =

American businessman

William Walker McLellan (1873–April 11, 1960) was born in Glasgow, Scotland. He came to the United States at the end of the nineteenth century and began working at a department store in Newark, New Jersey. He became a manager of the first S. H. Kress store in Memphis, Tennessee, and then joined McCrory Stores as a vice president. In 1917 he founded McLellan Stores, a chain of five and dimes, which grew to 200 stores by 1933. He lost control of the company during the Great Depression to United Stores Corporation and left soon thereafter. He then founded the W. W. Mac Company, a chain that he built to 70 stores at the time of his death. His wife was Margueritta S. McLellan, who died in 1954.

His McLellan Stores merged with McCrory Stores in 1958.
