= Thomas Maclellan of Bombie =

Sir Thomas Maclellan
- Died: 1597
- Occupation: Provost of Kirkcudbright
- Known for: Construction of MacLellan's Castle
- Children: Robert Maclellan, 1st Lord Kirkcudbright

Sir Thomas Maclellan (died 1597) was Provost of Kirkcudbright and father of Robert Maclellan, 1st Lord Kirkcudbright. He was responsible for the construction of MacLellan's Castle in the town.

He was appointed as a gentleman in the bedchamber of James VI in October 1580.

During his illness in June 1597, Maclellan travelled to Bath, Somerset in England to seek a cure. He wrote to William Cecil, 1st Baron Burghley asking permission to send things he had bought for his house in Kirkcubright by sea from London. Physicians in Bath told him there was no cure for his "tympanicall hydropsie".
