= Clan MacLellan =

Lowland Scottish clan

- Mac-a-ghille-dhiolan
- Motto: Think On; Sapit Qui Reputat; Superba Frango

Profile
- Region: Galloway
- Clan MacLellan no longer has a chief, and is an armigerous clan
- The 10th Lord Kirkcudbright
- Historic seat: MacLellan's Castle
- Last Chief: The Rt. Hon. Camden Gray Maclellan
- Died: 1832
Septs of Clan MacLellan
Cannon of Killochy
Donaldson
MacCane
Clan branches
Bardrockwood
Barscobe
Barholm
Bombie
Borgue
Colvend
Gelston
Glenshinnoch
Kilcruikie
Kirkconnel
Kirkcormick
Kirkgunzeon
Ravenston
Sorbie
Troquhain
Allied clans
Clan Stewart
Rival clans
Clan Douglas

The Clan MacLellan is a Scottish clan of the Scottish Lowlands. As the clan does not currently have a chief it is considered an Armigerous clan.

== History ==
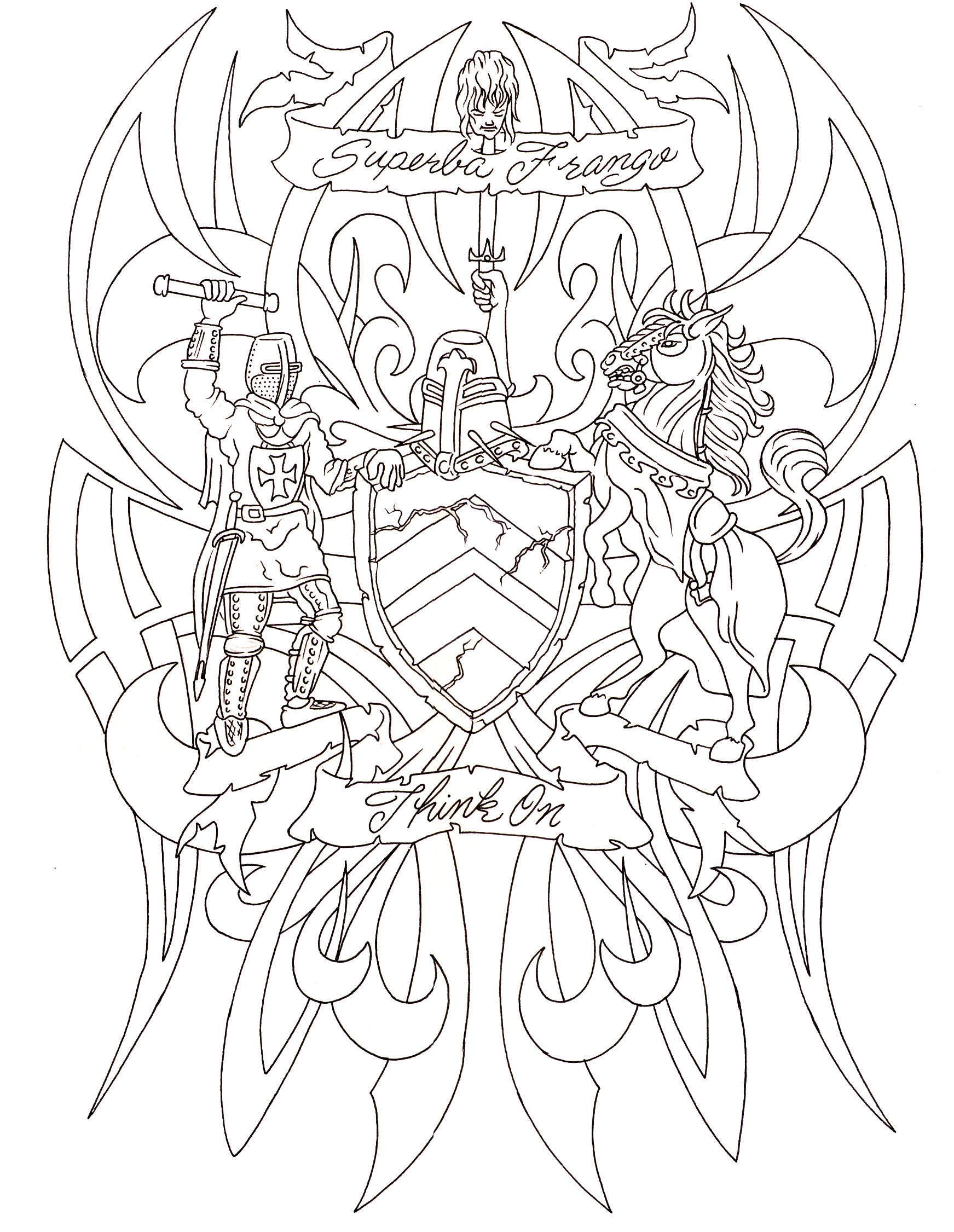
The private coat of arms of Lord Kirkcudbright, the last Chief of the Name and Arms of MacLellan. arms – argent two chevrons Sable; crest – a naked cubit arm, supporting upon the point of a sword, erect, a moor's head, all ppr.; supporters – Dexter: a chevalier in complete armour, holding in his right hand a baton, all ppr.; Sinister: a horse argent furnished gules; Mottoes – Think on; and Superba frango

=== Origins ===
The name MacLellan is derived from Mac-a-ghille-dhiolan which means son of the bastard, and appears originally in the 1273 charter for Sweetheart Abbey as McGillolane. The leadership of the clan can be traced back to Cane McGillolane, a knight in the service of John Balliol in the later 13th century. Cane was the son of Thomas of Galloway, who was the illegitimate son of Alan of Galloway. Cane's son, Donald Mac Cane (The Lord Donald) resided on Threave Island until he was removed by Edward Bruce who then replaced him as the Lord of Galloway. Eventually the Black Douglas, was made Lord of Galloway igniting a feud with MacLellans that lasted for well over a century. Threave Island was a residence for the prior Lords of Galloway, including Fergus and Cane's grandfather, Alan. Donald's son, Gillebertus MacLelan Galvediensis was Captain of Clenconnan and was Bishop of Sodor and Man. Lord Gilbert's brother was Cuthbert of Galloway.

=== Wars of Scottish Independence ===
During the Wars of Scottish Independence, McGillolanes backed their cousin John Balliol. In 1305, Patrick M'Lolan was recorded capturing Dumfries Castle from The Bruce. After Balliol was deposed at the hands of Edward I, MacLellans still opposed Bruce, helping to re-capture Dumfries Castle following the murder of the rival claimant Sir John Comyn. With Balliol ascended to the throne of Scotland, M'Lolanes could take their rightful place as Lords of Galloway. Under Robert the Bruce, that title would fall first to his brother Edward Bruce and eventually to the Black Douglas.

=== 15th century and clan conflicts ===
After maintaining forlorn support for the house of Baliol into the early-fourteenth century, the MacLellans were ushered back into service of the Scottish crown when Master Gilbert of Galloway became clerk to King Robert and was appointed as Archdeacon of Galloway. Gilbert MacLelan would eventually become Bishop of Sodor and Mann. So successful was MacLellan's reintegration that during the early 15th century there were reputedly no fewer than fourteen knights in Galloway of the name MacLellan. One of these, Sir Alexander MacLellan was cited by the 16th-century historian David Hume of Godscroft (drawing on the monastic Book of Pluscarden) as the Scotsman who slew the duke of Clarence while fighting in French service at the Battle of Baugé in 1421. In 1451, The Tutor of Bomby, Sir Patrick Maclellan, Sheriff of Galloway clashed repeatedly with William Douglas, 8th Earl of Douglas over outbreaks of lawlessness committed by the earl's retainers. These conflicts culminated when MacLellan rejected Douglas's appeal to join an aristocratic conspiracy against King James II. Douglas captured the sheriff and imprisoned him in Threave Castle. MacLellan's uncle, Sir Andrew Gray of Foulis held high royal office and sent his son, Sir Patrick Gray, into Galloway, with letters from the crown ordering Douglas to release his prisoner. However, Douglas had MacLellan murdered when presented with the royal warrant, whilst he entertained his guest at dinner. Patrick Gray escaped from the castle, and his vow of revenge was realised in brutal form when he stood at the forefront of the loyalist nobles who assassinated the earl of Douglas in front of the king at Stirling in February 1452. Local tradition holds that the MacLellans themselves used the celebrated Scottish cannon Mons Meg to batter down Threave Castle in retribution for the murder of their chief. The MacLellan's use of the Mons Meg cannon against Douglas became symbolised in an additional crest with a mortar piece and the motto Superba frango which translates to I humble proud things.

As the feud escalated n the following generation, the MacLellan estates were forfeited after repeated raids on the Kirkcudbrightshire lands of the Clan Douglas. However, James II restored the family to their lands when Sir William MacLellan, son of Sir Patrick captured the leader of a band of gypsies who had been terrorising the district. William carried the head of the brigand to the king on the point of his sword. The story is one explanation for the MacLellan clan crest; however, a Moor's head has also been considered as an allusion to the Crusades or potentially connected to the similar, prior Lords of Bomby's crest, The Adairs. These events established the MacLellans as a bastion of support for the Stewart crown in a region prone to lawlessness and aristocratic powerplay. Their affiliation was confirmed in 1488 when Sir Thomas MacLellan supported James III against the rebellion that ended in the death of the king after the Battle of Sauchieburn. With most of the magnates of the south-west and the borders fighting in support of the insurrection, MacLellan's residence was burned to the ground after the monarch's defeat.

=== 16th century and Anglo-Scottish Wars ===
The family suffered severely during the Anglo-Scottish Wars of the reigns of James IV and James V of Scotland. Sir William Maclellan of Bombie was knighted by King James IV but was killed at the Battle of Flodden in 1513 fighting for the king. William's son, Thomas, was killed in Edinburgh at the door of St Giles' Cathedral by Gordon of Lochinvar in 1526. Thomas's younger brother, William Maclellan of Nunton presided over the family as Tutor of Bombie while Thomas's son was in infancy, and mobilised the successful defence of Kirkcudbright against English besiegers in 1547. The younger Thomas Maclellan was killed in the same year at the Battle of Pinkie. In the following generation, Sir Thomas Maclellan of Bombie fought for Mary, Queen of Scots at the Battle of Langside, and prospered subsequently under her son James VI. He served as Gentleman of the Bedchamber to the king, and as provost of Kirkcudbright, constructing MacLellan's Castle as a fashionable gentleman's residence overseeing the town.

=== 17th century and Civil War ===
Sir Robert MacLellan was a courtier both to James VI and Charles I. In 1633 he was raised to the peerage as Lord Kirkcudbright. During the Scottish Civil War the third Lord was such a zealous royalist that he incurred enormous debts in the king’s cause. As a result, the estates were completely ruined.

=== 18th to 19th centuries ===
There were two claimants to the chief's title at the beginning of the 18th century and the dispute was finally settled by the House of Lords in 1761. However, the title became dormant again when the tenth Lord died in Bruges in 1832.

== Castle ==
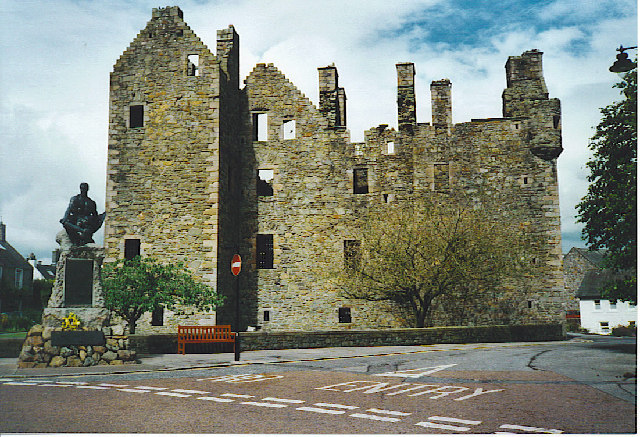
MacLellan's Castle

MacLellan's Castle, found in Kirkcudbright in south-west Scotland was the seat of the chief of Clan MacLellan. The castle's beginnings lie in the Reformation of 1560 which led to the abandonment of the Convent of Greyfriars which had stood on the site since 1449. The materials used to build the castle were taken from Lochfergus in Bomby in 1582 from a castle previously owned by the Lords of Galloway and where John M'Lelan of Lochfergus is mentioned in 1448.

== Hebridean MacLellans ==
There are concentrations of MacLellans found in the Western Isles on Uist. The surname borne by these MacLellans is represented by the Gaelic Mac Gille Fhialain, instead of the usual form Mac Gille Fhaolain borne by other MacLellans. (Note: Other forms of the Gaelic surname borne by the Uist MacLellans include: Mac 'ill' Fhialain and MacIllFhialain.) The Uist MacLellans were once known collectively as Na Faolanaich. The North Uist MacLellans are also known as Clann Iain Mhóir, after Iain Mór (John Mor MacLellan), a 17th-century ancestor. It is possible that this family descends from the South Uist MacLellans who migrated to North Uist.

== See also ==
- Black Morrow, traditional story of the crest used in MacLellan heraldry
- Moor's head, the head of a Moor used in heraldry
