= Robert Trotter (physician) =

Scottish physician and writer

Robert Trotter (1798 - 21 June 1875) was a medical doctor, antiquarian and collector of Galloway folklore and history. He was the son of Grizel Stevenson and Robert Trotter 'the Muir Doctor' and sister of the writer Isabella Trotter. His sons Robert de Bruce Trotter, Alexander Trotter and James Trotter were all physicians and writers.

At age fifteen, following his father's death, he began teaching at New Galloway parish school and subsequently worked as a family tutor. He lived in Auchencairn between 1835 and 1853, working as a physician. In 1853 he was appointed as parish medical officer in Kintyre and latterly moved to a similar role in Skye. He returned to the Glenkens in 1864 to act as the parish medical officer for Dalry.

In addition to his novels, he contributed several 'Glenkens Anecdotes' to Swans' Dumfries Magazine, poetry and tales to the Castle-Douglas Miscellany and was a frequent contributor to The Galloway Gazette.

Trotter collected antiquities from his youth and amassed an important collection of artefacts and relics. He regretted that there was no Galloway Antiquarian Museum to which he could leave his collection.

Joseph Heughan, the blacksmith poet, published a Scots poem in The Galloway Gazette in commemoration of Trotter following his death.

== Works ==
- Lowran Castle, Or The Wild Boar of Curridoo: With Other Tales, Illustrative of the Superstitions, Manners, and Customers of Galloway (1822)
- Derwentwater; Or, the Adherents of King James. A Tale of the First Rebellion (1825)
- Herbert Herries, Or, The Days of Queen Mary: A Tale of Dundrennan Abbey (1827)
