= Joseph Heughan =

Blacksmith and poet (1837–1902)

Joseph Heughan (1 January 1837 - 18 June 1902) was a blacksmith and poet from Auchencairn, Dumfries and Galloway. He lived in Auchencairn his whole life and did not publish his poems beyond a small number submitted to local periodicals (for example Tributum ad Memoriam Roberti Trotteri); despite this his work was highly respected and well known locally. No collection of his work has been published but samples can be found in Harper's The Bards of Galloway, Alexander Trotter's East Galloway Sketches, an article in the 1901 volume of The Gallovidian and a more recent publication by the Auchencairn History Society. His style is marked by the heavy use of Galloway Scots words, many of which were archaic at the time of writing, and dense Biblical and classical allusions.
