= Isabella Trotter =

Scottish writer

Isabella Trotter (1796-1847) was a teacher, governess and writer from Galloway. She was the daughter of Grizel Stevenson and Robert Trotter 'the Muir Doctor'. She was the sister of Robert Trotter, who along with his sons Robert de Bruce Trotter, Alexander Trotter, and James Trotter, recorded the folklore and local history of Galloway. Isabella was the only woman in the family to write.

== Works ==
- Memoirs of the Late Robert Trotter, Esq., Surgeon, New Galloway (1822)
- The Four Glenkens' Ministers, in The Dumfries Monthly Magazine (December 1826); reprinted in John Nicholson's Historical and Traditional Tales in Prose and Verse: Connected with the South of Scotland (1843: pp. 388-394)
