= Alexander Trotter =

Alexander Trotter may refer to:

- Alex Trotter (1893–1948), English footballer
- Alexander Trotter (physician) (1835–1901), Scottish physician and author
