= Scottish baronial architecture =

19th-century architectural style

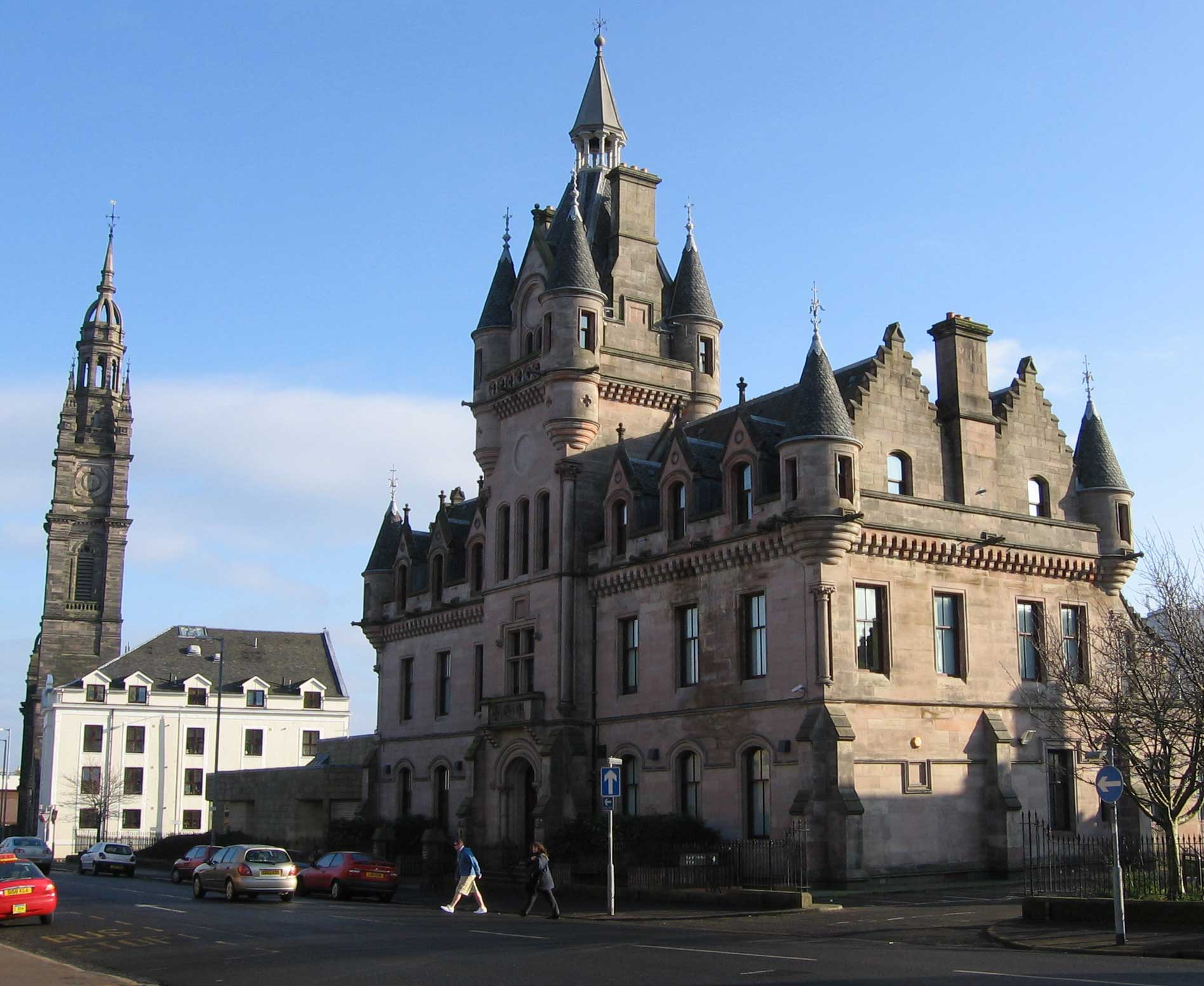
The sheriff court in Greenock (1869) is a typical Scottish Baronial building with crow-stepped gables and corbelled corner turrets.

Scottish baronial or Scots baronial is an architectural style of 19th-century Gothic Revival which revived the forms and ornaments of historical architecture of Scotland in the Late Middle Ages and the early modern period. Reminiscent of Scottish castles, buildings in the Scots baronial style are characterised by elaborate rooflines embellished with conical roofs, tourelles, and battlements with machicolations, often with an asymmetric plan.

Popular during the fashion for Romanticism and the Picturesque, Scots baronial architecture was equivalent to the Jacobethan Revival of 19th-century England, and likewise revived the Late Gothic appearance of the fortified domestic architecture of the elites in the Late Middle Ages and the architecture of the Jacobean era.

Among architects of the Scots baronial style in the Victorian era were William Burn and David Bryce. Romanticism in Scotland coincided with the development of Scottish national identity during the 19th century, and some of the most emblematic country residences of 19th-century Scotland were built in the style, including Queen Victoria's Balmoral Castle and Walter Scott's Abbotsford. In an urban setting, Cockburn Street, Edinburgh was built wholly in baronial style. Baronial style buildings were typically of stone, whether ashlar or masonry.

Following Robert William Billings's Baronial and Ecclesiastical Antiquities of Scotland, architectural historians identified the stylistic features characteristic of the baronial castles built from the latter 16th century as Scots baronial style, which as a revived idiom architects continued to employ up until 1930s. Scottish baronial was core influence on Charles Rennie Mackintosh's Modern Style architecture. The style was considered a British national idiom emblematic of Scotland, and was widely used for public buildings, country houses, residences and follies throughout the British Empire. The Scottish National War Memorial, opened in 1927 in Edinburgh Castle, was the last significant building in the baronial style.

== Revival and Name ==
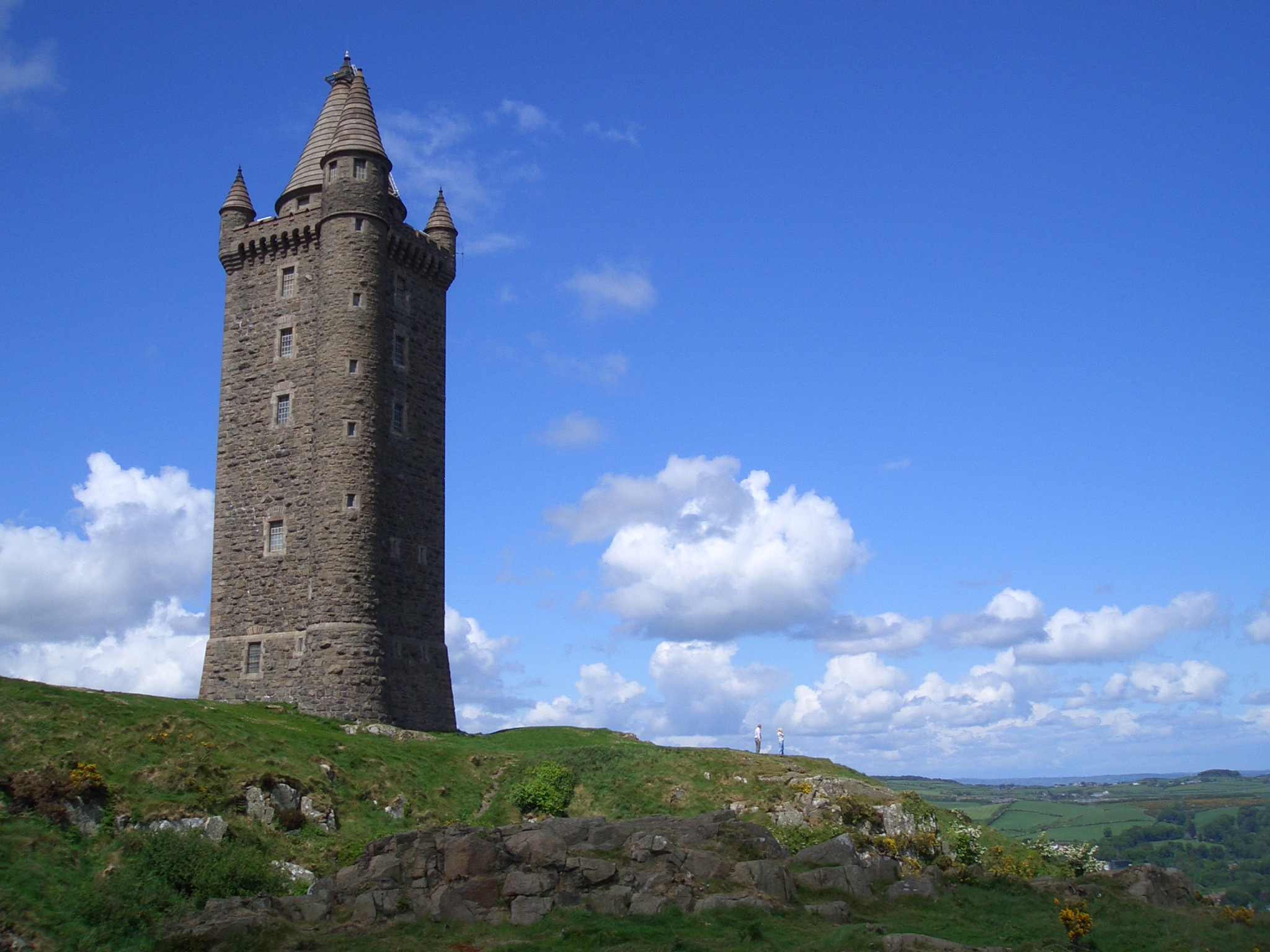
Scrabo Tower, a folly in Newtownards, County Down, by architects Lanyon and Lynn (1858)

The Scottish baronial style is also called Scotch baronial, Scots baronial or, merely, baronial style. The name was coined in the 19th century and may come from Robert William Billings's 1852 book, Baronial and Ecclesiastical Antiquities of Scotland. Before that, the style does not seem to have had a name. The buildings constructed during the Scottish baronial revival by far outnumber those of the original Scottish "baronial" castles of the early modern period.

== Predecessors ==
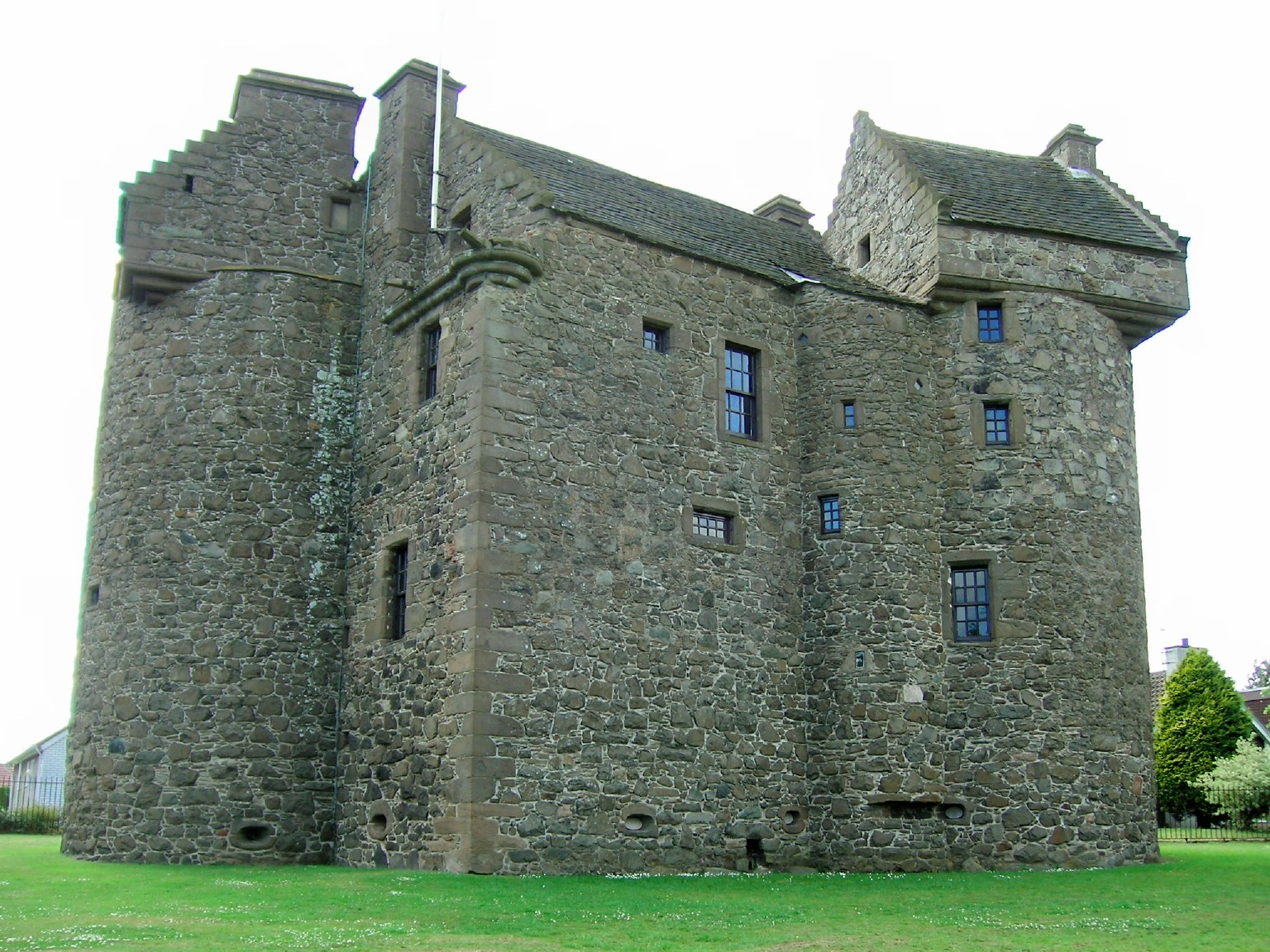
Claypotts Castle consists of a rectangular central block with two round towers crowned by square garret chambers. The corners of these chambers or cap-houses are strongly corbelled out over the round form and have crow-stepped gables.

Scottish baronial style drew upon the buildings of the Scottish Renaissance. The style of elite residences built by barons in Scotland developed under the influence of French architecture and the architecture of the County of Flanders in the 16th century, which had been abandoned by about 1660. The style kept many of the features of the high-rising medieval Gothic castles but introduced Renaissance features.

High and relatively thin-walled medieval fortifications had been made obsolete by gunpowder weapons but were associated with chivalry and the landed nobility. High roofs, towers and turrets were kept for status reasons, and Renaissance elements were introduced. That mainly involved making the windows larger, with straight lintels or round bows, and typically lacking mullions. The style drew on tower houses and peel towers, retaining many of their external features. French Renaissance style also retained the steep roofs of medieval castles, as can be seen at Azay-le-Rideau (1518), for example, and the original Scottish baronial style might have been influenced by French masons brought to Scotland to work on royal palaces.

Scottish baronial style was quite limited in scope, being mainly for lesser Scottish landlords. The walls of the buildings are usually rubble work, and only quoins, window dressings and copings are in ashlar. Sculpted ornaments are sparsely used. In most cases the windows lack pediments. The style often uses corbelled projecting turrets, sometimes called tourelles, bartizans or pepperpot turrets. The corbels supporting the turret typically are roll-moulded. Their roofs were conical. Gables are often crow-stepped. Round towers supporting square garret chambers corbelled out over the cylinder of their main bodies, are a particular feature of the Scottish baronial style. They can be seen at Claypotts, Monea, Colliston, Thirlestane, Auchans, Balvenie, and Fiddes.

Such castles or tower houses are typically built on asymmetric plans. Often it is a Z-plan, as at Claypotts Castle (1569–1588), or on an L-plan, as at Colliston. Roof lines are uneven and irregular.

Even in Scotland, the Scottish baronial style coexisted with Northern Renaissance architecture, which was preferred by wealthier clients. William Wallace's work at the North Range of Linlithgow Palace (1618–1622) and at Heriot's Hospital (1628–1633) are examples of a contemporaneous Scottish Renaissance architecture. Wallace worked for the Countess of Home at Moray House on Edinburgh's Canongate, an Anglo-Scottish client who employed the English master mason Nicholas Stone at her London house in Aldersgate.

The baronial style, as well as the Scottish Renaissance style, finally gave way to the grander English forms associated with Inigo Jones in the later part of the seventeenth century.

== Scottish Baronial Revival ==
European architecture of the 19th century was dominated by revivals of various historic styles. This current took off in the middle of the 18th century with the Gothic Revival in Britain. The Gothic Revival in architecture has been seen as an expression of romanticism and according to Alvin Jackson, the Scots baronial style was "a Caledonian reading of the gothic". Some of the earliest evidence of a revival in Gothic architecture is from Scotland. Inveraray Castle, built starting from 1746 with design input from William Adam, incorporates turrets. These were largely conventional Palladian style houses that incorporated some external features of the Scots baronial style. William Adam's son's, Robert and James continued their father's approach, with houses such as Mellerstain and Wedderburn in Berwickshire and Seton House in East Lothian, but most clearly at Culzean Castle, Ayrshire, remodelled by Robert from 1777.

Large windows of plate glass are not uncommon. Bay windows often have their individual roofs adorned by pinnacles and crenulations. Porches, porticos and porte-cocheres, are often given the castle treatment. An imitation portcullis on the larger houses would occasionally be suspended above a front door, flanked by heraldic beasts and other medieval architectural motifs.

Important for the adoption of the style in the early nineteenth century was Abbotsford House, the residence of the novelist and poet Sir Walter Scott. Rebuilt for him from 1816, it became a model for the Scottish baronial Revival style. Common features borrowed from 16th- and 17th-century houses included battlemented gateways, crow-stepped gables, spiral stairs, pointed turrets and machicolations. Orchardton Castle near Auchencairn, Scotland is a superb example dating from the 1880s.

Important for the dissemination of the style was Robert Billings's (1813–1874) four-volume work Baronial and Ecclesiastical Antiquities of Scotland (1848–1852). It was applied to many relatively modest dwellings by architects such as William Burn (1789–1870), David Bryce (1803–76), Edward Blore (1787–1879), Edward Calvert (c. 1847–1914) and Robert Stodart Lorimer (1864–1929) and in urban contexts, including the building of Cockburn Street in Edinburgh (from the 1850s) as well as the National Wallace Monument at Stirling (1859–1869). Dall House (1855) and Helen's Tower (1848) have square-corbelled-on-round towers or turrets. The rebuilding of Balmoral Castle as a baronial palace and its adoption as a royal retreat from 1855 to 1858 by Queen Victoria confirmed the popularity of the style.

This architectural style was often employed for public buildings, such as Aberdeen Grammar School (about 1860). However, it was by no means confined to Scotland and is a fusion of the Gothic revival castle architecture first employed by Horace Walpole for Strawberry Hill and the ancient Scottish defensive tower houses. In the 19th century it became fashionable for private houses to be built with small turrets. Such buildings were dubbed "in Scottish baronial style". In fact the architecture often had little in common with tower houses, which retained their defensive functions and were deficient with respect to 19th-century ideas of comfort. The revival often adapted the style to the needs and technical abilities of a later time.

In Ireland, a young English architect of the York School of Architecture, George Fowler Jones, designed Castle Oliver, a 110-room mansion of about 29,000 sq ft (2,700 m^{2}), built in a pink sandstone similar to Belfast Castle. Castle Oliver had all the classic features of the style, including battlements, porte-cochère, crow-stepped gables, numerous turrets, arrow slits, spiral stone staircases, and conical roofs.

This form of architecture was popular in the dominions of the British Empire. In New Zealand it was advocated by the architect Robert Lawson, who designed frequently in this style, most notably at Larnach Castle in Dunedin. Other examples in New Zealand include works by Francis Petre. In Canada, Craigdarroch Castle, British Columbia, was built for Robert Dunsmuir, a Scottish coal baron, in 1890. In Toronto, E. J. Lennox designed Casa Loma in the Gothic Revival style for Sir Henry Pellatt, a prominent Canadian financier and industrialist. The mansion has battlements and towers, along with modern plumbing and other conveniences. Another Canadian example is the Banff Springs Hotel in the Banff National Park in Alberta, Canada. The style can also be seen outside the empire at Vorontsov Palace near the city of Yalta, Crimea.

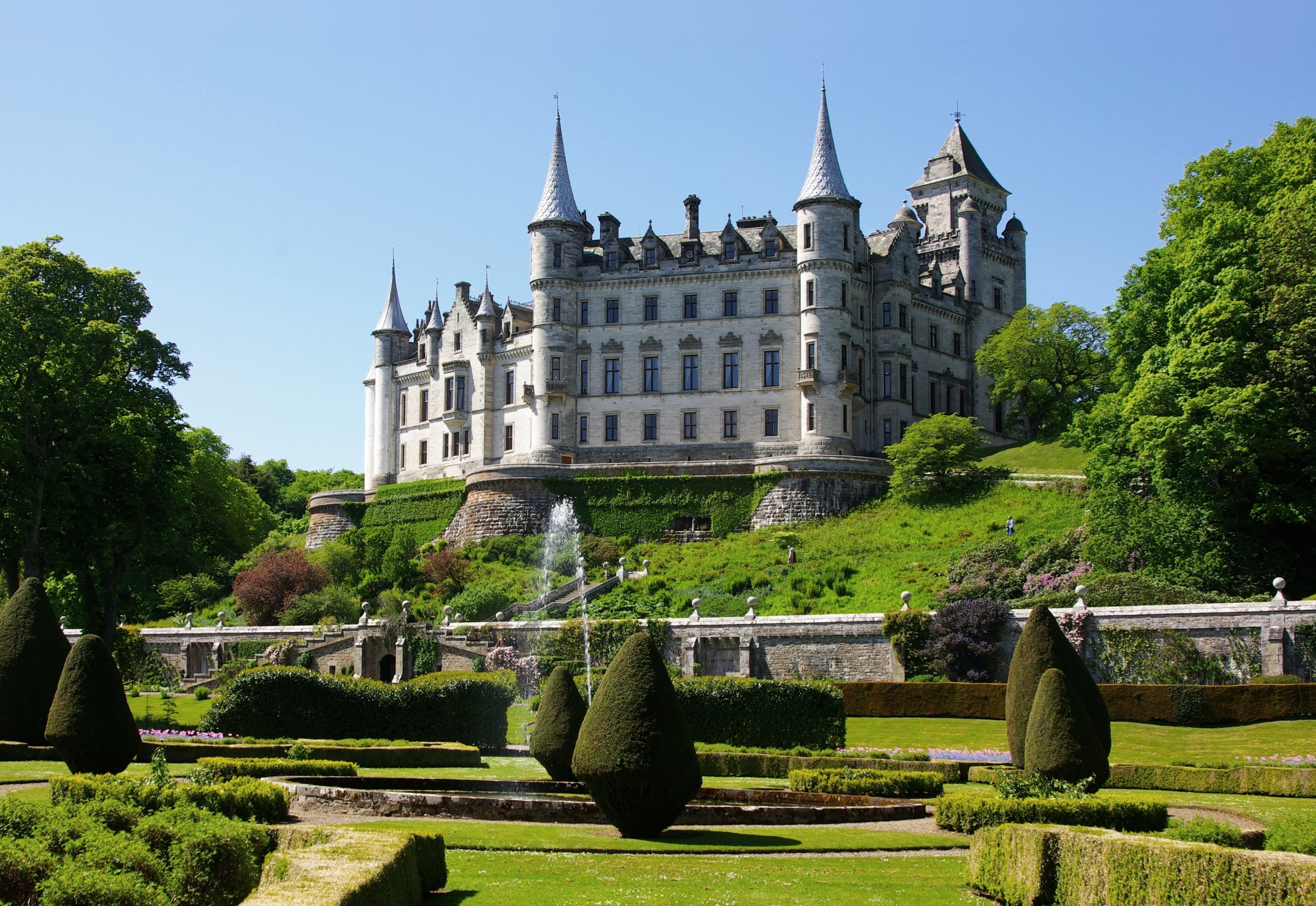
Dunrobin Castle is largely the work of Sir Charles Barry and similar to the ornate conical turrets, foundations and windows of contemporary restorations such as Josselin Castle in Brittany.

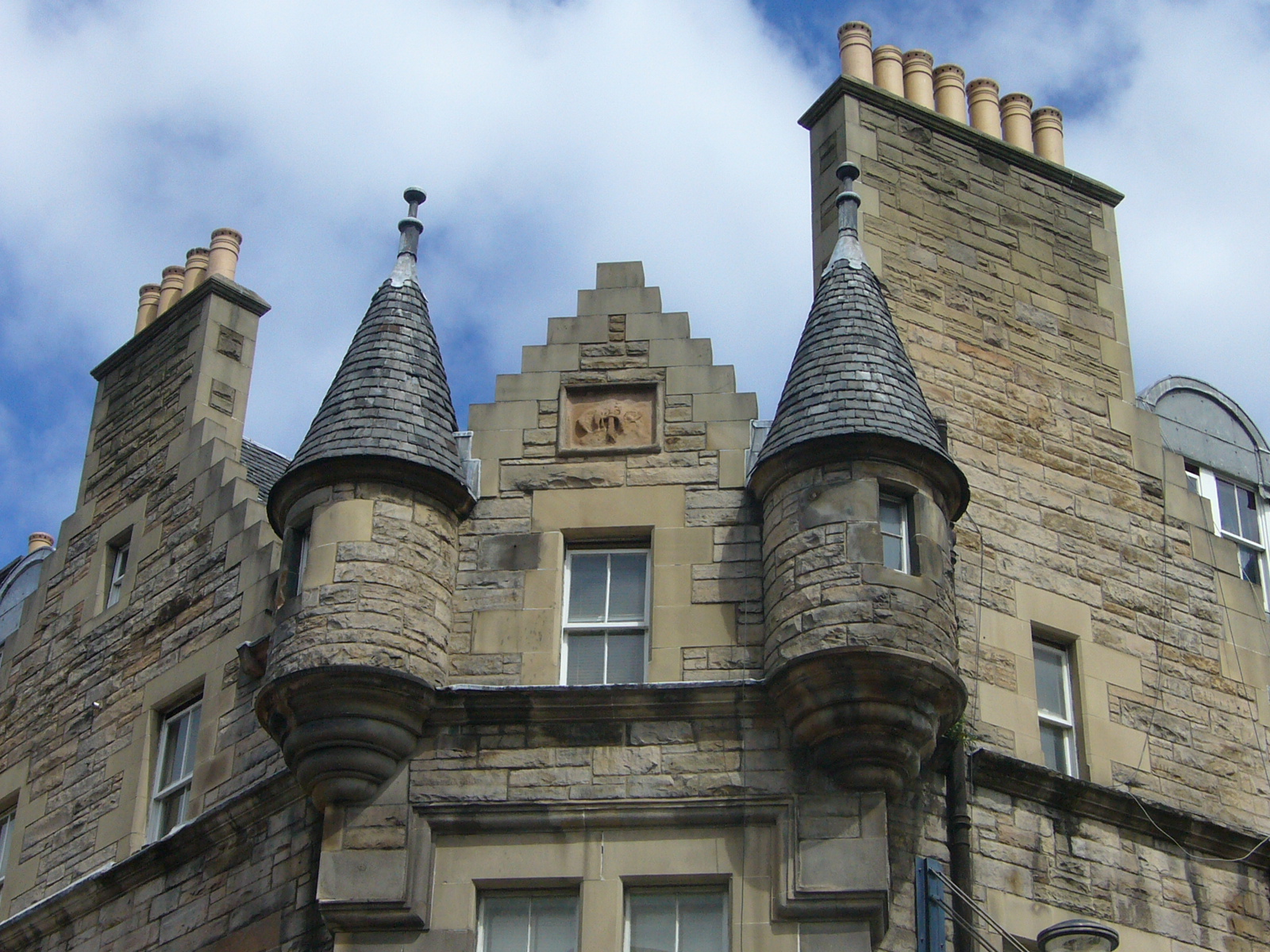
Scots-Baronial-style turrets on Victorian tenements in Edinburgh

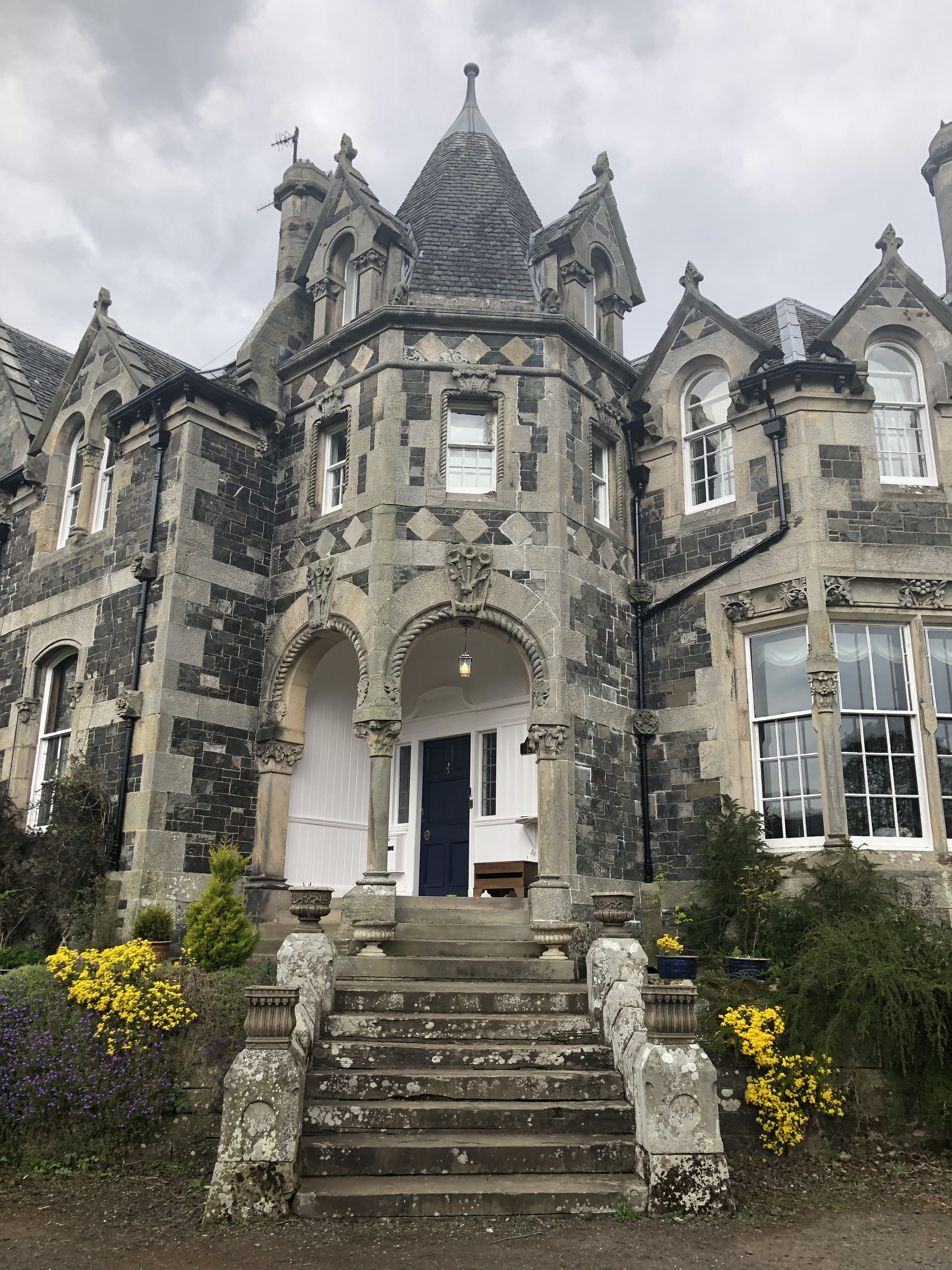
Scots baronial turret above entrance to The Kirna, an 1867 Ballantyne property in Walkerburn, Scottish Borders.

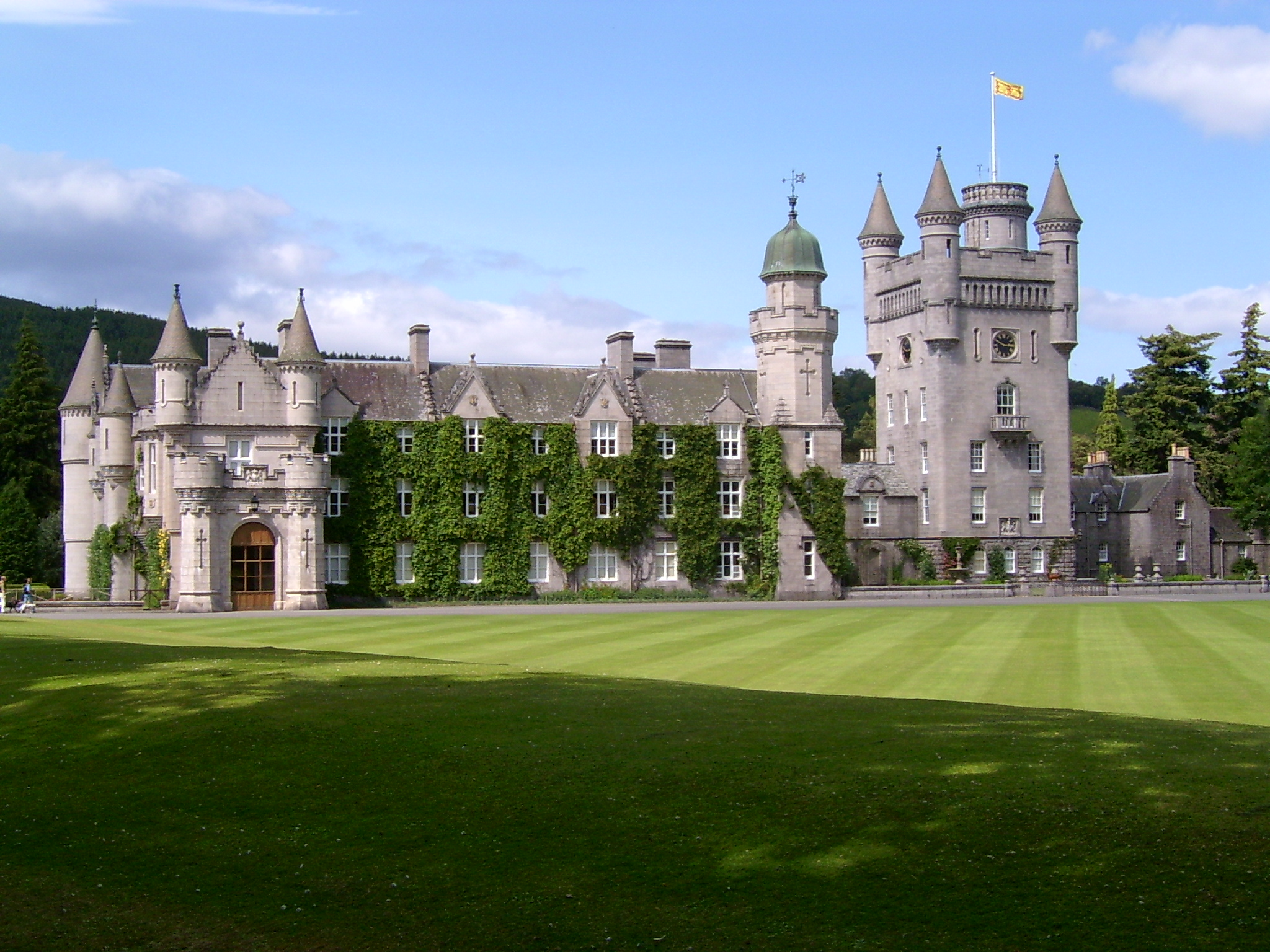
Balmoral Castle shows the final Victorian embodiment of the style. A principal keep reminiscent of Craigievar is the middle of the castle, while a large turreted country house is attached.

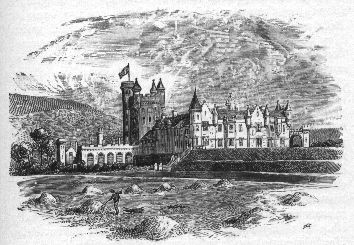
Balmoral Castle, Royal Deeside, Aberdeenshire.

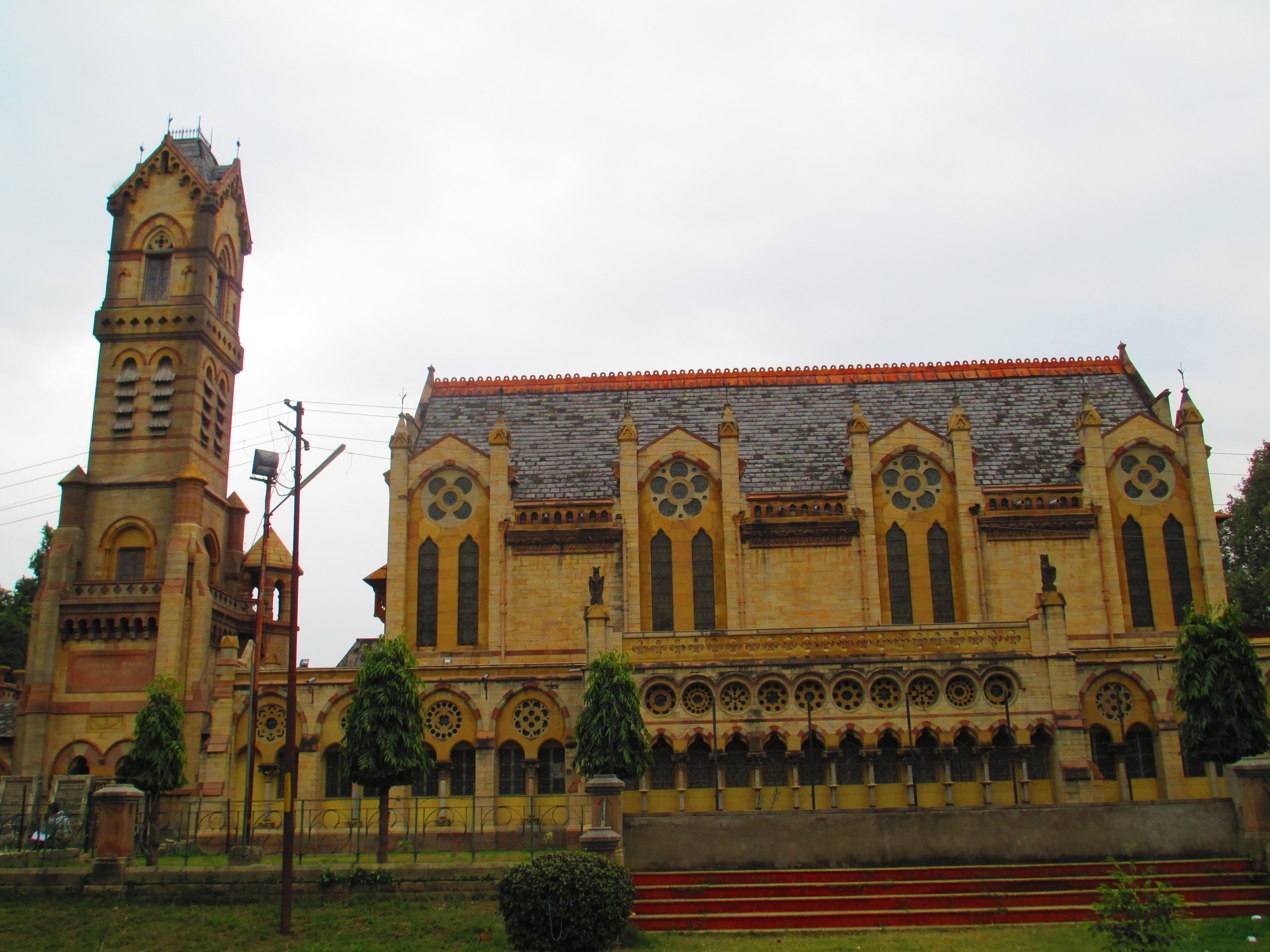
Allahabad Public Library, in Prayagraj, India

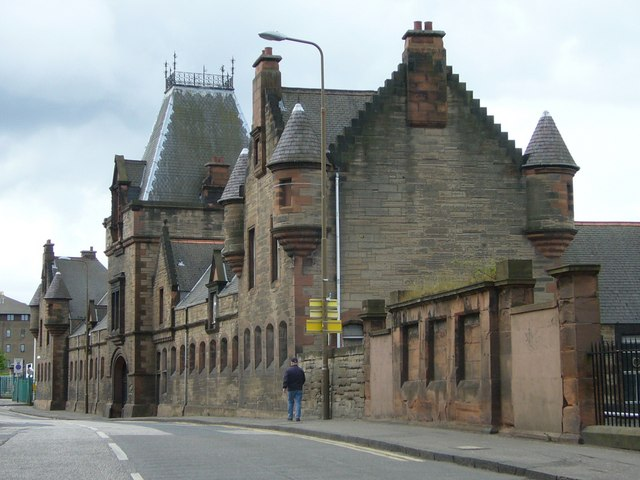
Powderhall Stables in Broughton, Edinburgh

== Decline ==
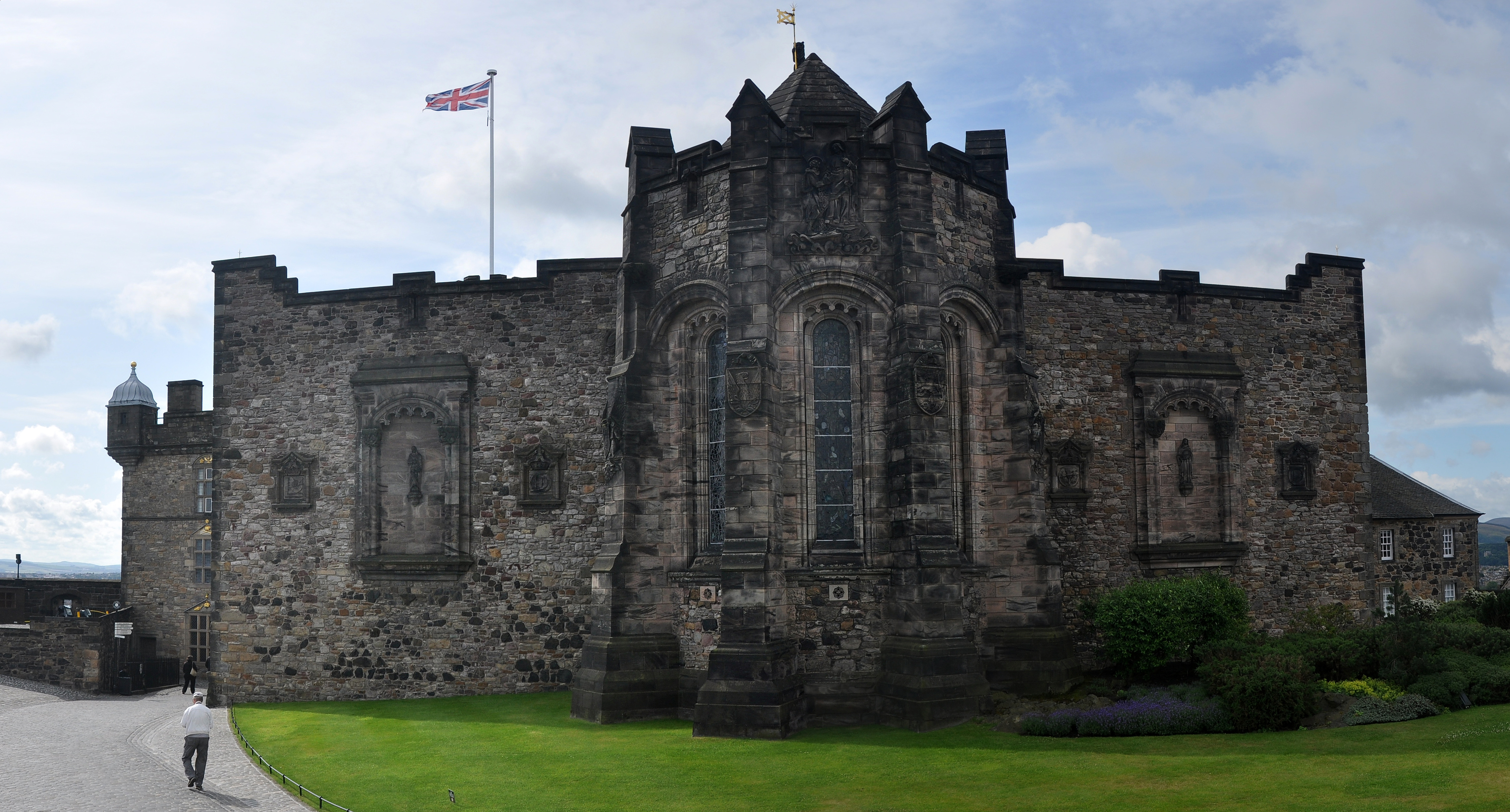
Rear of the Scottish National War Memorial (1920) in Edinburgh Castle

The popularity of the baronial style peaked towards the end of the nineteenth century, and the building of large houses declined in importance in the twentieth century. The baronial style continued to influence the construction of some estate houses, including Skibo Castle, which was rebuilt from 1899 to 1903 for industrialist Andrew Carnegie by Ross and Macbeth. Isolated examples included the houses designed by Basil Spence, Broughton Place (1936) and Gribloch (1937–1939), which combined modern and baronial elements.

The 20th-century Scottish baronial castles have the reputation of architectural follies. Among most patrons and architects the style became disfavoured along with the Gothic revival style during the early years of the 20th century.

== See Also ==
- List of Gothic Revival architecture
  - List of Gothic Revival architects
- Prospect 100 best modern Scottish buildings
