= Gallovidian =

Gallovidian can refer to:

- A person from Galloway
- The Gallovidian, a former Galloway magazine
- The Galwegian Gaelic language
