= John Herries McCulloch =

Scottish journalist and author

John Herries McCulloch (31 December 1892 - 27 November 1978) was a Scottish journalist and author. He attended Dumfries Academy and emigrated to Canada at age 17 to find employment. He worked at several labouring jobs before attending and graduating from the University of Toronto. After graduating, he worked as a journalist in Manitoba before becoming a columnist at the Toronto Star.

He returned to Scotland and joined The Scotsman. He edited The Gallovidian Annual following Dorothy Margaret Paulin and modernised its production.

In addition to his journalistic work, he was an authority on sheep dogs.

== Works ==
- Romantic Gretna Hall (1900)
- The Men of Kildonan: a romance of the Selkirk settlers (1926)
- The Splendid Renegade (1928)
- Dark Acres (1935)
- The Scot in England (193)
- Ten Day Trial (1936)
- The Edinburgh Savings Bank: a review of its century of service, with Kenneth James Stirling (1936)
- A Million Miles in Sail: being the story of the sea career of Captain C. C. Dixon (1937)
- Sheep Dogs and their Masters: being a history of the Border collie together with some notes about the men who have developed the breed (1938)
- Back Road to Glory (1944)
- Border Collie Studies (1952)
- Galloway: ancient and beautiful kingdom of the Solway Firth (1953)
- North Range: a record of hard living and adventure on the colourful northern rim of the British Empire (1954)
- Galloway Heather (1955)
- The Charm of Scotland (1960)
- Old Shetland: a tale of love and land-hunger (1969)
- Midget: the tale of a border collie (1976)
