= George Gordon Byron Sproat =

Scottish farmer and poet

George Gordon Byron Sproat (1858 - 23 or 24 January 1927) was a farmer and poet from Galloway. He contributed poetry to local publications including The Kirkcudbrightshire Advertiser and The Gallovidian under the pen name Venetia. He published a collection of poetry titled The Rose o' Dalma Linn and Other Lays of Galloway in 1888 which was illustrated by the artist John Faed. Three poems from the collection were anthologised in Harper's The Bards of Galloway, which also included his most famous work, the song Bonnie Gallowa. This song, according to Innes MacLeod, "has become something of a Galloway anthem." He is included in D. H. Edwards' (1883) Modern Scottish Poets.

Sproat was born at Nethertown of Almorness in the parish of Buittle, where his father was tenant. He held a tenancy at High Creoch, Gatehouse of Fleet before acquiring Boreland of Anwoth. On buying the estates of Borness and Borgue he became a substantial landowner as well as a farmer. Sproat was agricultural correspondent to the Dumfries Standard. He was an authority on Galloway cattle and wrote an article on the breed for the Encyclopaedia or Agriculture. He was involved in the formation of the Dun and Belted Galloway Cattle Breeders' Association. The well-known Knockbrex herd of Galloways was built up from his own herd.
