= Orchardton Castle =

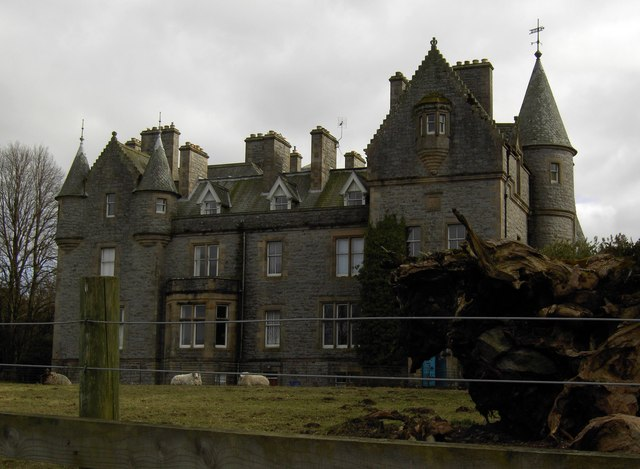
- Orchardton House (now Castle)
- Interactive map of the Orchardton Castle area
- Former names: Orchardton House

General information
- Architectural style: Scottish Baronial-style
- Location: Auchencairn, Scotland
- Coordinates: 54°51′33.2″N 3°51′15″W
- Construction started: 1878
- Completed: 1883
- Client: William Douglas Robinson-Douglas

Design and construction
- Architects: James Maitland Wardrop and Charles Reid
- Architecture firm: Wardrop & Reid, Edinburgh

Listed Building – Category B
- Designated: 23 April 1990
- Reference no.: LB17079

Orchardton Castle overlooks the Solway Coast. Built in the 1880s, this is a Grade B listed property formerly known as Orchardton House. Built around a Scottish Baronial-style mansion located in Auchencairn in the historical county of Kirkcudbrightshire in Dumfries and Galloway in Scotland. It overlooks the Solway Firth, with views to Cumbria and Hestan Island.

== History ==
The 1761 house had been started by Sir Robert Maxwell, 7th Baronet of Orchardton, who married a MacLellan of MacLellan's Castle and used the roof timbers and stone from nearby Orchardton Tower to build a new house in a better location near the sea. However the work bankrupted him and in 1786 the estate came under the ownership of James Douglas, a Liverpool merchant, and eventually passed down into the hands of William Douglas Robinson-Douglas in 1878.

The new owner had the small mansion removed and built the current structure in the Scottish Baronial style between 1878 and 1883.

In 1944 it became a military hospital for wounded officers and into a hotel after the war. The property was advertised for sale in 1951 when it was described as comprising 1,811 acres. and sold. It remained in use as an hotel until 1960. Between 1960 and 1981, it was a school and thereafter used for residential courses and conferences and housing for artists. Sold again in 2003 to Susanda DeVere, it was renovated over the next two years, including the installation of central heating and renewal of the electric wiring.

The owners fell prey to a con artist while trying to sell the property in 2012. He is still at large in Scotland and is regularly featured in the newspapers.

Its status was changed to castle in 2014, approved with Scottish heritage and government services.

In late 2017, DeVere offered the property for as the grand prize in a lottery with £5 tickets. However, not enough tickets were sold and a cash prize was offered to the winners as an alternative. A complaint from someone who had not entered the competition meant that the advertising authority found against the competition. The owner appealed and also refused to accept the verdict. The Gambling Commission and the vast entrants of the competition supported her and no case was ever brought.

== Description ==
A report in 2020 about the intended sale of the property, provided this information: "45-rooms, a cinema, library ... 20 bedrooms with more than 30 fireplaces spread out over four floors, and contains three full self-contained flats". There are also "three grand staircases, and one of them includes an original central lift".

The grounds comprise five acres with "botanic gardens and woodland, a large pond and paddock, a stable block [and] a private beach".

== Sources ==
- Paterson, George B L (1983). Orchardton House, Auchencairn, by Castle Douglas. University of Glasgow, Mackintosh School of Architecture: University of Glasgow.
