= Robert de Bruce Trotter =

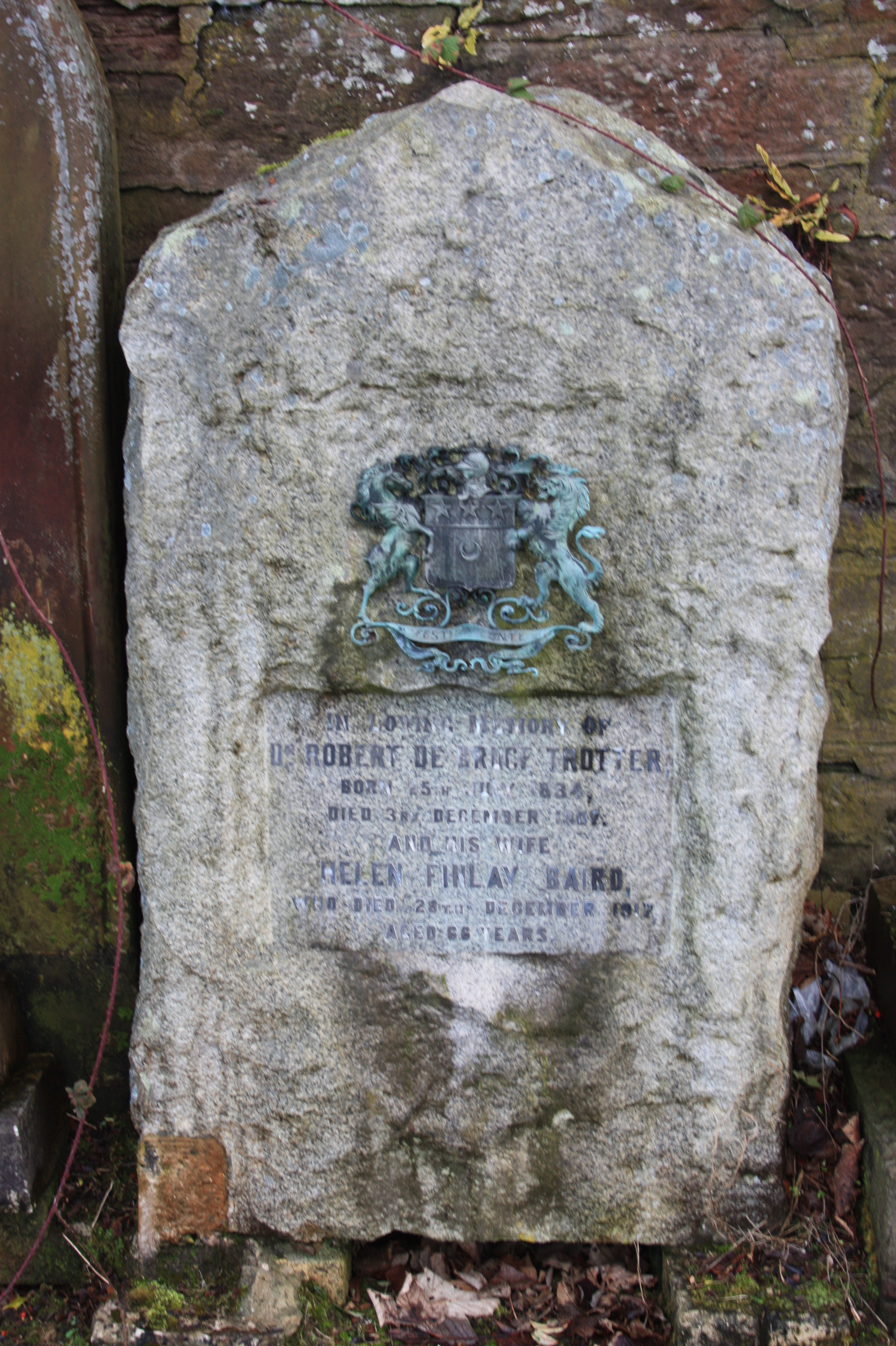
The grave of Robert de Bruce Trotter, Wellshill Cemetery, Perth (with incorrect dates)

Robert de Bruce Trotter (8 August 1833 – 3 December 1907) was a 19th-century Scottish physician remembered as an author and poet often writing under the pseudonym of Mrs Maria Trotter. Under the further pseudonym Saxon he "edited" his own texts. His books therefore appear as written by Mrs M Trotter and edited by Saxon. This presumably gave appeal and credibility to both male and female readers.

== Biography ==
Trotter was born in 1833 in Urr, Dalbeattie, Kirkcudbrightshire, into a distinguished family descended from Robert the Bruce. He was the eldest of five sons of Robert Trotter and Martha Maxwell Nithsdale. His father's sister, Isabella Trotter wrote a memoir about his grandfather. His four brothers, including Alexander Trotter, also became physicians. He and his brothers were the fifth generation of Trotter medical doctors. With only one exception — his great-great-grandfather was a reverend and academic – his paternal ancestors had been doctors going back more than 200 years. His ancestor Dr. Robert Trotter helped found the Royal College of Physicians of Edinburgh and served as president in 1689.

Soon after he was born, he family moved to Auchencairn, where he was educated. In 1846, he went to work in a law office in Glasgow. He left the law office to study Medicine at Glasgow University, graduating MB ChB around 1854. As a physician he practiced in Galloway, and began collecting local folktales and anecdotes. He was a regular contributor to newspapers and he published a book Galloway Gossip.

He travelled around the world while a young man and worked in British Guiana. He started a practice in Northumberland, which was taken over by his son when he returned to Scotland in 1880. He tool over his brother-in-law's practice in Perth and was popular in the community. He was one of the founders of the Perth Sick Poor Nursing Society and the S. Andrew's Ambulance Association. For several years he was a member of Perth Town Council and was influential in improving the city's sanitary and medical affairs.

Trotter was also an antiquarian and a member of the Edinburgh Society of Antiquaries. He also contributed to local papers on the subject.

He retired to Tayview House, 2 Tay Street in Perth, Scotland.

== Family ==
Trotter was married to Helen Finlay Baird (1851-1917). Three of his sons, Robert Samuel, Thomas Baird, and Alexander, became physicians. He died in 1907 in Perth and is buried in Wellshill Cemetery in the north of the city. The grave lies on the south wall of the southern path linking to the Jeanfield section.

== Principal works ==
- Galloway Gossip: Sixty Years Ago (1877)
- Galloway Gossip: The Southern Albanich Eighty Years Ago (1901)

In an attempt to reintroduce his work to a contemporary audience, selections from Galloway Gossip were included in the anthology The Sound of our Voices edited by Pete Fortune and Liz Niven, published by Dumfries and Galloway Libraries (2000). Further selections, and an essay on Trotter himself, by Pete Fortune, were published in the journal of the Scots Language Society, Lallans, in 2001.
