= List of Gothic Revival architects =

List of architects involved in the Gothic Revival.

- Truman O. Angell
- John Lee Archer
- James Piers St Aubyn
- Hubert Austin
- William Swinden Barber
- James Oscar Betelle
- Edmund Blacket
- George Frederick Bodley
- Giuseppe Bonavia
- Stephen Dykes Bower
- Arthur Bown
- Henry Edwin Bown
- David Bryce
- William Burges
- William Butterfield
- Richard Carpenter
- Richard Cromwell Carpenter
- Frederick Codd
- Sir Ninian Comper
- Cope & Stewardson
- Ralph Adams Cram
- Charles Amos Cummings
- Pierre Cuypers
- Alexander Jackson Davis
- Louis Delacenserie
- John Douglas
- Andrew Jackson Downing
- Benjamin Ferrey
- Watson Fothergill
- Thomas Fuller
- Frank Furness
- Emanuele Luigi Galizia
- Thomas Garner
- John Gibbs
- Bertram Goodhue
- Francis Goodwin
- Charles Francis Hansom
- Joseph Hansom
- James Harrison
- Otto Pius Hippius
- John Henry Hirst
- Edmund Kirby
- Charles Klauder
- Charles Donagh Maginnis
- Sanderson Miller
- Josef Mocker
- Benjamin Mountfort
- Samuel Joseph Nicholl
- John Notman
- Edward Graham Paley
- Henry Paley
- John Loughborough Pearson
- Frederick Thomas Pilkington
- William Pitt
- Demetri Porphyrios
- George Fellowes Prynne
- Augustus Pugin
- James Renwick Jr.
- Thomas Rickman
- James Gamble Rogers
- Thomas Rowe
- Robert Lewis Roumieu
- Anthony Salvin
- John Dando Sedding
- George Gilbert Scott
- Giles Gilbert Scott
- Edmund Sharpe
- Imre Steindl
- Josef Stenbäck
- George Edmund Street
- William Strickland
- Rev Frederick Thatcher
- Richard Upjohn
- Henry Hill Vale
- Henry Vaughan
- Eugène Viollet-le-Duc
- Friedrich von Schmidt
- William Wardell
- Alfred Waterhouse
- William White
- Frank Wills
- Benjamin Woodward
- Thomas Worthington
- William Wailes
