= Hestan Island =

Small tidal island in the Solway Firth, Southwest Scotland

Hestan Island Lighthouse
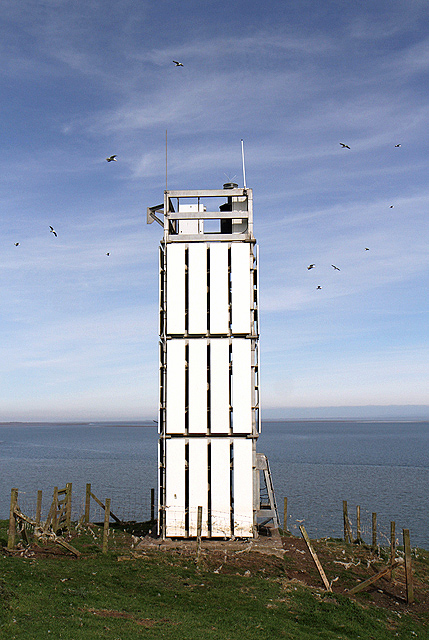
- Location: Hestan Island; Solway Firth; Scotland; United Kingdom
- OS grid: NX8395550177
- Coordinates: 54.832931°N 3.808020°W

Tower
- Constructed: 1850 (first); 1893 (second)
- Construction: skeletal tower
- Height: 23 metres (75 ft)
- Shape: unusual quadrangular tower covered by slatted daymark panels
- Markings: white tower
- Power source: solar power
- Operator: Northern Lighthouse Board

Light
- First lit: 1996 (current)
- Focal height: 42 metres (138 ft)
- Range: 9 nmi (17 km; 10 mi)
- Characteristic: Fl (2) W 10s.

Hestan Island is a small coastal island at the southern foot of the River Urr estuary in the Solway Firth, in the historical county of Kirkcudbrightshire, Scotland. This small island measures approximately 460 by 270 metres (1,510 by 890 feet) and at its highest elevation sits at just over 50 metres (160 feet) above sea level.

The isle of Hestan lies at the mouth of Auchencairn Bay in the region of Dumfries and Galloway in the former county of Kirkcudbrightshire. A lighthouse was built on the eastern side of the island by Alan Stevenson in 1850.

At certain conditions of low tide the island is accessible on foot as there is a natural causeway of shingle and mussels from Almorness Point to the northern tip of Hestan. The island can also be reached on foot from Rockcliffe during the time of spring tides, but requires wading (knee to thigh deep) across the lowest parts of the river Urr out on the mudflats. It is a two-mile walk and, unlike other parts of the Solway mudflats and, say, Morecambe Bay, you can walk faster than the incoming tide if you leave Hestan a bit late.

At the southern tip of the island is the notably-named "Daft Ann's Steps", a series of pinnacles where, legends say, a girl of lesser intelligence attempted to lay stepping stones ahead of her to reach the Balcary Point and drowned.

There are ruins of a manor house built for Edward Balliol near the north of the island.

In the 18th century the island was used as a centre of smuggling activity, with goods being stored in the caves on the south west of the island where there was reputed to have been shelves cut into the rock. Samuel Rutherford Crockett made great play with this in his novel The Raiders. Balcary House, on the opposite shore, now Balcary Bay Hotel, was used by a firm of smugglers which used its cellars to conceal their contraband.

The island is a popular destination for sea kayakers.

Hestan Island is one of 43 tidal islands that can be walked to from the mainland of Great Britain and one of 17 that can be walked to from the Scottish mainland.

== Gallery ==
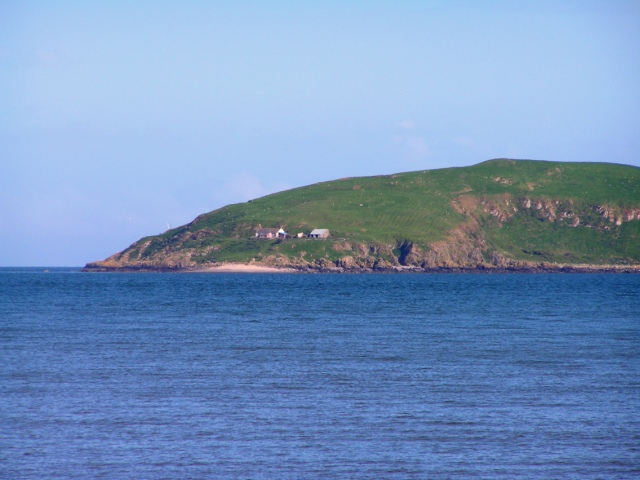
Buildings on Hestan Island

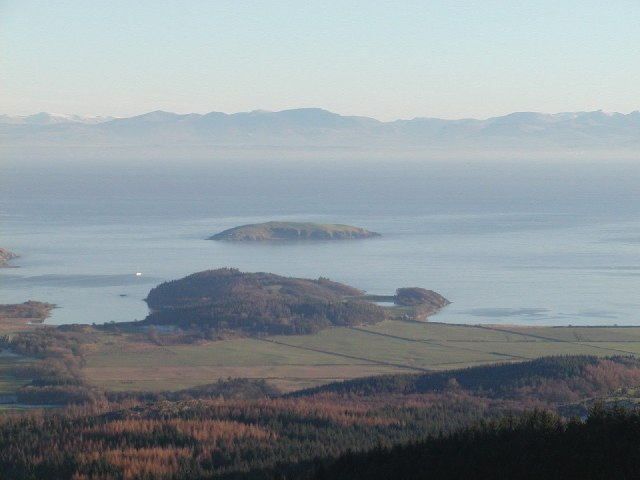
Hestan island in the Solway

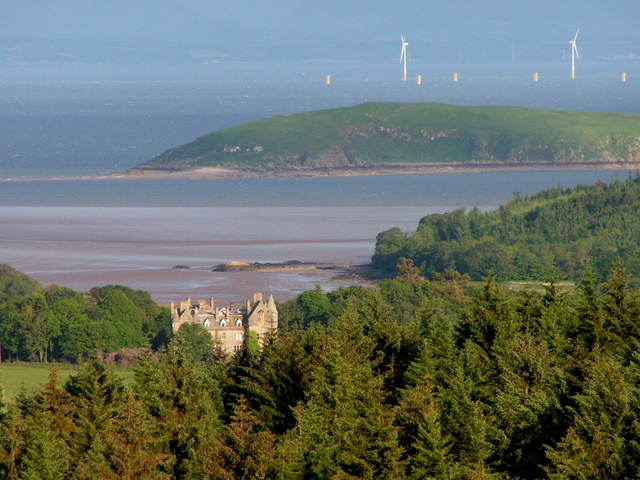
Orchardton Castle with Hestan and windfarm.

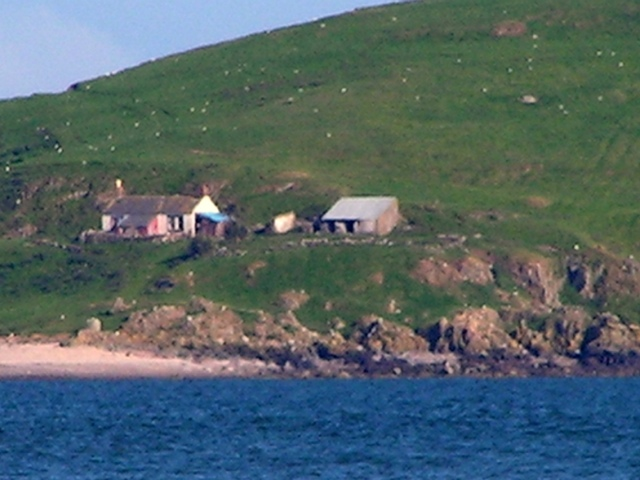

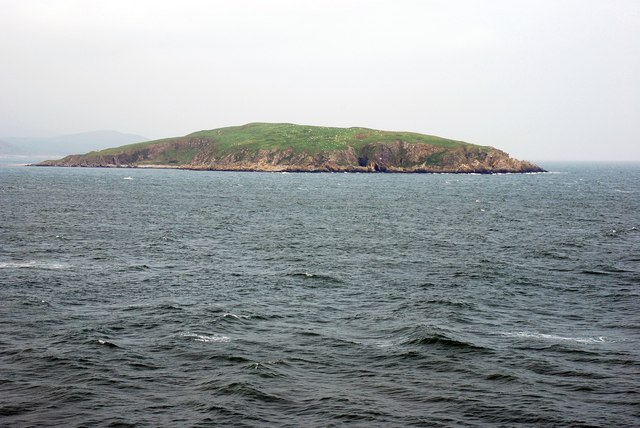

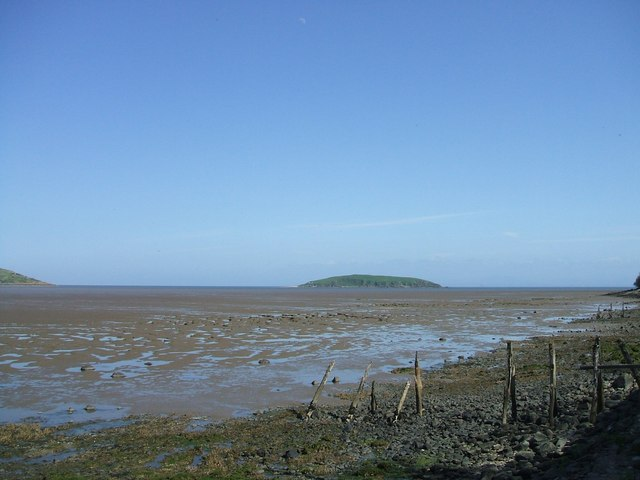

== See also ==
- List of islands of Scotland
- List of outlying islands of Scotland
- List of lighthouses in Scotland
- List of Northern Lighthouse Board lighthouses
