= Dorothy Margaret Paulin =

Poet and editor

Dorothy Margaret Paulin (née McBurnie; 3 February 1904 — 1982) was a Scottish poet and editor. She edited The Gallvoidian Annual from 1926-1936, the Soil Association Magazine and Scottish Home and Country.

== Works ==
=== Poetry collections ===
- Country Gold and other poems (1936)
- The Wan Water and other poems (1939)
- Solway Tide (1955)
- Springtime by Loch Ken and other poems (1962)
