= Auchencairn =

Coordinates: 54.8431°N 3.8726°W

Auchencairn: Scottish Gaelic: Achadh nan Càrn
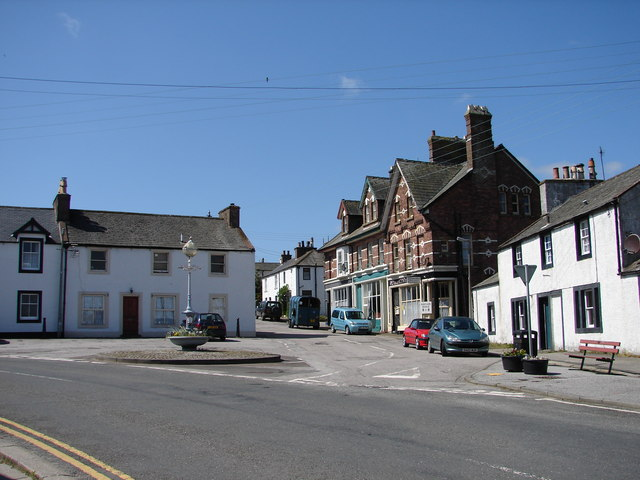

- Location within Dumfries and Galloway
- Civil parish: Rerrick
- Council area: Dumfries and Galloway
- Country: Scotland
- Sovereign state: United Kingdom
- Police: Scotland
- Fire: Scottish
- Ambulance: Scottish

Auchencairn, Scottish Gaelic: Achadh nan Càrn, (Scots pronunciation: [ˌɔxɪnˈkern]) is a village in the civil parish of Rerrick, and historical county of Kirkcudbrightshire, in the Dumfries and Galloway region of Scotland. It is located on the coast of the Solway Firth at the head of Auchencairn Bay and lies on the A711 road between the town of Dalbeattie to the east and Kirkcudbright to the west.

== History ==
Auchencairn has its origins as a small fishing and farming settlement, with records dating back to the 17th century. The village grew around Auchencairn Bay, which supported local herring fisheries well into the 19th century.

== Etymology ==
The name Auchencairn comes from the Scottish Gaelic Achadh nan Càrn which translates as 'the field of the cairn'.

== Services ==
Facilities available in Auchencairn include:

- The Smugglers Inn, a public house now permanently closed, dating from the 18th century and originally known as The Auchencairn Arms and has been reported as being haunted.
- A village store and post office, which was opened by the Princess Royal in March, 2008.
- Auchencairn Primary School, which has around 45 pupils.
- A mobile library. The mobile library service withdrawn by D&G Council September 2018.
- St. Oswald's Church, belonging to the Church of Scotland it was opened in 1855 as a chapel of ease.
- A bus service connects the village to Dalbeattie, Kirkcudbright and Castle Douglas
- An hotel and a number of bed and breakfasts and holiday cottages can be found in the local area.

== History ==
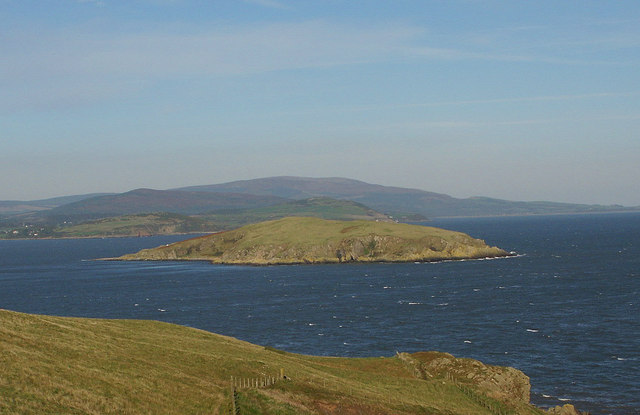
Hestan Island within Auchencairn Bay, the site of caves used by local smugglers to store goods.

There is evidence of human habitation of the area since the Mesolithic period, but the first written record of Auchencairn occurs from 1305 in a charter of Edward I of England in which 'Aghencarne' is listed among lands by longing to Dundrennan Abbey. In the early 17th century the village grew around the corn mill, and many of the older stone buildings in the village date from this time.

From 1750 onwards, Auchencairn Bay became the centre of extensive smuggling activity in the area, with many of the local inhabitants being involved. This history is reflected in the name of the village pub, the Smugglers Inn.

In July 1818 the poet John Keats stays briefly in the area, while touring South West Scotland, writing to his brother Tom: "the barefooted Girls look very much in keeping - I mean with the scenery about them." The novelist Elizabeth Gaskell spent a month here in 1859 living at Torr House overlooking the bay.

Robert de Bruce Trotter MB LRCPE LRCPSG (1833–1907) was a 19th-century Scottish physician remembered as an author and poet, principal works, Galloway Gossip:Sixty Years Ago (1877) and Galloway Gossip:The Southern Albanich Eighty Years Ago (1901).

The popular Wickerman Pop Festival was held here on land owned by local landowner Jamie Gilroy who died in 2014.

The end of each festival would end with the burning of a giant wicker man effigy. The festival took its name from cult film The Wicker Man starring Edward Woodward and Christopher Lee which was filmed on location in the area in 1972.

=== The "Rerrick poltergeist" ===
According to a pamphlet first published by local minister Alexander Telfair in 1696, a farm called The Ring-Croft of Stocking inhabited by the family of stonemason and farmer Andrew MacKie was the site of mysterious occurrences such as stones being thrown, cattle being moved, buildings set on fire, voices heard, family members beaten and dragged, and notes found written in blood. Telfair wrote that neighbours were hit by rocks and beaten by staves, and that he had seen and felt a ghostly arm which quickly vanished. In the pamphlet, Telfair described various things suspected "to have been the occasion of the Trouble", including MacKie supposedly taking an oath to devote his first child to the Devil, clothes left in the house by a "woman of ill repute", and failure to burn a tooth buried under the threshold stone by a previous tenant as advised by a 'witch wife', but declared the matter "still unknown." According to the story, after Telfair and several other clergymen said prayers at the farm, the trouble eventually subsided.

Telfair's pamphlet, entitled "A TRUE RELATION OF AN Apparition, Expressions and Actings, OF A SPIRIT, Which Infested the House of Andrew Mackie in Ring-Croft of Stocking, in the Paroch of Rerrick, in the Stewartry of Kirkcudbright, in Scotland. By Mr. Alexander Telfair, Minister of that Paroch: and Attested by many other Persons, who were also Eye and Ear-Witnesses", was published by an Edinburgh printer in 1696 and sold at the shop of George Mosman. Telfair's account ascribed the activity to a "violent noisy spirit", and in modern times the episode has been referred to as the "Ringcroft poltergeist", the "Rerrick (or Rerwick) poltergeist," or the "Mackie poltergeist".

The 4 October 1890 issue of the Saturday Review dismissed Telfair's story as folklore and "a curious mixture of obvious naked imposture", saying, "Five ministers, a few lairds, and a number of farmers signed this account, in which there is not a single suspicion breathed that the business was merely a practical joke. Mr. Telfair recites it as an argument against atheism, and for other reasons of edification."

Sacheverell Sitwell in his book Poltergeists (1940) wrote that events described in the story were created by one of Mackie's children using ventriloquism. Sitwell observes that a voice awoke MacKie, telling him he would "be troubled till Tuesday" and that if Scotland did not "repent" it would "trouble every family in the land". According to Sitwell, "Here, again there can be no doubt whatever that the actual Poltergeist was one of the children of the family. It had, in fact, learnt to ventriloquise. This, though, does not make the mystery any less unpleasant".

Academics, such as historians Lizanne Henderson and Ole Grell, wrote that Telfair's pamphlet was intended to communicate to a "less sophisticated audience" and counteract what was felt among clergymen of the period to be the dangerous influences of skepticism, atheism and deism. Henderson and Grell note Telfair's pamphlet's stated purpose to disprove "the prevailing Spirit of Atheism and Infidelity in our time, denying both in Opinion and Practice the Existence of Spirits, either of God or Devils; and consequently a Heaven and Hell..."

Ring-Croft of Stocking was situated on a rise to the north-west of Auchencairn, then part of the former parish of Rerrick. Traditionally, a wind-blown oak atop the ridge, last of the Auchencairn 'Ghost Trees,' marks the site of the MacKie farm today. The earliest Ordnance Survey map of the area, published in 1849, shows a structure some distance down from the crest of 'Stocking Hill’ marked as ‘The Ring (now in ruins).' Known also as the 'Ring End' or ‘Ringan,’ this was occupied as late as 1841 and may have marked the actual site of Andrew Mackie's house.

== Other locations ==
Auchencairn is the name of a hamlet, in the historical county of Dumfriesshire also in the Dumfries and Galloway region, that is located to the north of Dumfries and south of the village of Ae. It is also the name of a hamlet forming the north part of the village of Whiting Bay on the Isle of Arran.
