= The Gallovidian =

The Gallovidian was an illustrated magazine published in Dumfries, Scotland, between 1899 and 1949. The magazine published original poetry and prose and articles on history, folklore and local biography. The original series, subtitled An Illustrated Southern Counties Quarterly Magazine ran from 1899-1919. In 1920, The Gallovidian Annual was launched as a new and separate publication. However, as its run continued, The Gallovidian Annual began to be seen by the publisher and readers as a continuation of The Gallovidian, with little to no distinction made between the original quarterly magazine and the annual publication.

World War I and World War II interrupted publication. There were no editions of The Gallovidian published between Winter 1915 (vol XVII, no. 68) and Spring 1919 (vol XVIII, no 69). The Gallovidian Annual published its penultimate edition in 1940 and its final edition in 1949.

From 1899-1920 the publisher was J. Maxwell & Son, after which the magazine was published by Robert Dinwiddie, both of Dumfries.

One contributor was J G Carter (1856-1909) whose nom de plume was "Theodore Mayne". He was a great influence on the young Neil Gunn when the latter was living in St. John's Town of Dalry.

The paper is referenced in Dorothy Sayers' 1931 novel Five Red Herrings, which takes place in Galloway. In one episode Lord Peter Wimsey, after eating a good meal, is "dreaming over some old numbers of The Gallovidian".

== Editors ==
- J Maxwell Wood (1900-1911)
- J L Dinwiddie
- Kelso Kelly
- Dorothy Margaret Paulin
- John Herries McCulloch
- John Stuart Dinwiddie
