= Alexander Trotter (physician) =

Scottish physician, author, and community leader

- Born: 1835
- Died: May 25, 1901 (aged 66)
- Occupation(s): Physician, author
- Notable work: East Galloway Sketches

Alexander Trotter (1835 – 25 May 1901) was a Scottish physician, author, and community leader, best known for his work in medicine and his writings on the folklore and literary history of Galloway.

== Early life and family ==
Alexander Trotter was born in 1835, the son of Robert Trotter, a physician. He had two brothers, Robert de Bruce Trotter and James Trotter, who, like Alexander, were known for documenting Galloway history and folklore.

== Education and medical career ==
Trotter began studying medicine at the University of Glasgow at the age of 19, qualifying as a surgeon and physician in 1858. He later received an MD from the University of St Andrews in 1863.

During his training, he worked as a surgeon on a whaling ship and recorded the voyage in his 1856 journal, Journal of the Voyage of the Ship Enterprise, from Fraserburgh to Greenland.

== Work in Blyth ==
Trotter later established a medical practice in Blyth, Northumberland, where he was also a shipowner and newspaper proprietor. He played an active role in local government as one of the original members of the Blyth Town Council, a member of the Board of Guardians, and a representative of Cowpen on the Northumberland County Council.

== Literary contributions ==
In 1901, shortly before his death, Trotter published East Galloway Sketches: Or, Biographical, Historical, and Descriptive Notices of Kirkcudbrightshire, Chiefly in the Nineteenth Century. The work is a valuable record of Galloway's literary and cultural history, compiling and expanding upon a series of articles originally published in The Kirkcudbrightshire Advertiser.

== Death and legacy ==
Trotter died unexpectedly on 25 May 1901. He was remembered for his contributions both to medicine and to the preservation of local history in Galloway and Blyth.
